= Tytell =

Tytell is a surname. Notable people with the surname include:

- John Tytell (born 1939), American writer
- Martin Tytell (1913–2008), American typewriter expert
- Mellon Tytell (born 1945), American photographer
- Pearl Tytell (1917–2021), American criminologist
