= David S. Wills =

Scottish writer and editor

David S. Wills is a Scottish writer and editor who specializes in mid-twentieth century American literature. He is best known for his studies of William S. Burroughs and Hunter S. Thompson, as well as for editing the literary journal Beatdom.

== Personal life ==
Wills was born in Dundee, Scotland, where he earned his master's degree in American literature. He has spent much of his life in Asia and as of 2021, resided in Kampot, Cambodia.

== Career ==
Wills is the editor of Beatdom literary journal, which he founded in 2007. The journal focuses on the writings of the Beat Generation and includes essays, interviews, reviews, and poetry. Prominent interviewees include Patti Smith, Hank Williams III, Richie Ramone, Gary Snyder, Carolyn Cassady, Ken Babbs, and Bill Morgan.

Wills is the author of Scientologist! William S. Burroughs and the 'Weird Cult,' a study of the Beat author's decades-long relationship with the Church of Scientology. Journalist Tony Ortega called it “an engrossing read” and “a road map for future scholars.” Wills later wrote a book about Allen Ginsberg titled World Citizen: Allen Ginsberg as Traveller, which was named "Scottish Book of the Week" soon after its release.

In 2021, Wills published High White Notes: The Rise and Fall of Gonzo Journalism, a study of the work of Hunter S. Thompson. It was released on the 50th anniversary of the publication of Fear and Loathing in Las Vegas. Wills' book explores the creation of Gonzo journalism, dispels various myths about the author, and explains Thompson's descent into inconsistent and often incoherent writing. It has been praised for its "exhaustive and unequaled research."

Wills frequently contributes writings on the Beat Generation and other twentieth-century literature to Quillette, Lithub, Mental Floss, Evergreen Review, and other publications. He has worked with the U.S. Library of Congress and the Dutch government to celebrate the work of Allen Ginsberg. He has also worked with the Allen Ginsberg Estate to document the decades-long friendship between Ginsberg and Hunter S. Thompson. He wrote an essay on Ginsberg's time in China for the anthology Allen Ginsberg in Context, published by Cambridge University Press.

In addition to writing and editing, Wills works as a lecturer. In 2021, he gave the keynote address at the European Beat Studies Network conference, and in 2023, he lectured on Hunter S. Thompson in San Luis Obispo, California.

== Books ==
- Scientologist! William S. Burroughs and the 'Weird Cult' (2013)
- World Citizen: Allen Ginsberg as Traveller (2019)
- High White Notes: The Rise and Fall of Gonzo Journalism (2021)
- Murakamian Magical Realism and Psychological Trauma (2023)
- A Remarkable Collection of Angels: A History of the 6 Gallery Reading (2025)
