= Eugenia Smith =

Romanov impostor

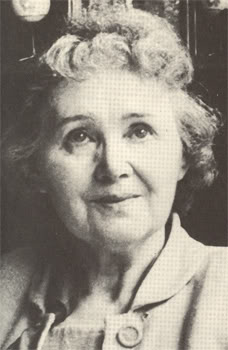
- Born: January 25, 1899; Bukovina, Austria-Hungary
- Died: January 31, 1997 (aged 98); North Kingstown, Rhode Island, U.S.
- Resting place: Holy Trinity Orthodox Monastery
- Other name: Eugenia Drabek Smetisko
- Known for: Romanov impostor who claimed to be Grand Duchess Anastasia
- Spouse(s): Marijan Smetisko (1918–19??; marriage dissolved)
- Children: 1 (died in infancy)

Eugenia Smith (January 25, 1899 – January 31, 1997), also known as Eugenia Drabek Smetisko, was one of several Romanov impostors who claimed to be the Grand Duchess Anastasia, youngest daughter of Nicholas II, the last Tsar of Imperial Russia, and his wife Tsarina Alexandra.

Smith is the author of Autobiography of HIH Anastasia Nicholaevna of Russia (1963), in which she recounts "her" life in the Russian Imperial Family up to the time when Bolsheviks murdered them at Ekaterinburg, and "she escaped" the massacre.

Although after World War II there were at least ten claimants to the identity of Grand Duchess Anastasia, only Anna Anderson and Eugenia Smith achieved more than a small circle of believers. The true Anastasia was killed along with her parents and siblings on July 17, 1918, but this was not known with absolute certainty until the missing body of one of the Romanov sisters was found and identified in 2007.

== Birth ==
According to naturalization papers she filled out when she emigrated to the United States, Eugenia Smith was born on January 25, 1899, in Bukovina, Austria-Hungary. However, as a claimant to the identity of Grand Duchess Anastasia, she would later assert that she was born on June 18, 1901, in St. Petersburg, Russia. Anastasia's date of birth is used on the grave labelled "Evgenia Smetisko" at Holy Trinity Monastery.

== Escape from Russia ==
In her published autobiography, Smith provided a lengthy but unverifiable explanation of how she survived the execution of the family of Tsar Nicholas II at Ekaterinburg on July 17, 1918, and subsequently escaped to the west.

By her own account, she regained consciousness in the cellar of the Ipatiev House after the execution, and was rescued by an unidentified woman who moved her to a dugout below a nearby house and then nursed her back to health. Smith began a trek to the west, accompanied by two men, one of whom was later identified to her as Alexander, a soldier who had been stationed at the Ipatiev House. The long journey, undertaken by train and on foot, took Smith and her rescuers through the towns of Ufa, Bugulma, Simbirsk and Kursk before reaching Serbia, where they were accommodated in the home of a local man and his wife. The party later travelled further, arriving at the home of an unidentified Slavic-speaking woman on October 24, 1918. Smith's published memoir ended at that point.

== Marriage ==
In later interviews, Smith claimed that she married Marijan Smetisko, a Croat, in October 1918; they subsequently had a daughter who died in infancy. She further claimed that her husband had given her permission to travel to the United States in 1922 and that the marriage was dissolved a few years later. In 1963, however, an American journalist tracked down Mr. Smetisko in Yugoslavia and reported: "The man was found living in a poor hut with his wife; he said he'd never known anybody named Eugenia, or anybody from Chicago, or had ever been married before. He wanted only to be left alone with his cows".

== Life in the United States ==
=== Arrival ===
A search of passenger manifests confirms that Eugenia Smetisko, aged 22, arrived in New York City on July 27, 1922, travelling from Amsterdam aboard the S. S. Nieuw Amsterdam. According to this source, she was a citizen of Yugoslavia, but spoke German and was of German ancestry. She was described as a married woman, with her husband listed as Mr. M. Smetisko of Sisak, Yugoslavia. She further identified her intended final destination as Hamtramck, Michigan. She later settled in Chicago, where she reportedly worked as a salesgirl and a milliner.

Smith evidently returned to Europe later that decade, as another passenger manifest reveals that Eugenia Smetisko, now aged 30, arrived in New York again on September 23, 1929, sailing from Le Havre aboard the S. S. De Grasse. This document further indicates that she had applied to become a naturalized citizen of the United States on April 4, 1928, in the Northern District of Illinois (Chicago). Her residential address was given as 6263 Greenwood Avenue, Chicago.

=== Supporters ===
During her early years in Illinois, Smith met John Adams Chapman, a prominent Chicago businessman, who accepted her claim to be the Tsar's daughter. Through Chapman's connections, Smith befriended two daughters of former federal judge Christian Cecil Kohlsaat, who also became her firm supporters. She would later describe the younger daughter, Mrs. Helen Kohlsaat Wells (1881–1959), as "a close friend and confidant for many, many years". The two women began to collaborate on Smith's memoirs in 1930, and completed a first draft four years later.

During this time, Smith was also a frequent guest of Mrs. Wells' older sister, Miss Edith Kohlstaat, who still lived in the vast house that her parents had built at Lake Geneva, Wisconsin, in the early 1900s. Smith moved there permanently in 1935 but, as Miss Kohlsaat later recalled: "she was difficult to live with, she found fault with all my friends, but she seemed so lost that I wanted to help her".

It was while staying with Edith Kolhsaat that Smith also met Mrs. Marjorie Wilder Emery, another friend of John Adams Chapman. Mrs. Emery (1882–1967) was the wealthy widow of William Harrison Emery, Jr. (1876–1938), son of William Harrison Emery, Sr. (1840-1903), and a former client of noted Prairie School architect Walter Burley Griffin. In 1945, Smith left Edith Kohlsaat's home in Lake Geneva and moved in with Mrs. Emery in Elmhurst. Smith's new hostess remained a firm believer in her claim to be the Tsar's daughter, and celebrated her birthday each year on Grand Duchess Anastasia's actual birthdate of June 18.

Smith remained with Mrs. Emery until 1963, except for two years spent with her daughter, Mrs. Norman Hanson, who lived across the street, and another year in New York when Mrs. Emery was in California. Mrs. Emery later echoed Edith Kohlstaat's comments that Smith was difficult to live with, recalling that she often seemed morose, objected to visits by some of Mrs. Emery's friends, did not get along with the servant, and became annoyed when she was not permitted to use the family car.

During the time that Smith lived with Mrs. Emery, her story caught the attention of a genuine Romanov relative, Prince Rostislav Alexandrovich Romanov (1902–1978), a nephew of Tsar Nicholas II and therefore first cousin to the real Anastasia. Prince Rostislav, who had lived in Chicago since the 1920s, was informed by his ex-wife, the former Princess Alexandra Pavlovna Galitzine (1905–2006), that Eugenia Smith was living in nearby Elmhurst. Keen to arrange a meeting, the princess invited Smith to lunch on no fewer than three occasions; in each case, however, the claimant declined on the grounds that she was too nervous.

In the late 1950s, Smith was introduced to writer and local historian Edward Arpee (1899–1979), author of such books as The History of Lake Forrest Academy (1944) and From Frigates to Flat-tops (1953), with whom she planned to collaborate on her memoirs. Arpee later recalled that he prepared a manuscript about the survival of Grand Duchess Anastasia "working from material supplied by Mrs. Smith in odds and ends, and in innumerable interviews". He later asserted: "She was difficult to get along with; I never received any thanks for my work during those years". Smith continued to review her manuscript with her long-time champion, Helen Kohlstaat Wells, until the latter's death in 1959.

=== Other activities ===
Whilst living at Lake Geneva, Smith (still using the name Eugenia Smetisko) gained prominence as a lecturer at various women's clubs in the Chicago area. In August 1940, she gave a talk to the North Shore Women's Club on the subject of the Balkans and Denmark.

In April 1943, at the invitation of the women's guild of St. Elizabeth's Church in Glencoe, she presented a lecture entitled "Russia Today and Yesterday". At that time, it was also reported that she had previously spoken at the Chicago Mount Holyoke Club. In 1944, Smith (described as "a Russian artist and traveller") spoke again on the topic of "Russia Before and Russia Now" before the Niles Center Women's Club.

During the time that she lived in Elmhurst with Mrs. Emery, Smith spent two years working in a silver shop on Michigan Avenue. She also attempted to start her own business as a perfume manufacturer, working from Mrs. Emery's home, but later became irritated when her hostess refused to invest in the project.

=== Publication of memoirs ===
Smith's public profile as a Romanov claimant was raised following her move to New York City in June 1963. She presented her manuscript to publishers Robert Speller & Sons, initially claiming that she was actually a friend of Grand Duchess Anastasia, who, before her death in 1918, had provided Smith with the notes on which the manuscript was based. Before proceeding any further, the Spellers contacted Gleb Botkin, son of the Tsar's physician and a childhood friend of the genuine Grand Duchess Anastasia. Botkin, who was a fervent supporter of rival Anastasia claimant Anna Anderson, was skeptical of Smith's claim.

Speller & Sons subsequently requested that Smith undergo a lie detector test. Under claims that she was Anastasia's close childhood friend, Smith failed the test, but after claiming that she actually was the late Princess, polygraph expert and former CIA agent Cleve Backster, concluded after nearly 30 hours of testing that he was "virtually positive that his subject was Anastasia". Gleb Botkin remained unconvinced; he later stated that "the lie detector must have had a screw loose somewhere", and warned Speller & Sons not to proceed with the project.

Nevertheless, the publishers went ahead. Smith's manuscript was re-written as the memoirs of Grand Duchess Anastasia herself, and was published towards the end of 1963 under the title Anastasia: The Autobiography of H.I.H. The Grand Duchess Anastasia Nicholaevna of Russia. Prior to publication, excerpts were printed by Life magazine, along with articles detailing the mixed results of the lie detector tests, handwriting analysis and an anthropologist's comparison of Smith's facial features with photographs of the actual Grand Duchess. There were also comments from two people who had known the Grand Duchess in childhood: Princess Nina Chavchavadze and Gleb Botkin's sister, Tatiana Melnik, both of whom rejected Smith's claims. Like her brother, Tatiana Melnik was convinced that rival claimant Anna Anderson was the genuine article. Anderson was aware of Smith's claims and discussed them with journalist Alexis Milukoff in a series of taped interviews conducted in Germany in the mid-1960s. Of the story, Anderson simply quipped: "Is it not incredible?".

In December 1963, Speller & Sons were contacted by Michael Goleniewski, a former Polish army officer who, for some years, had claimed to be Grand Duchess Anastasia's brother, the Tsarevich Alexei. A meeting was arranged between the two claimants, which took place at the publisher's New York offices on December 31, 1963. As recorded by Anna Anderson's biographer, the late James Blair Lovell, "the two imposters tearfully embraced and affirmed one another's authenticity". Although they later planned to collaborate on a memoir, the alleged siblings subsequently had a falling out. In 1965, Smith denounced Goleniewski as a fraud, although he reportedly remained convinced that she was his sister.

=== Later life and death ===
Michael Goloniewski later claimed that his "sister" had died in New York City in 1968, reputedly murdered after a visit of "very powerful men... two of them were Rockefellers". This, however, was not correct, as Smith was still alive and well at that time. She moved to Newport, Rhode Island, in the early 1970s, where she attended the local Congregational Church until her death.

During that time, she founded the St Nicholas House Foundation, a non-profit organization to establish a museum for Russian art and history in the United States. In her later years, Smith distanced herself from earlier claims of Imperial origins. In 1984, Associated Press reported that she had refused to discuss her claims with them. A decade later, when she was asked if she would like to provide a blood sample for DNA analysis, she also refused.

Smith painted into her 90s. Johannes Froebel-Parker published samples of her artwork in The Art of the Authoress of Anastasia: The Autobiography of H.I.H. The Grand Duchess Anastasia Nicholaevna of Russia (2014: Authorhouse); ISBN 978-14969-208-0-5.

== Death ==
Eugenia Smith died on January 31, 1997, at the Lafayette Nursing Home in North Kingstown, at the purported age of 95 years. Rev. Lark d'Helen, who conducted her memorial service at the Newport Congregational Church, said of her: "Eugenia was a woman of character determined, tenacious, imperial even to the end". Of her claim to be the grand Duchess Anastasia, another long-time friend stated: "She is an enigma ... that's not really important if she is or if she isn't. To me, she's just a human being. That's how everyone knew her".

Many newspapers published her obituary using Anastasia's birth date, or stated that she had been born in St. Petersburg. Unlike Anna Anderson, who was cremated upon death, Eugenia Smith was interred in the Orthodox fashion in the cemetery of Holy Trinity Orthodox Monastery in Jordanville, New York, as cremation is prohibited in that faith. She is buried in the back right side of the newer section of the cemetery under the name Evgenia Smetisko.

== See also ==
- Romanov impostors
