= Tatiana Botkina =

French writer

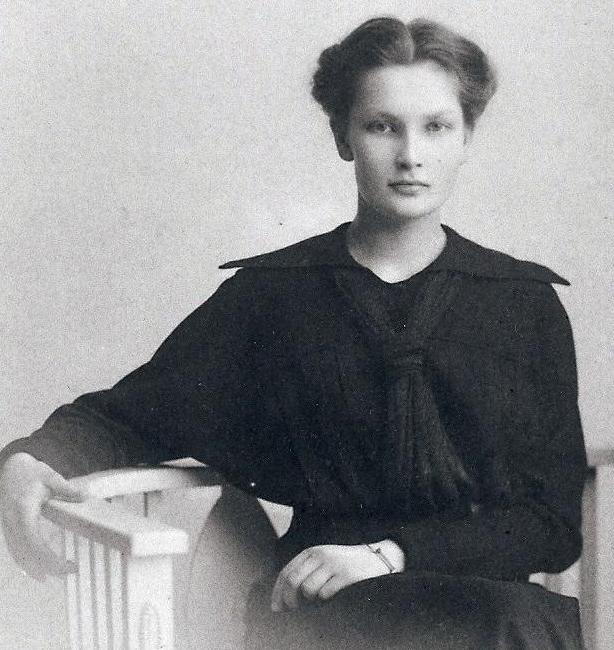
- Tatiana Botkina in Tobolsk, 1918
- Born: Tatiana Evgenievna Botkina; 9 September 1898; St. Petersburg, Saint Petersburg Governorate, Russian Empire
- Died: 1 April 1986 (aged 87); Fontenay-aux-Roses, France
- Burial place: Sainte-Geneviève-des-Bois Russian Cemetery
- Spouse: Konstantin Melnik (m. 1918, divorced)
- Children: 3, including Constantin Melnik
- Parents: Eugene Botkin (father); Olga Botkina (mother)
- Relatives: Sergey Botkin (grandfather); Gleb Botkin (brother)

Tatiana Evgenievna Botkina-Melnik (1898–1986) was the daughter of court physician Eugene Botkin, who was killed along with Tsar Nicholas II and his family by the Bolsheviks

In later years, Botkina, along with her brother Gleb Botkin, was a major supporter of Anna Anderson's claim that she was the surviving Grand Duchess Anastasia Nikolaevna of Russia.

== Early life ==
Botkina was the third child and only daughter of Botkin and his wife Olga. Her parents divorced in 1910 under the strain of Dr. Botkin's devotion to the royal family and the long hours he spent at court and her mother's affair with a German tutor. Eugene Botkin retained custody of the children following the divorce. Botkina's older brother Dmitri was killed in action during World War I.

The Botkin children "were not intimate friends" of the imperial children, Botkina later recalled, but they did know them fairly well. They first met the imperial children in 1911 and, thereafter, sometimes played with them when they were on vacation in the Crimea. Botkina also chatted on occasion with the younger grand duchesses during World War I, when Botkina served as a Red Cross nurse at a hospital in the Catherine Palace.

== Revolution ==
Botkina and her brother accompanied their father into exile with the Romanov family following the Russian Revolution of 1917. When the family was transferred from Tobolsk to Ekaterinburg, the Botkin children were not permitted to accompany their father. When Botkina asked Ural Soviet commander Nikolai Rodionov for permission to join her father at Ekaterinburg, he replied, "Why should such a handsome girl as you are want to rot all her life in prison, or even to be shot?" Botkina insisted that the imperial family would not rot in prison. Rodionov told her they would probably be shot instead. He told her he would allow them to accompany the group as far as the Ekaterinburg station, but they would be arrested and sent back to Tobolsk because he would not grant them an entry permit to live in Ekaterinburg. In the end, the Botkin children decided to remain behind in Tobolsk.

When Botkina heard the conclusion of the Sokolov Report, that the Tsar, his family and their servants had been killed, her sole consolation was that her father had died trying to shield the Tsar.

== Exile ==
In the fall of 1918, Botkina married Konstantin Melnik, an officer of the Ukrainian Rifles whom she had known at Tsarskoye Selo. They escaped from Russia through Vladivostok and eventually settled in Rives, France, in a town near Grenoble, where they raised their children.

Botkina divorced her husband some years later and settled near Paris, where she lived the rest of her life.

== Relationship with Anna Anderson ==
Botkina was first persuaded to visit Anna Anderson in 1926, after hearing about her story from her relative, Sergei Botkin. Botkina was persuaded that the woman was truly Grand Duchess Anastasia after hearing her describe an event that Botkina said only she and the youngest grand duchess could have known anything about. Anderson appeared to remember that Botkina's father, Dr. Eugene Botkin, had personally undressed Anastasia and performed a nurse's duties for her when the grand duchess was ill with measles in the spring of 1917. "Only once then, it happened that my father tended the Grand Duchesses alone and performed nurses' duties for them," Botkina recalled in 1929. "This fact has never been published anywhere, and apart from my father I alone knew anything about it."

She was a supporter of Anderson for the next sixty years and, like her brother Gleb, wrote her own memoirs about her friendship with the imperial family and her time in Russia.
