= Church of Aphrodite =

Church of a singular female goddess

- Gleb Botkin used this symbol of Aphrodite on the vestments for his Church of Aphrodite.
- Formation: 1938
- Type: Religious organization
- Purpose: structural Monotheistic Church, based on a singular female goddess, who is named after Aphrodite, the ancient Greek love goddess.
- Headquarters: Charlottesville, Virginia, US
- Location: United States

The Church of Aphrodite was a religious group founded in 1938 by Gleb Botkin, a Russian émigré to the United States. The organisation is considered one of the early precursors to the Goddess movement. Monotheistic in structure, the church believes in a singular female goddess, who is named after the ancient Greek goddess of love, Aphrodite.

Having grown up in the Russian Imperial court, Botkin fought in the Russian Civil War on the side of the counter-revolutionary forces after his father, a physician to the royal Romanov monarchy, was executed by the Bolshevik Party-led government. Fleeing to Long Island in the United States, he began writing novels and non-fiction books, mostly set in his Russian homeland, before coming to believe in a female divinity and founding the Church of Aphrodite. He won the right to register it as a religious charter in the New York State Supreme Court.

== Beliefs and practices ==
The only known printed source concerning the doctrine of the Church of Aphrodite is the treatise In Search of Reality written and published by Botkin in the 1960s. The treatise opens with the opinion that "prevalent religious beliefs and standards of morality . . . are based chiefly on . . . fantasies . . . of primitive people of an ancient past"; Botkin wished for adherents "to develop morally and intellectually" and "lead happier lives".

The central concept in Botkin's metaphysics is love, which he defines not as an emotion but as "energy" that engenders all being. The only "inexhaustible Generator of Love—its Prime Source and Ultimate Object—is the Supreme Deity and Creator." According to Botkin, the deity is the creator because it radiates love, which creates the cosmos. The process of this emanation is "an organic one", and therefore "the cosmos must be regarded as a fruit of the Divine Organism—not an arbitrarily created artifact." This is why the deity should be visualized "not as a Father God, but the Mother Goddess", since "it is only the feminine organism which is capable of bearing fruit". Since Botkin considered love an eternal flow, he based his hope for the immortality of human beings on the fact that they were consciously capable of love towards each other and the deity. "The Beyond" or "Paradise" is a place where evil—the antithesis of love and its concomitants beauty and harmony—is absent.

The relationship between the Goddess Aphrodite and the visible world may be illustrated by the relationship of a mother to her child. Having given birth to a child organically, a mother proceeds to take care of it with both her body and her mind. So, in her relation to the world, the Goddess is both the universal cause and the universal mind.

As it espouses a monotheistic form of religious syncretism, its beliefs were not consistent with the modern reconstructionist Hellenic religion of Hellenism but closer to those of Dianic Wicca. As Neopaganism scholar Chas S. Clifton noted, "Botkin's own writings anticipated by a generation the sort of Goddess religion found later in the pages of Green Egg and elsewhere," and which were propagated by Neopagan groups such as Dianic Wicca in the 1960s onward during by second-wave feminism.

== History ==
=== Gleb Botkin and the Church's founding ===
Gleb Botkin was born in 1900, the son of Eugene Botkin, who was the physician to the Romanovs, the Russian royal family of the time, and as such Gleb grew up in a wealthy background within the imperial household. Following the Russian Revolution of 1917, when the Bolshevik Party, a group of Marxists who wished to implement socialist reforms, took power, the monarchy was entirely abolished. The subsequent Russian Civil War broke out between those forces that supported the revolutionary government, the "Reds", and those that opposed them, the "Whites." The Bolsheviks subsequently ordered the execution of the Romanovs, fearing that the Whites would reinstate them, and so, in July 1918, the family, along with several of their closest aides, including Evgeny Botkin, were shot dead in the basement of the Ipatiev house in Ekaterinburg. His son, Gleb Botkin, retreated eastwards with the Whites, but following their defeat, fled via Japan to the United States.

Subsequently gaining employment as a commercial illustrator, Botkin began writing a series of books, both fiction and non-fiction, including an account of his memories of the Romanovs entitled The Real Romanovs, as Revealed by the Late Czar's Physician and His Son (1931). Many of his fictional stories also drew from his experience and involvement with the Russian aristocracy: Her Wanton Majesty (1934) was a fictionalised biography of Catherine I, the wife of Tsar Peter the Great, which portrayed her as a particularly lustful figure, whilst Immortal Woman (1933) dealt with the story of fictional Russian composer Nikolai Dirin, who after being persecuted by the Bolsheviks flees to the United States where he settles in Long Island, the very place that Botkin himself had settled into. Immortal Woman shows that Botkin was beginning to have ideas about a monotheistic goddess, for instance containing a quote in which the Russian Orthodox priest Father Aristarch states that "the Supreme Deity must be a woman" whilst at another point Dirin enters a church and began "to pray fervently to Aphrodite – his beautiful and kind Goddess whom the Christian Church decried as the White She-Devil, whose worshipers the heads of the Christian Church have repeatedly anathematized."

=== Later years ===
Botkin later moved the church to Charlottesville, Virginia. He self-published a book arguing that Aphrodite was the supreme deity and the creation of the world was like a woman giving birth. The church was one of the earliest of its kind in the neopaganism movement in the United States. Botkin's church is mentioned in Her Hidden Children: The Rise of Wicca and Paganism in America, by Chas S. Clifton.

== See also ==
- Feminist theology
- Thealogy
