= Pearl Tytell =

Forensic document examiner (1917–2021)

- Born: Pearl Lily Kessler; August 29, 1917
- Died: September 26, 2021 (aged 104); Bronx, NY
- Occupation: Forensic document examiner
- Years active: 70

Pearl L. Tytell (August 29, 1917 – September 26, 2021) was a forensic questioned document examiner and handwriting expert. With her husband, Martin Tytell, she was involved in the solving of numerous criminal cases for over half a century.

== Early life ==
Tytell was born on August 29, 1917, in Manhattan, and named Pearl Lily Kessler. She met Martin Tytell in 1938; they married in 1943. She graduated from New York University in the 1960s with a Bachelor of Science and a Master of Arts degree.

== Career ==
The Tytells had a typewriter rental and repair business in Manhattan from 1933 until 2001 which was devoted to creating keyboards in 142 languages. The husband and wife team were often asked to identify the specific typewriter used to type anonymous letters or to modify typed documents. In 1951 Pearl Tytell created the Tytell Questioned Document Laboratory which specialized in dating paper and ink as well as the forensic study of signatures on checks, contracts and wills to determine whether they were genuine. For fifty years she worked, testified and lectured on handwriting and typewriter identification as well as the detection of forgeries. She was a lecturer at New York University (1955-1957) and was a faculty member of the New York Institute of Criminology in 1958. She was one of the rare women working in a field dominated by men.

Pearl Tytell also handled the expert witness aspect of the business. She used examplars, enlarged photographs, mounted as exhibits, to illustrate the points needed to convince a jury in court. Among the cases for which her analysis and testimony were decisive were the 1972 Republican National Convention scandal uncovered by journalist Jack Anderson involving Dita Beard, a lobbyist for the International Telephone and Telegraph Corp. She debunked the claim by Eugenia Smith of Chicago, who asserted herself to be the Grand Duchess Anastasia Nikolaevna of Russia by analyzing aspects of her handwriting. She also was an expert witness for the Federal government in the tax-evasion case against the Reverend Sun Myung Moon. For that latter case she showed the modifications in Moon’s signature over time and conducted a scientific analysis of the watermarks on the paper of presented documents to prove that the Unification church documents had been deliberately reconstructed, redone and backdated, well before the date the paper had been distributed by Xerox, in a deliberate attempt to protect Reverend Sun Myung Moon from the IRS investigation.

== Personal life ==
The Tytells had a son, Peter Tytell, who followed in the family business and a daughter Pamela Tytell, who earned a Ph.D. from Columbia University. Pamela moved to France in 1976. She continues to work in Paris, France as a University Professor and writer of articles and books on psychoanalytic criticism, especially psychoanalysis applied to literary texts and to media. Martin Tytell died September 11, 2008, at the age of 94. Peter Tytell died August 11, 2020, two days before his 75th birthday. Pearl Tytell died September 26, 2021, at the age of 104 and 1 month.
