= John Tytell =

American writer and academic (born 1939)

- Born: 1939 (age 86–87); Antwerp, Belgium
- Education: PhD
- Alma mater: City College of New York; New York University
- Occupations: Academic, writer
- Employer: Queens College, City University of New York
- Spouse: Mellon Tytell

John Tytell (born 1939) is an American writer and academic. He is professor emeritus of modern American literature at Queens College, City University of New York.

Tytell's works on literary figures such as Jack Kerouac, Ezra Pound, Allen Ginsberg, Henry Miller, and William S. Burroughs have made him a leading scholar of the Beat Generation. He has written for the American Scholar, Partisan Review, New York Times, and Vanity Fair.

== Early life ==
Tytell was born in Antwerp, Belgium.

== Selected works ==
- (2017). Beat Transnationalism. Beatdom Books.
- (2014). Writing Beat and Other Occasions of Literary Mayhem. Nashville: Vanderbilt University Press.
- (2014). The Beat Interviews. Temple, PA: Beatdom Books.
- (1999). Paradise Outlaws: Remembering the Beats. New York: William Morrow. Photographs by Mellon Tytell.
- (1995). The Living Theatre: Art, Exile and Outrage. New York: Grove Press.
- (1991). Passionate Lives: D.H. Lawrence, F. Scott Fitzgerald, Henry Miller, Dylan Thomas, Sylvia Plath—In Love. New York: Carol Publishing Group.
- (1987). Ezra Pound: The Solitary Volcano. New York: Doubleday.
- (1976). Naked Angels: Lives and Literature of the Beat Generation. New York: McGraw Hill.
