= Beatdom =

Scottish literary magazine

Beatdom is a Scottish literary magazine. It was founded in 2007 and is published annually in May. The magazine features essays, reviews, and interviews concerning the Beat Generation, as well as short fiction and poetry. Wills refers to Beatdom as a “semi-academic” publication because it tackles subjects of academic interest in an accessible fashion.

== History ==
Beatdom was founded in May 2007 in Dundee, Scotland by David S. Wills. Wills has stated that the magazine was originally meant to focus on contemporary issues taking the Beat Generation as inspiration but that later it morphed into more of a conventional literary magazine.

Beatdom was originally a glossy, A4-sized magazine but with the ninth issue it switched to a 6x9 black-and-white format. Its focus also became slightly more academic. Since 2015, the magazine has drastically increased in size, with recent issues almost 300 pages long. During the COVID pandemic, digital editions were given away for free “so that anyone who wants to read this issue is able to, regardless of financial struggles.”

As of 2023, there have been twenty-three issues of Beatdom, each of which was edited by David S. Wills. Several of them were co-edited by other people involved in the magazine. Since 2011, the covers have been designed by American artist Waylon Bacon.

== Focus ==
Beatdom is dedicated to examining the history of the Beat Generation, but it also looks at Beat-affiliated and post-Beat writers. For example, several essays have been published about Charles Bukowski and there have been many about Hunter S. Thompson, neither of whom was part of the Beat Generation. Beatdom has also conducted interviews with musicians Patti Smith, Hank Williams III, Thurston Moore, and Richie Ramone, and has published poetry by the musician Scroobius Pip.

Prominent Beat writers and scholars interviewed by Beatdom include Michael McClure, Gary Snyder, Neeli Cherkovski, Bill Morgan, Carolyn Cassady, Barry Gifford, Ken Babbs, Paul Krassner, Ann Charters, Al Hinkle, Joyce Johnson, Amiri Baraka, Victor Bockris, and Gerald Nicosia.

In 2009, Beatdom published work by Alene Lee and an essay by her daughter. This is Lee's only published work. Beatdom has also published work by Joyce Johnson and Neal Cassady's daughter, Cathy Cassady.

== Publishing ==
In 2010, Beatdom expanded into a publishing company called Beatdom Books, which publishes books about the Beat Generation. These have examined, for example, the politics of Allen Ginsberg, the interests of William S. Burroughs, and the poetry of Diane di Prima. Like the magazine, Beatdom Books also publishes work on post-Beat writers such as Hunter S. Thompson. Authors who have been published by Beatdom Books include Bill Morgan, Bob Rosenthal, John Tytell, and Larry Beckett.

== See also ==
Beat Scene

Moody Street Irregulars

European Beat Studies Network

List of Literary Magazines
