= Gleb Botkin =

Author and Church of Aphrodite founder (1900–1969)

- Глеб Боткин
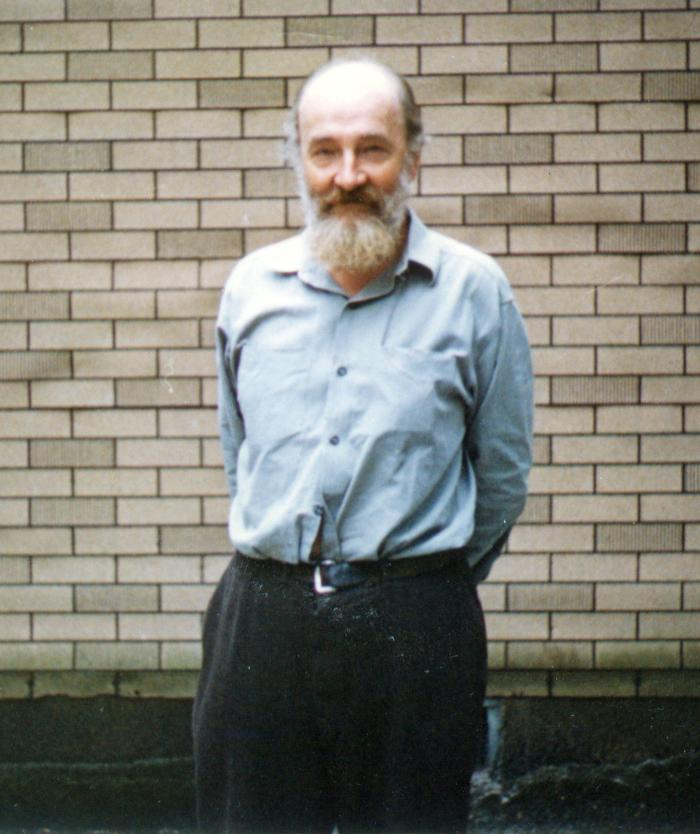
- Gleb Botkin c. 1960
- Born: Gleb Yevgenyevich Botkin; 29 July 1900; Grand Duchy of Finland, Russian Empire
- Died: 27 December 1969 (aged 69); Charlottesville, Virginia, U.S.
- Occupations: Author; illustrator; Church of Aphrodite founder and archbishop
- Spouse: Nadezhda Mandrazhi-Konshina
- Children: 4
- Parent(s): Yevgeny Botkin; Olga Vladimirovna Manuilova

Gleb Yevgenyevich Botkin (Russian: Глеб Евгеньевич Боткин; 29 July 1900 – 27 December 1969) was the son of Dr. Yevgeny Botkin, the Russian court physician who was murdered at Yekaterinburg by the Bolsheviks with Tsar Nicholas II and his family on 17 July 1918.

In later years, Botkin became a lifelong advocate of Anna Anderson, who claimed to be the surviving Grand Duchess Anastasia Nikolaevna of Russia. DNA results later proved that she was an impostor called Franziska Schanzkowska.

In 1938, he founded his own goddess-worshipping, monotheistic church, The Church of Aphrodite.

== Early life ==
Gleb was the youngest son of Russian physician Yevgeny Botkin and his wife, Olga Manuilova Botkina. Gleb was born on 30 July 1900 in Ollila, Hyrynsalmi Municipality, Kainuu, Finland (at the time a ducal province of Russia). His parents divorced in 1910, when Botkin was 10, due to his father's demanding position at court and his mother's affair with his German tutor, Friedrich Lichinger, whom she later married. Yevgeny Botkin retained custody of the children following the divorce. His older brother Dmitry was killed in action during World War I. According to Botkin's memoirs, he and his sister Tatiana Botkina (Tatiana Evgenievna Botkina Melnik) played with the children of Nicholas II during holidays. He used to amuse the grand duchesses on holidays and when they were all in exile at Tobolsk with his stories and caricatures of pigs dressed in human clothing acting like stuffy dignitaries at court. Exiled along with the Romanovs, Gleb and his sister hid in a basement after the royal family was executed along with the Botkins' father. After the then-secret execution of their father alongside the royal family, the young Botkins escaped and made their way to Japan. He took with him the illustrations and stories that he created in exile for the young Romanovs. The manuscript was donated to the Library of Congress in 1995 and published by Random House Value Publishing in 1996 as 'Lost Tales: Stories for the Tsar's Children'.

Botkin was described by one historian as "articulate, sensitive, with pallid skin and soulful green eyes" and as "a talented artist, a wicked satirist, and a born crusader". His obituary in the New York Times called him "a tenacious champion [of Anna Anderson's] fight for recognition as Anastasia" and a "devoted monarchist".

== Exile ==
Following the Russian Revolution of 1917 and the murder of his father, Botkin fled Tobolsk as a teenager. He later spent a summer at a Russian Orthodox monastery in Siberia and briefly considered becoming a priest, but decided against the religious life. He married Nadezhda Mandrazhi-Konshina, widow of Ensign of the Dragoons regiment, nobleman Mikhail Nikolaevich Mandrazhi, who was the chevalier of the Order of Saint George and was killed in battle in June 1915 at Grodno in Belarus. Two months after his death, Nadezhda (sometimes anglicised Nadine) gave birth to a daughter, Kira Mikhailovna Mandrazhi (1915–2009). Nadezhda's father, nobleman Alexei Vladimirovich Konshin, was the president of the Russian Bank of State from 1910 to 1914 and the president of the Russian Industry and Commerce Bank from 1914 to 1917. Ultimately, the Botkins had a daughter and three sons, as well.

The Botkins immigrated to the United States via Japan, arriving in San Francisco from Yokohama on 8 October 1922. Botkin worked as a photo engraver and attended art classes at the Pratt Institute in New York City. Later, he earned his living as a novelist and illustrator.

== Association with Anna Anderson ==
Botkin first visited Anna Anderson in May 1927 at Seeon Abbey, where Anderson was a guest. Anderson had asked Botkin to bring along "his funny animals". Botkin wrote later that he immediately recognized Anderson as Anastasia because she shared memories of their childhood play.

Historian Peter Kurth wrote that Botkin tended to overlook some of the more unattractive aspects of Anderson's personality, such as her stubbornness and rapid changes in mood, or to view them as manifestations of her royal heritage.

"She was, to Gleb's way of thinking, an almost magically noble tragic princess, and he saw it as his mission to restore her to her rightful position by any means necessary", wrote Kurth in Anastasia: The Riddle of Anna Anderson.

Botkin penned letters in support of Anderson to various Romanov family members, wrote books about her and the Romanovs, including The Woman Who Rose Again, The Real Romanovs, and Lost Tales: Stories for the Tsar's Children, and arranged for Anderson's financial support throughout his life. He was Anderson's friend even when other supporters abandoned her.

== Religious views ==
Botkin, following his father's murder, had considered becoming a priest, but he eventually turned away from the Russian Orthodox Church. Botkin eventually turned his interest in religion towards his own nature-based religion, which he started first in West Hempstead, New York and later in Charlottesville, Virginia. His church was called the Church of Aphrodite. Botkin was of the opinion that patriarchal society had caused many of the problems plaguing humankind. "Men!" he once said. "Just look at the mess we've made!"

His church drew from ancient pagan rituals and from some of the tenets of the Old Believers, a rebel branch of the Russian Orthodox Church who had separated after 1666–1667 from the hierarchy of the church as a protest against liturgical reforms introduced by Patriarch Nikon. Anderson never joined his church but did not object when Botkin finished his letters to her with this prayer: "May the Goddess bestow Her tender caress on Your Imperial Highness's head."

Botkin had argued his case before the New York State Supreme Court in 1938 and won the right to an official charter for the religion. The judge told him, "I guess it's better than worshipping Mary Baker Eddy." His wife, whom he doted on, converted to his church in later life.

Botkin held regular church services in front of a statue of Aphrodite, the ancient Greek goddess of love, and presided over them dressed in the regalia of an archbishop. The female symbol, a cross surmounted by a circle representing Aphrodite, was embroidered on his headdress. He later published a book, at his own expense, arguing that Aphrodite was the supreme deity and creation had been much like a woman giving birth to the universe. This symbol also was engraved on his gravestone at his death.

Botkin told a reporter for The Cavalier Daily, the student newspaper at the University of Virginia at Charlottesville, that his religion pre-dated Christianity. With Christianity, he said, "you have the dilemma of either following the straight and narrow path and going to Heaven or having fun on earth and going to Hell". On the other hand, he said that his "Aphrodisian religion" was based on "truth and reality. Anything true will survive. Life itself is the blossoming of love, and love is the basis of goodness and happiness". He thought his church would expand in coming years.

The student newspaper reporter commented on Botkin's "unorthodox" beliefs regarding sexual relations between men and women. Botkin believed that it was inappropriate for a man to react to his wife's affair with the rage that was expected by society: "A woman falls in love with another man. All that is necessary is to let her have her fling. After that she is often a better wife and mother. It is like a person who loves to play Bach and suddenly wants to play Beethoven." One historian commented that Botkin's church "was a curious faith, to be sure", but "the Church of Aphrodite was not nearly so wanton as it sounds".

The church did not continue long after Botkin's death from a heart attack in December 1969, but some of his followers went on to join neopagan movements with beliefs superficially similar to those of the Church of Aphrodite.

== Death ==
Rev. Gleb Botkin died at home from a heart attack in December 1969. He was buried alongside his wife Nadine in Monticello Memorial Park, Albemarle County, Virginia, on the outskirts of Charlottesville.

== DNA used to identify father's remains ==
Botkin and his wife had four children, daughter Marina and sons Nikita, Peter, and Yevgeny. He also had a stepdaughter, Kira, from Nadine's previous marriage. His daughter Marina Botkina Schweitzer's DNA was later used to help identify the remains of her grandfather, Yevgeny Botkin, after they were exhumed along with those of some of the Romanovs in 1991 from a mass grave discovered in Ganina Yama near Yekaterinburg. Schweitzer's DNA was compared against the DNA of her maternal half-sister Kira, who also gave a blood sample, to help scientists isolate the DNA Schweitzer shared in common with her grandfather. This enabled scientists to create a "Botkin DNA profile" and use it to positively identify Dr. Botkin. Scientists in the early 1990s were unable to identify Dr. Botkin using mitochondrial DNA, or DNA that is passed down from mother to child, as they used it to identify the Romanovs. Schweitzer was descended from Dr. Botkin in the paternal line and didn't share mitochondrial DNA with her father and grandfather.

Schweitzer later expressed skepticism about the DNA results proving that Anna Anderson could not have been the Grand Duchess Anastasia.
