= Sergey Botkin =

Russian clinician, therapist, and activist (1832–1889)

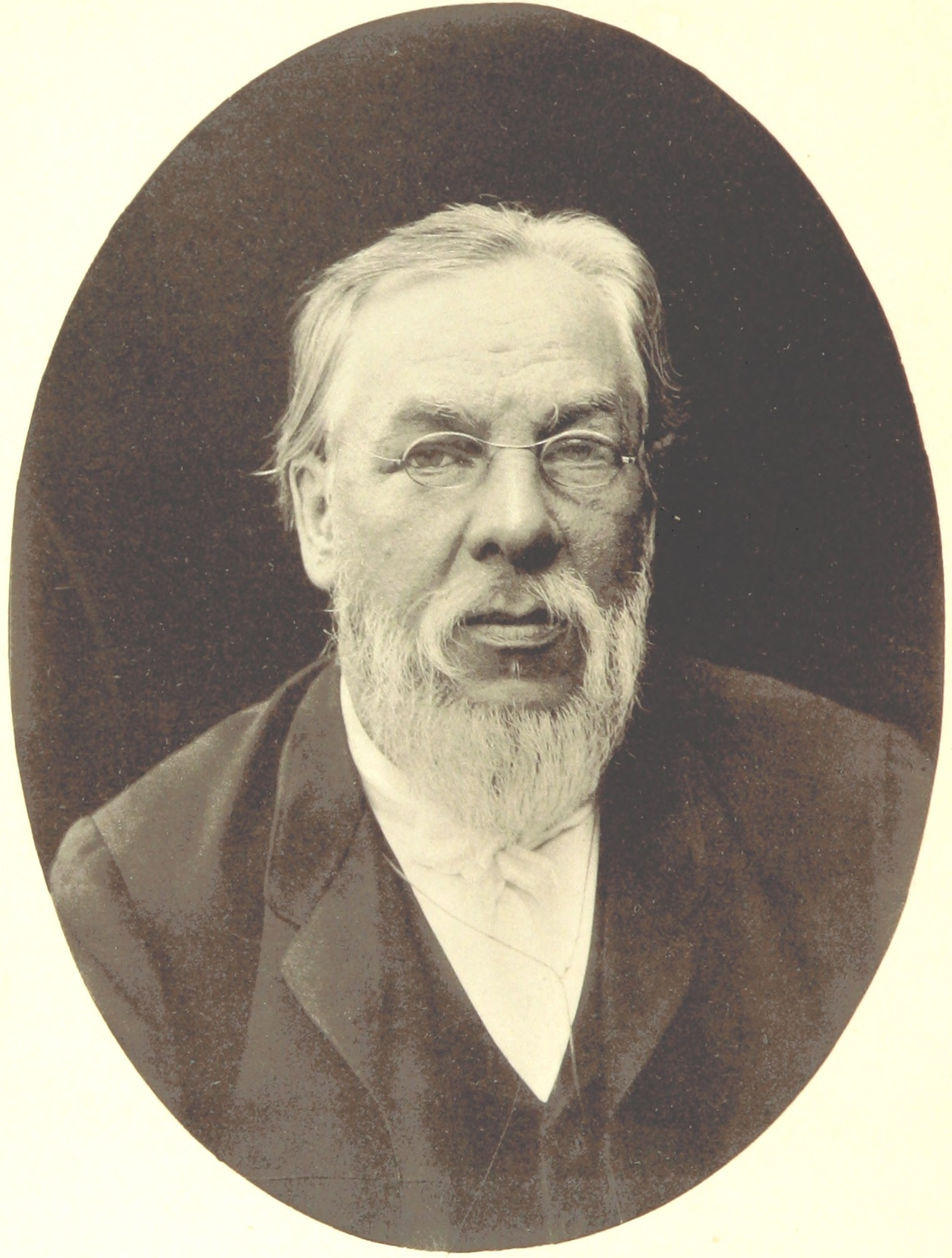
- Born: Sergey Petrovich Botkin; 17 September 1832; Moscow, Russian Empire
- Died: 12 December 1889 (aged 57); Menton, France
- Resting place: Novodevichy Cemetery, Saint Petersburg
- Education: Imperial Moscow University (1855)
- Known for: Triage; Pathological anatomy; Post-mortem

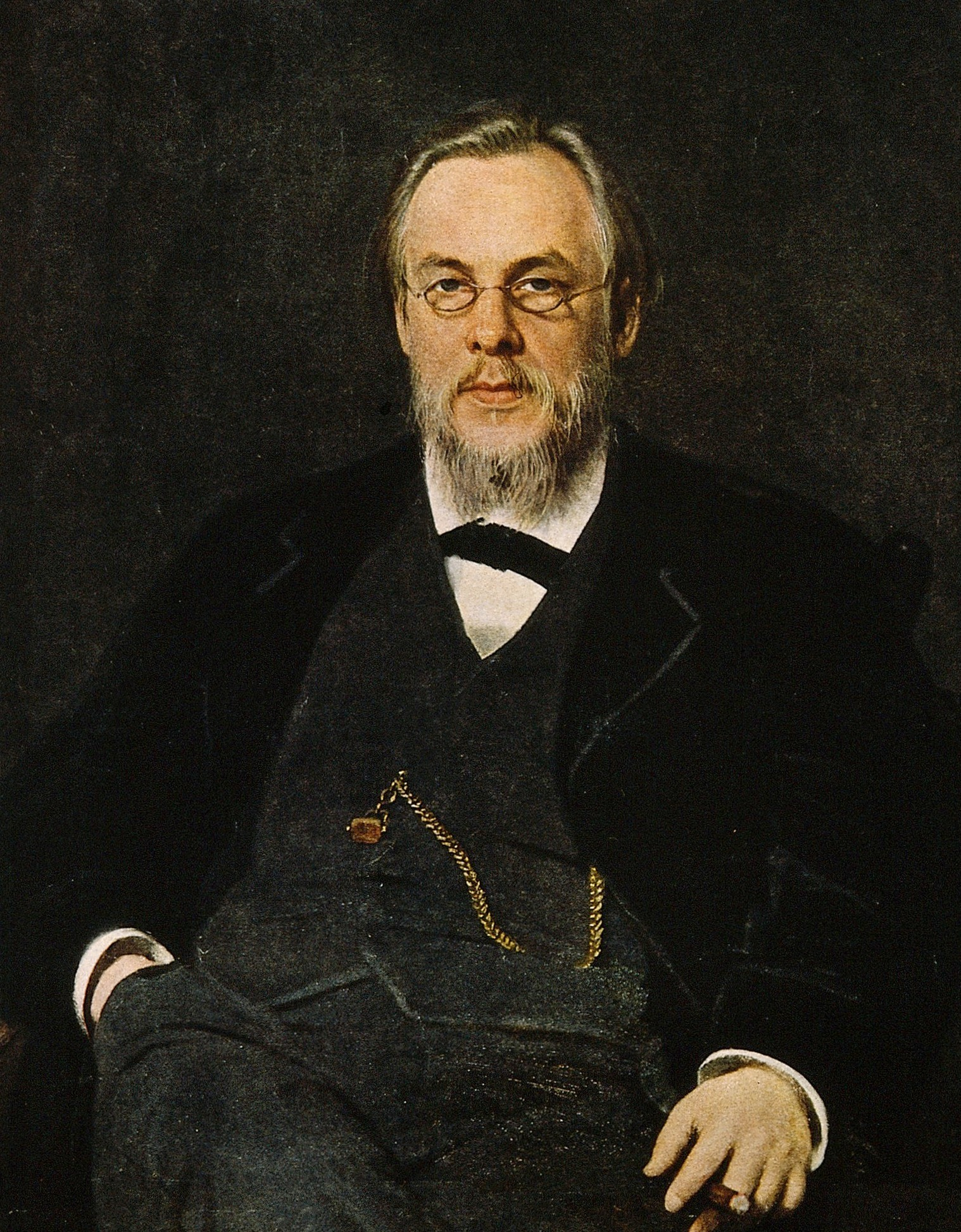
Sergey Botkin, by Ivan Kramskoi

Sergey Petrovich Botkin (Russian: Серге́й Петро́вич Бо́ткин; 5 September 1832 – 12 December 1889) was a Russian clinician, therapist, and activist, one of the founders of modern Russian medical science and education. He introduced triage, pathological anatomy, and post mortem diagnostics into Russian medical practice.

== Life and career ==
Botkin was born on 5 September 1832, in Moscow to a family of famous Russian tea tradesmen, and the son of Anna Ivanovna (Postnikova) and Petr Kononovich Botkin. He made his first steps towards education in the private school of Ennes. In 1850 Botkin was admitted to Moscow State University. In 1855 Sergey Botkin graduated from the university with honors and received a Doctor of Medicine degree. Shortly afterwards however he was mobilized as a conscript, designated to serve as military surgeon and sent straight to Sevastopol, where the Crimean War was in full swing. There Botkin worked under the guidance of Nikolay Pirogov, widely recognized as a pioneer of field surgery (i.e. the treatment of wounded combatants on the spot and in spite of ongoing hostilities as the situation may warrant). Pirogov is known for performing the first operation under anesthesia on the battlefield at the time. Upon the end of his military service, Botkin received a flattering review from his supervisor.

He subsequently went abroad, seeking to improve his skills and was able to gain valuable professional experience working at some of the most prestigious institutions on the continent. Upon his return to Russia, Botkin was invited to work with professor Shipulinsky in the Academy of Medicine and Surgery, and the following year Botkin took Shipulinsky’s position at the age of 29.

In 1860–1861, Sergey Botkin opened a clinical and research laboratory and in the course of his research organized systematic studies in clinical pharmacology and experimental therapy, both novelties in Russian research at the time. He was the first to suggest that catarrhal jaundice (hepatitis) was caused by an infection. In early 1860s, Botkin was assigned as an advising member of the medical board of the Imperial Ministry of Internal Affairs. In 1873 he was also made Head Surgeon to the Emperor, having been among the court physicians for Tsars Alexander II and Alexander III. Furthermore, the same year he was elected president of the Medical Association of St. Petersburg. In 1886, Botkin headed the National Public Health Commission, created to investigate the unusually high mortality rates prevalent in Russia, both in times of peace and war. Botkin Hospital is named after him.

== Family ==
Botkin was married to A.A. Krylova, relative of Alexey Krylov. His brother Vasily was a prominent writer and his brother Mikhail was a painter and well-known art collector. His son, Dr. Eugene Botkin, was murdered with Nicholas II and the Tsar's family on 16/17 July 1918 by the Bolsheviks.

Sergey Petrovich Botkin died on 12 December 1889, in Menton, France, from liver disease, which was complicated by a heart ailment.

== Bibliography ==
- Imperial Moscow University: 1755-1917: encyclopedic dictionary. Moscow: Russian political encyclopedia (ROSSPEN). 2010. pp. 91–93. ISBN 978-5-8243-1429-8 – via A. Andreev, D. Tsygankov.
- Beliaeva, V. S. (2007). "[Sergeĭ Petrovich Botkin—founder of physiological school in Russian medicine (to 175th anniversary of birthday)]". Экспериментальная и клиническая гастроэнтерология, Experimental & Clinical Gastroenterology (5): 152–154. PMID 18389612.
