= Mikhail Botkin =

Russian painter

- Михаил Петрович Боткин
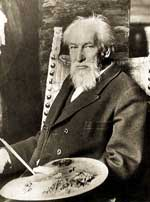
- Born: Mikhail Petrovich Botkin; 26 June 1839; Moscow, Russian Empire
- Died: 22 January 1914 (aged 74); Saint Petersburg, Russian Empire
- Resting place: Novodevichy Cemetery, Saint Petersburg
- Education: Imperial Academy of Arts (1858)

Mikhail Petrovich Botkin (Russian: Михаи́л Петро́вич Бо́ткин; 26 June 1839 – 22 January 1914) was a Russian painter, engraver, art collector, archaeologist and philanthropist. Vasily Botkin, the writer, and Sergey Botkin, the physician, were his brothers.

== Life and career ==
Botkin was born in Moscow, the son of Anna Ivanovna (née Postnikova) and Pyotr Kononovich Botkin, from a family of merchants who were engaged in the tea trade. His mother died when he was two and, when he was fourteen, his father died so his upbringing was completed by his older brother Vasily. In 1856, he entered the Imperial Academy of Fine Arts, where he studied under Fyodor Zavyalov and Fyodor Bruni. Two years later, he decided to travel, spending several years in Germany, France and Italy.

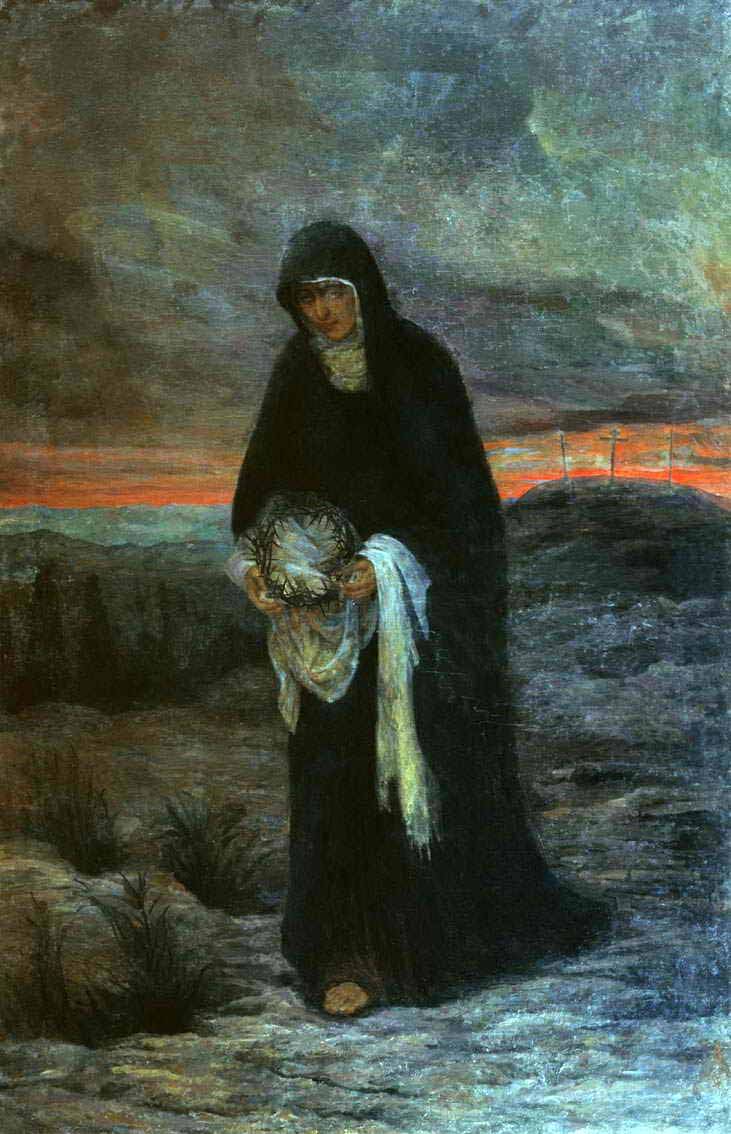
The Mourning Virgin

When he returned in 1863, he presented two paintings on Classical subjects at the academy and was awarded the title of Academician. He also received the Order of Saint Stanislaus, Third Degree (later First Degree). In 1870, he was presented with the Order of St. Anna, Third Degree (later First Degree) and the Order of the Crown (Prussia) for his work with the German Archaeological Institute in Rome.

In 1879, he became a member of the board at the academy and, in 1882, served on a committee of the Ministry of the Imperial Court devoted to restoring the Cathedral of the Annunciation. Shortly after, he was awarded the Order of St. Vladimir, Fourth Degree (later Second Degree). Six years later, he helped create the Russian pavilion at the Nordic Exhibition of 1888 and was named a Grand Commander in the Order of the Dannebrog.

In 1896, he became the Curator at the museum of the "Imperial Society for the Encouragement of the Arts" and was consulted as an expert on restoring the frescoes at the Cathedral of St. Sophia, Novgorod, and the Mirozhsky Monastery in Pskov. Two years later, he served on the committee that planned the renovation of Mikhailovsky Palace and, together with Nikolay Likhachyov, wrote the first catalogue for the ancient art collection at the Russian Museum.

In addition to his artistic activities, he served in administrative positions on the boards of a bank, Russia's first insurance company and a steamship line. He was also a member of the Saint Petersburg City Duma.

== His art collection ==
In 1882, he bought a mansion on Vasilievsky Island, where he housed his collection in five small rooms in the attic. On Sundays, it was open to the public, free of charge. The collection included a wide variety of objects, spanning several centuries, from many locations around the Mediterranean as well as Russia. During his many trips to Italy, he acquired rare paintings by Pinturicchio, Sandro Botticelli, Andrea Mantegna and many others.

In 1917, his widow deposited thirty-two sealed boxes of especially valuable artworks at the Russian Museum (presumably to protect them during World War I) with the provision that they would become the museum's property if she had not reclaimed them within a year of the war's end. She died later that same year. Accordingly, the museum took possession. After the Russian Revolution and Civil War, some of the artworks and books in the boxes were transferred to the Hermitage Museum. Over 200 pieces of gold cloisonné were sold by the Soviet government to collectors in Europe and the United States, supposedly from Botkin's collection, but their authenticity has been questioned by technical experts, based on chemical analysis.

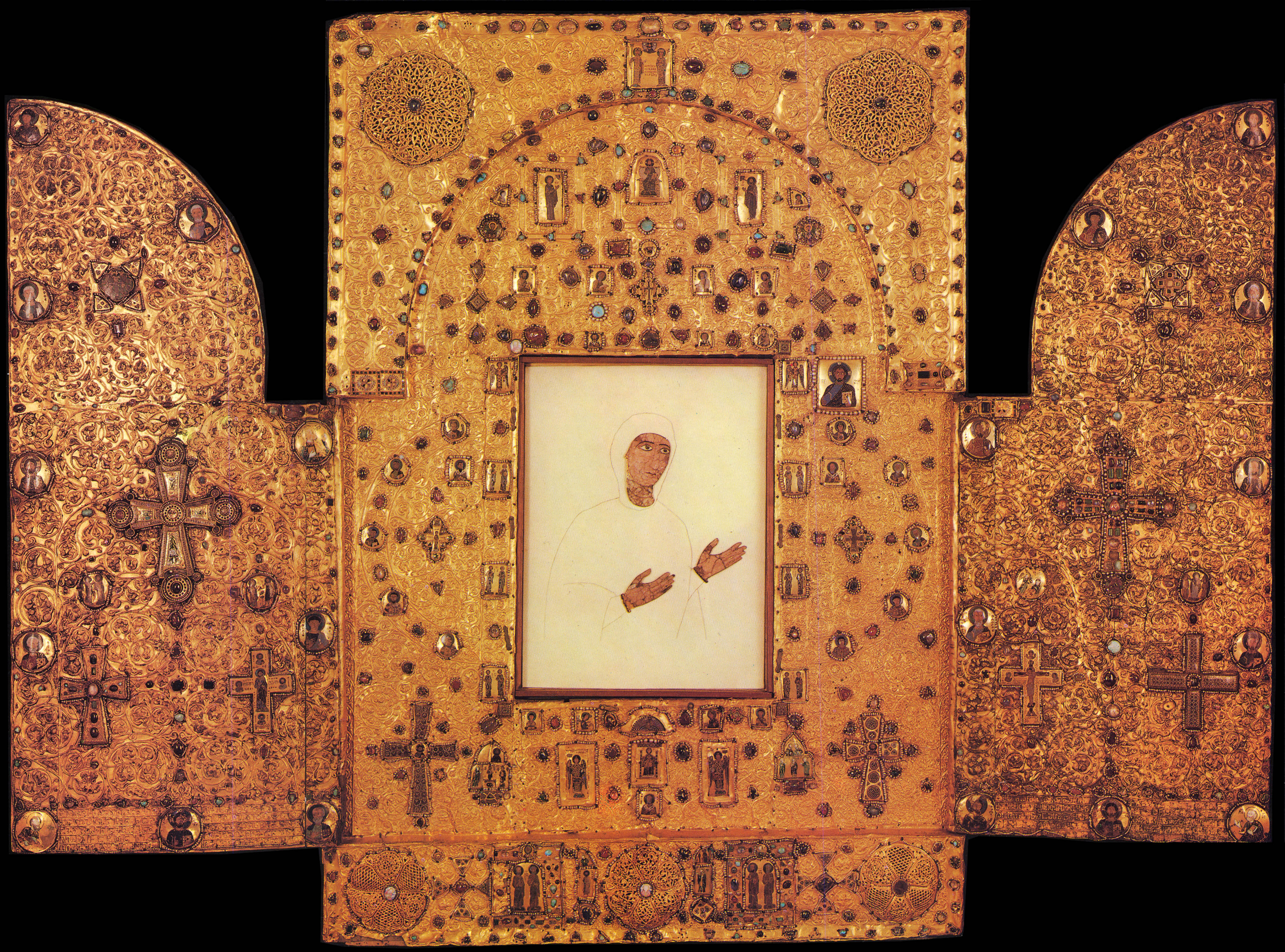
The Khakhuli triptych

== Publications ==
- Botkin, Mikhail P. (1880). Александр Андреевич Иванов: Его жизнь и переписка, 1806–1858 гг (in Russian). St. Petersburg: Mikhail Botkin. OCLC 27355439.

== Sources ==
- Bakaldina, Yelena V. (2019). Академик живописи М. П. Боткин [Mikhail Petrovich Botkin, Academician of Painting] (artbook / exhibition catalogue) (in Russian). Saint Petersburg: Roerich Institute. ISBN 978-5-907223-13-4. OCLC 1137832584.
- Howard, Jeremy (1996). "Botkin". In Turner, Jane (ed.). The Dictionary of Art. Vol. 4. New York: Grove's Dictionaries. p. 489. ISBN 1-884446-00-0. OCLC 1033646743 – via the Internet Archive.
- Voltsenburg, Oskar E. [in Russian]; et al., eds. (1972). "Боткин, Михаил Петрович". Художники народов СССР (in Russian). Vol. 2. Moscow: Iskusstvo. pp. 51–52.
