= Grand Duchess Anastasia Nikolaevna of Russia =

Youngest daughter of Tsar Nicholas II of Russia (1901–1918)

Grand Duchess Anastasia Nikolaevna
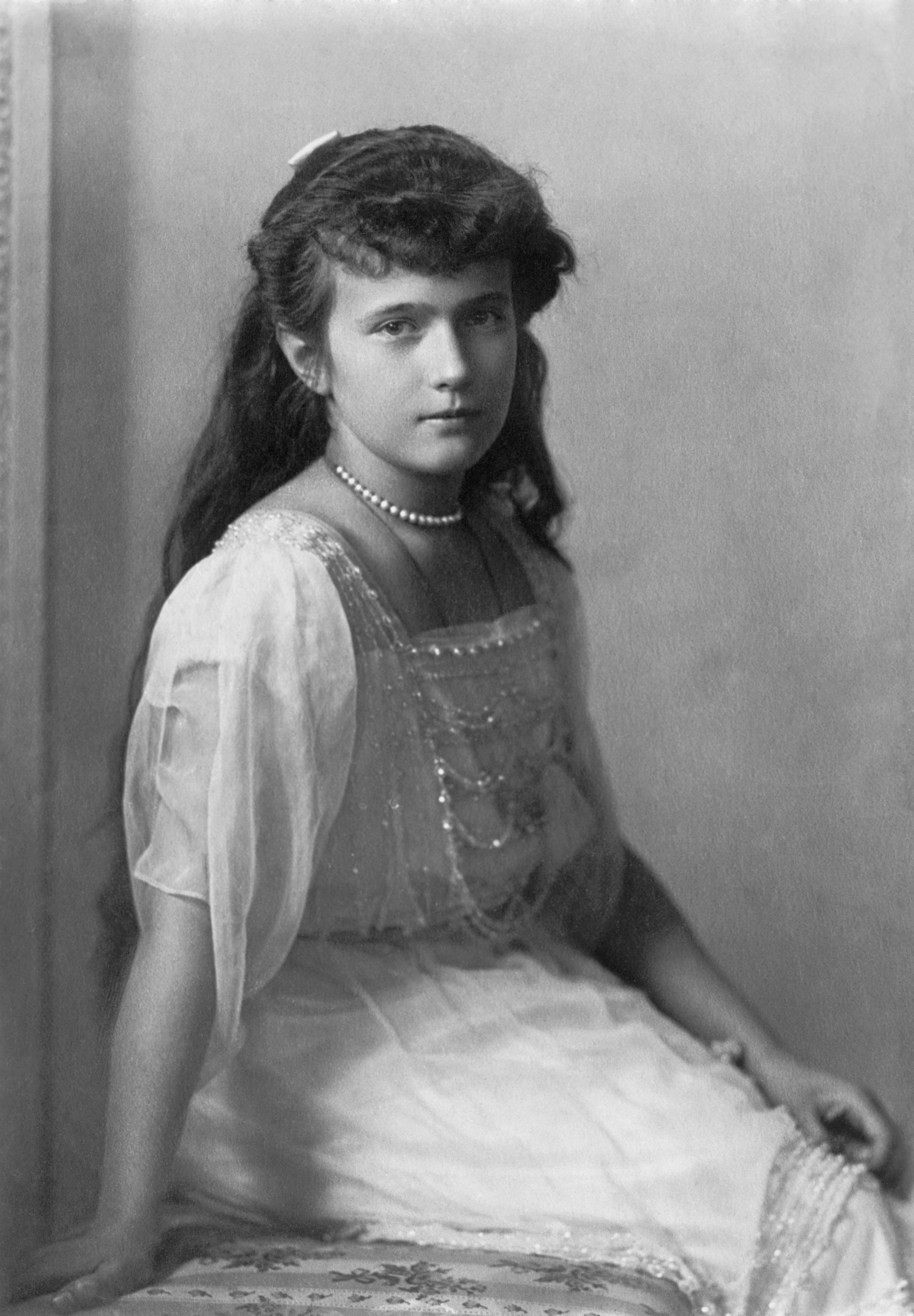
- Anastasia in 1914
- Born: 18 June 1901; Peterhof Palace, Saint Petersburg, Russia
- Died: 17 July 1918 (aged 17); Ipatiev House, Yekaterinburg, Russia
- Cause of death: Murder
- Burial: 17 July 1998; Peter and Paul Cathedral, Saint Petersburg
- House: Holstein-Gottorp-Romanov
- Father: Nicholas II of Russia
- Mother: Alix of Hesse and by Rhine

Grand Duchess Anastasia Nikolaevna of Russia (Russian: Анастасия Николаевна, romanized: Anastasiya Nikolayevna; 18 June [O.S. 5 June] 1901 – 17 July 1918) was the fourth child and youngest daughter of Tsar Nicholas II, the last sovereign of Imperial Russia, and his wife, Tsarina Alexandra Feodorovna.

Anastasia was the younger sister of Grand Duchesses Olga, Tatiana, and Maria (commonly known together as the OTMA sisters) and was an elder sister of Alexei Nikolaevich, Tsarevich of Russia. She was murdered with her family by a group of Bolsheviks in Yekaterinburg on 17 July 1918.

Persistent rumors of her possible escape circulated after her death, fueled by the fact that the location of her burial was unknown during the decades of communist rule. The abandoned mine serving as a mass grave near Yekaterinburg which held the acidified remains of the Tsar, his wife, and three of their daughters was revealed in 1991. These remains were put to rest at Peter and Paul Fortress in 1998. The bodies of Alexei and the remaining daughter—either Anastasia or her older sister Maria—were discovered in 2007. Her purported survival has been conclusively disproven. Scientific analysis including DNA testing confirmed that the remains are those of the imperial family, showing that Anastasia was killed alongside her family.

Several women falsely claimed to have been Anastasia; the best known impostor was Anna Anderson. Anderson's body was cremated upon her death in 1984; DNA testing in 1994 on pieces of Anderson's tissue and hair showed no relation to the Romanov family.

== Biography ==
=== Early years ===
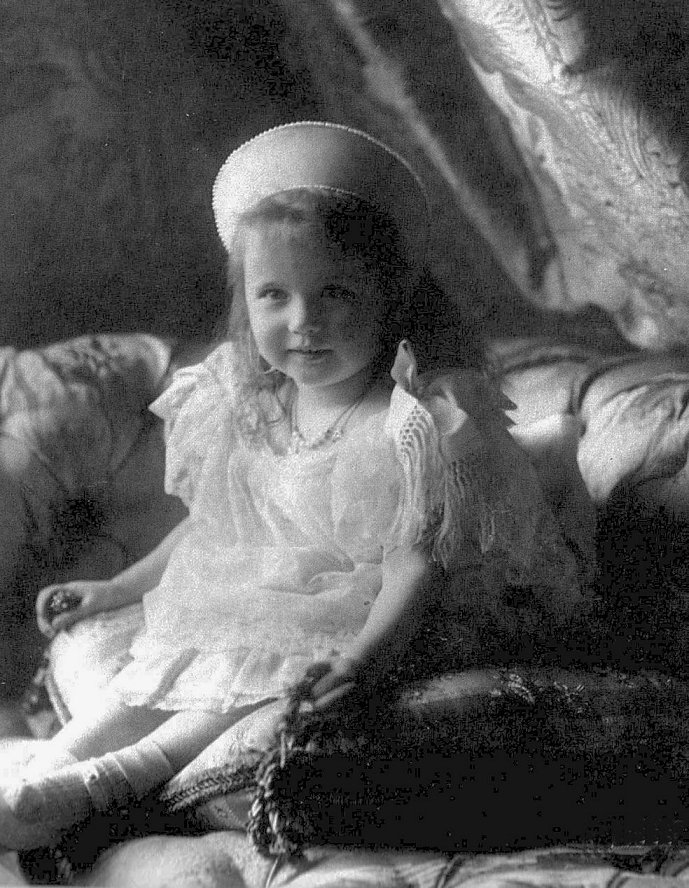
Grand Duchess Anastasia in 1904

Anastasia was born on 18 June 1901 as the fourth child and youngest daughter of Tsar Nicholas II and Tsarina Alexandra. When she was born, her parents and extended family were disappointed that she was a girl. They had hoped for a son who would have become heir apparent to the throne. Her father went for a long walk to compose himself before going to visit his wife and their newborn child for the first time. Her paternal aunt Grand Duchess Xenia Alexandrovna of Russia said, "My God! What a disappointment!... a fourth girl!" Her first cousin twice removed Grand Duke Konstantin Konstantinovich wrote, "Forgive us, Lord, if we all felt disappointment instead of joy. We were so hoping for a boy, and it's a daughter." The travel writer Burton Holmes wrote, "Nicholas would part with half his Empire in exchange for one Imperial boy."

Anastasia was named for the fourth-century martyr St. Anastasia. "Anastasia" is a Greek name (Αναστασία), meaning "of the resurrection", a fact often alluded to later in stories about her rumored survival. Anastasia's title is most precisely translated as "Grand Princess". "Grand Duchess" became the most widely used translation of the title into English from Russian.

The Tsar's children were raised as simply as possible. They slept on hard camp cots without pillows, except when they were ill, took cold baths in the morning, and were expected to tidy their rooms and do needlework to be sold at various charity events when they were not otherwise occupied. Most in the household, including the servants, generally called the Grand Duchess by her first name and patronym, "Anastasia Nikolaevna", and did not use her title or style. She was occasionally called by the French version of her name, "Anastasie", or by the Russian nicknames "Nastasya", "Nastya", "Nastas", or "Nastenka". Other family nicknames for Anastasia were "Malenkaya", meaning "little (one)" in Russian, or "Shvybzik", meaning "merry little one" or "little mischief" in German.

Anastasia and her older sister Maria were known within the family as "The Little Pair". The two girls shared a room, often wore variations of the same dress, and spent much of their time together. Their older sisters Olga and Tatiana also shared a room and were known as "The Big Pair". The four girls sometimes signed letters using the nickname OTMA, which derived from the first letters of their first names.

DNA testing on the remains of the imperial family proved conclusively in 2009 that Anastasia's younger brother, Alexei, suffered from Hemophilia B, a rare form of the disease. His mother and one sister, identified alternatively as Maria or Anastasia, were carriers. Symptomatic carriers of the gene, while not hemophiliacs themselves, can have symptoms of hemophilia including a lower than normal blood-clotting factor that can lead to heavy bleeding. If Anastasia lived to have children of her own, it is genetically probable that they would have been afflicted by the disease.

=== Appearance and personality ===
Anastasia was short and inclined to be chubby, and she had blue eyes and blonde hair. Baroness Sophie Buxhoeveden, her mother's lady-in-waiting, reflected that "her features were regular and finely cut. She had fair hair, fine eyes, with impish laughter in their depths, and dark eyebrows that nearly met." Buxhoeveden believed that Anastasia resembled her mother, saying that she "was more like her mother's than her father's family. She was rather short even at seventeen, and was, then decidedly fat, but it was the fatness of youth. She would have outgrown it, as had her sister Marie."

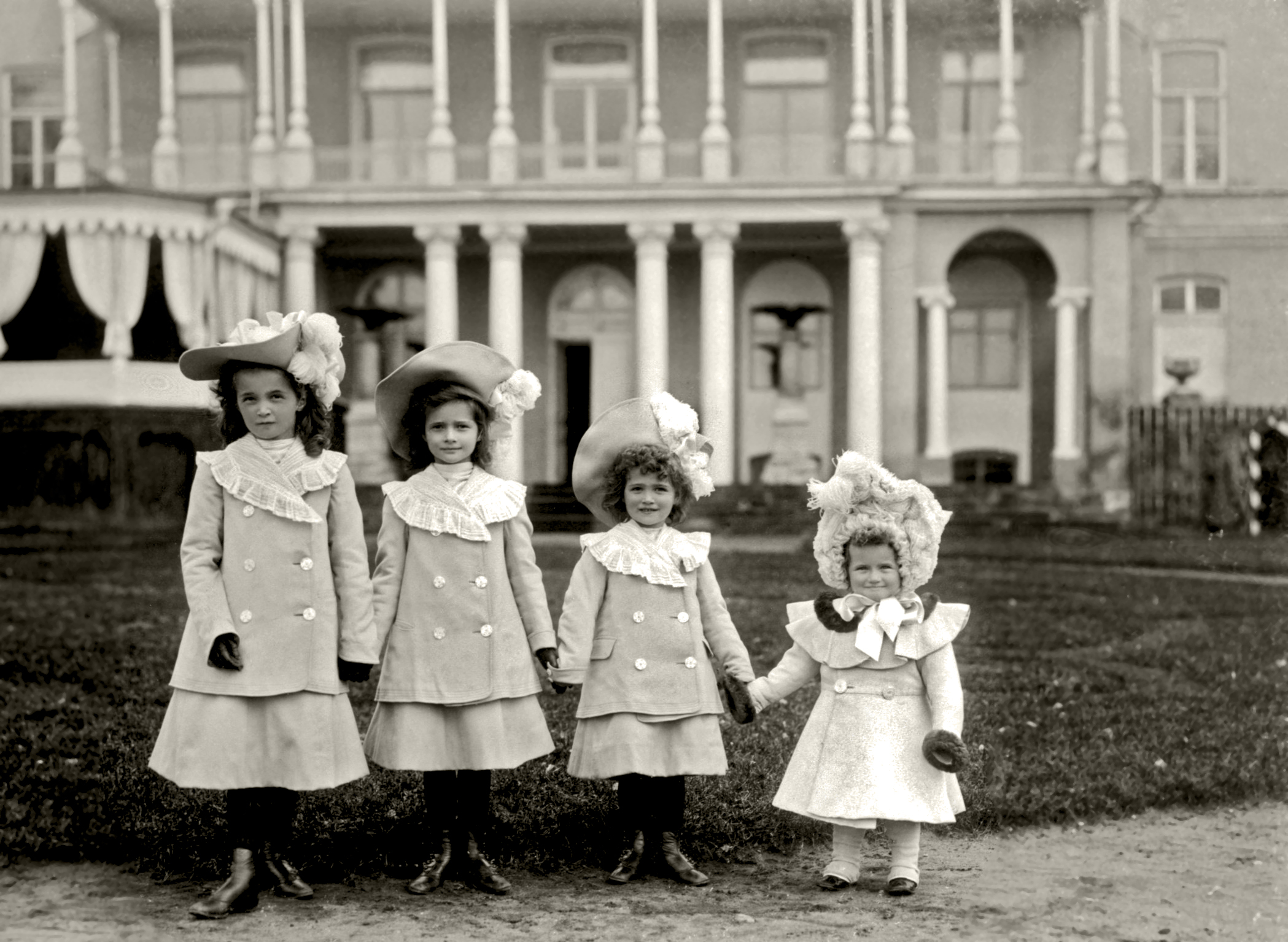
The Grand Duchesses Olga, Tatiana, Maria and Anastasia Nikolaevna possibly either in Cottage Palace in Alexandria Park or Darmstadt, Hesse

The OTMAA Romanovs (Olga, Tatiana, Maria and Anastasia, together with Alexei) playing aboard the yacht Standart, in 1906

Anastasia was a vivacious and energetic child. Margaretta Eagar, a governess to the four grand duchesses, said one person commented that the toddler Anastasia had the greatest personal charm of any child she had ever seen.

While often described as gifted and bright, she was never interested in the restrictions of the school room, according to her tutors Pierre Gilliard and Sydney Gibbes. Gibbes, Gilliard, and ladies-in-waiting Lili Dehn and Anna Vyrubova described Anastasia as lively, mischievous, and a gifted actress. Her sharp, witty remarks sometimes hit sensitive spots. However, she was also very amusing: "Even as a baby she had entertained grave old men, who were her neighbors at table, with her astonishing remarks."

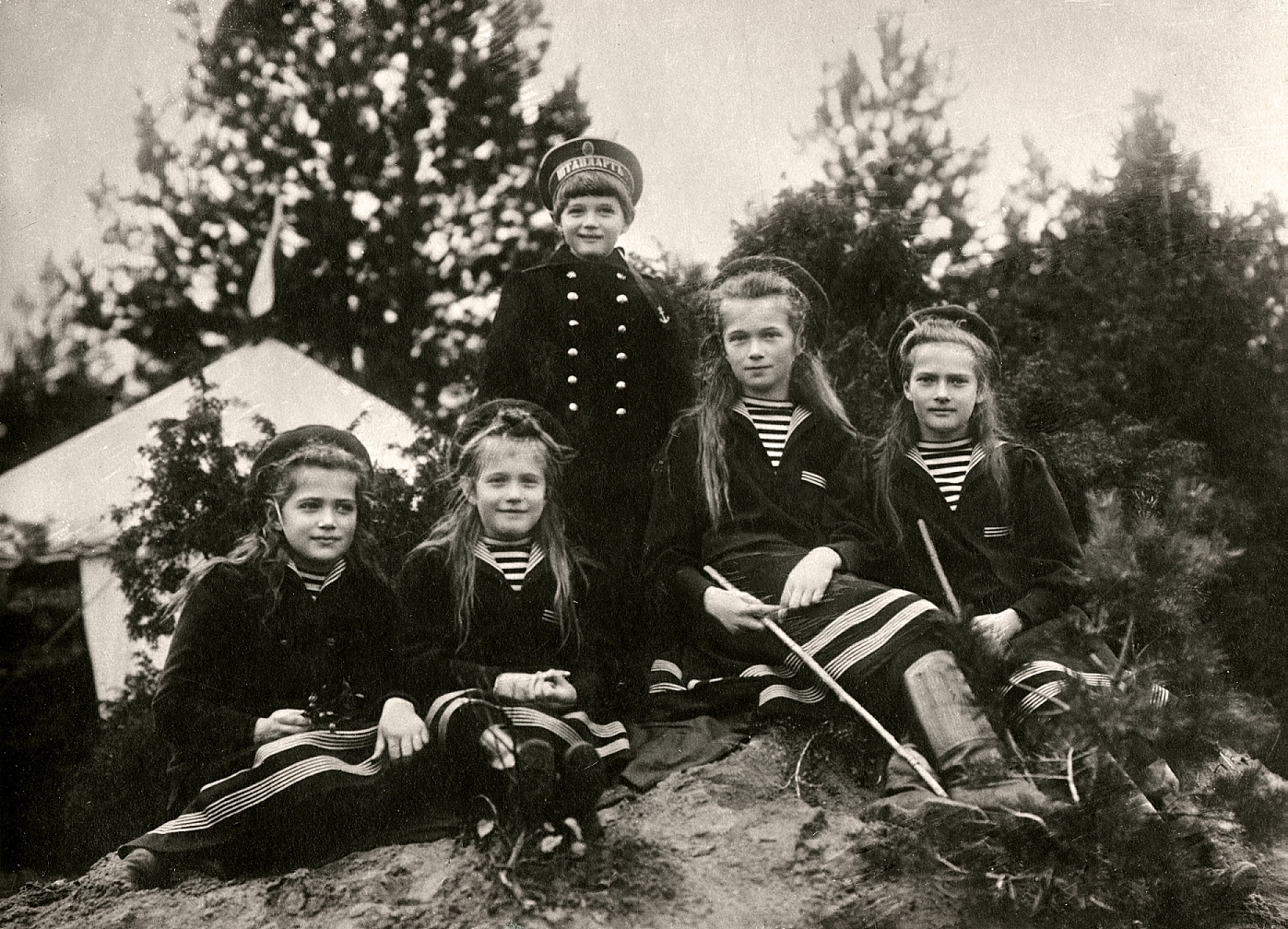
From left to right: Maria, Anastasia, Alexei, Olga and Tatiana at the Gulf of Finland, 1908

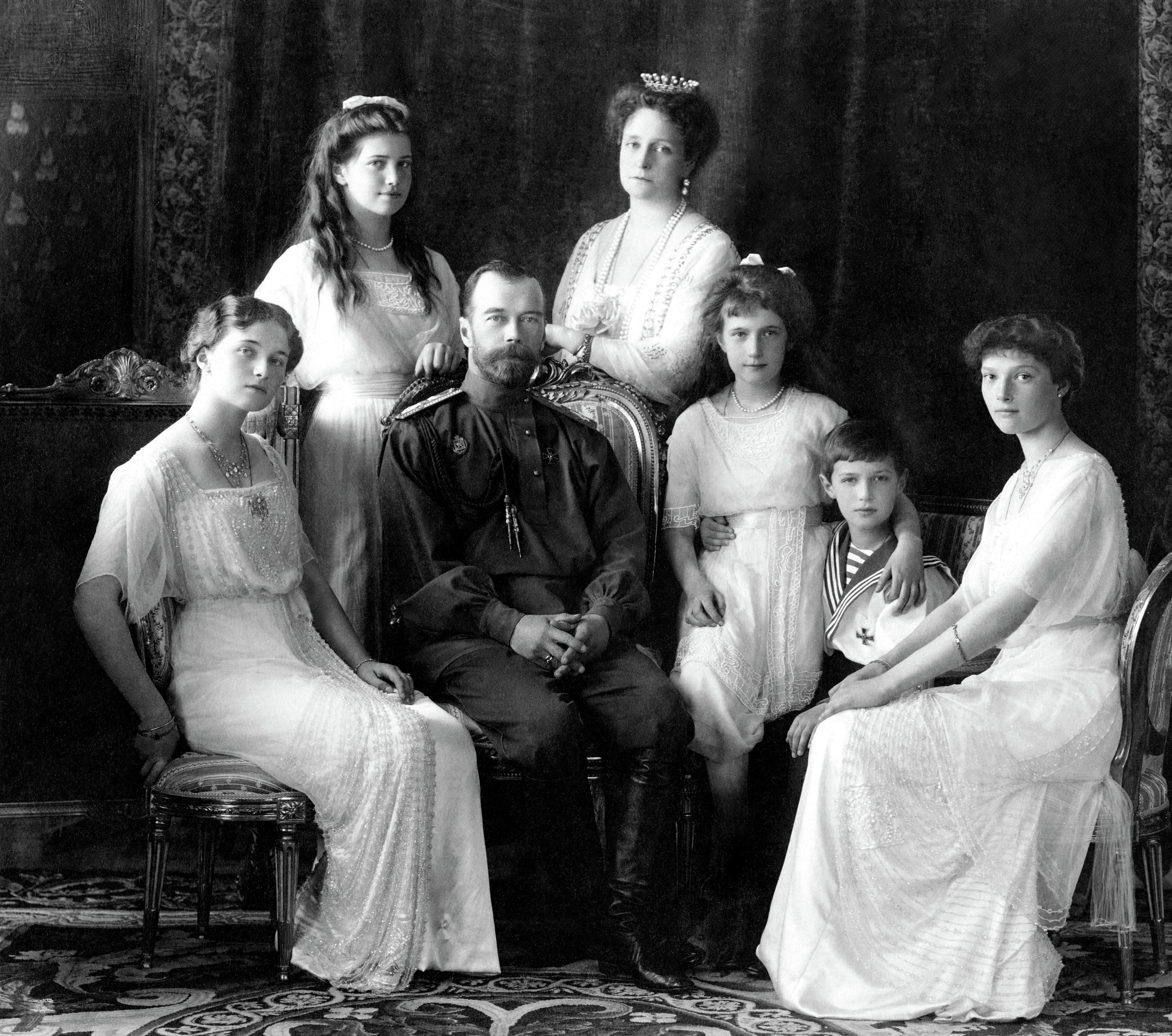
Portrait

Anastasia's daring occasionally exceeded the limits of acceptable behavior. "She undoubtedly held the record for punishable deeds in her family, for in naughtiness she was a true genius", said Gleb Botkin, son of the court physician Yevgeny Botkin, who later died with the family at Yekaterinburg. Anastasia sometimes tripped the servants and played pranks on her tutors. As a child, she would climb trees and refuse to come down. Once, during a snowball fight at the family's Polish estate, Anastasia rolled a rock into a snowball and threw it at her older sister Tatiana, knocking her to the ground. When she was a child, her father had to save her from drowning while they were at Livadia in the Crimea. A distant cousin, Princess Nina Georgievna, recalled that "Anastasia was affronted because the younger Nina was taller than she was. She was less concerned about her appearance than her sisters. Hallie Erminie Rives, a best-selling American author and wife of an American diplomat, described how 10-year-old Anastasia ate chocolates without bothering to remove her long, white opera gloves at the St. Petersburg opera house.

Despite her energy, Anastasia's physical health was sometimes poor. The Grand Duchess suffered from painful bunions, which affected both of her big toes. Anastasia had a weak muscle in her back and was prescribed a massage twice per week. She hid under the bed or in a cupboard to put off receiving the massage. Anastasia's older sister, Maria, reportedly hemorrhaged in December 1914 during an operation to remove her tonsils, according to her paternal aunt Grand Duchess Olga Alexandrovna of Russia, who was interviewed later in her life. The doctor performing the operation was so unnerved that he had to be ordered to continue by Maria's mother. Olga Alexandrovna said she believed all four of her nieces bled more than was normal and believed they were carriers of the hemophilia gene, like their mother.

=== Association with Grigori Rasputin ===
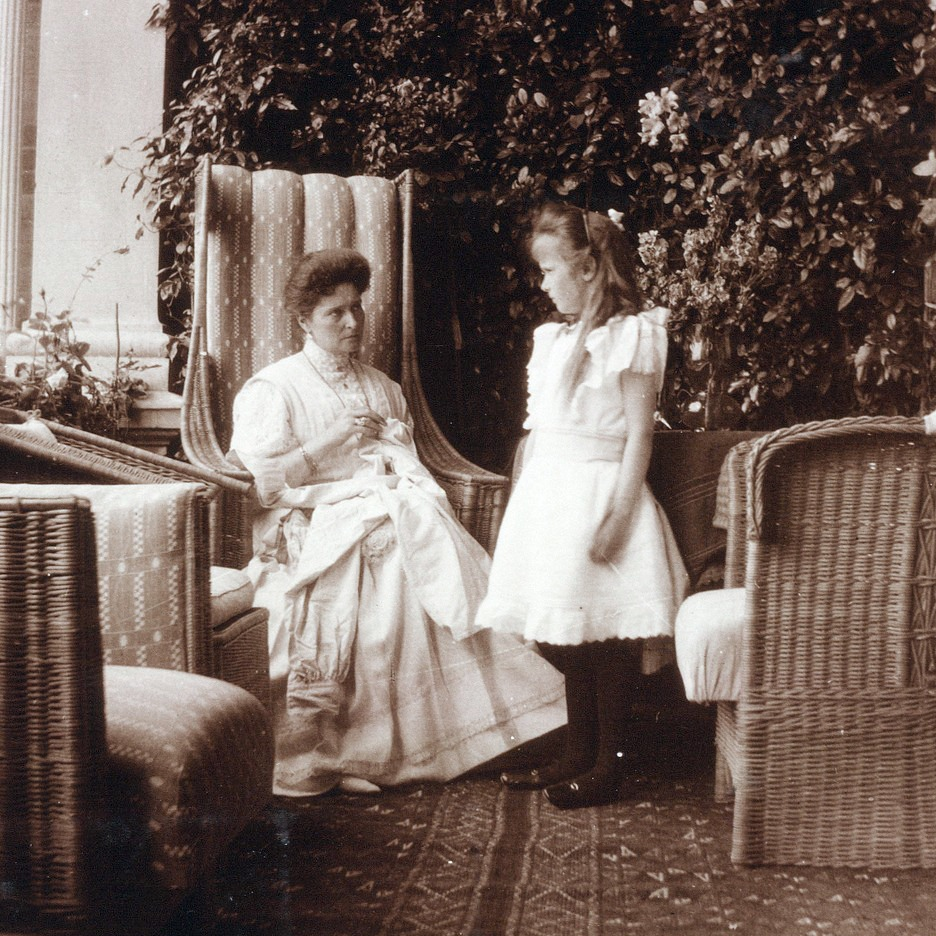
Grand Duchess Anastasia with her mother, Tsarina Alexandra, in about 1908

Her mother relied on the counsel of Grigori Rasputin, a Russian peasant and wandering starets or "holy man", and credited his prayers with saving the ailing Tsarevich on numerous occasions. Anastasia and her siblings were taught to view Rasputin as "Our Friend" and to share confidences with him. In the autumn of 1907, Anastasia's aunt Grand Duchess Olga Alexandrovna of Russia was escorted to the nursery by the Tsar to meet Rasputin. Anastasia, her sisters and brother Alexei were all wearing their long white nightgowns. "All the children seemed to like him," Olga Alexandrovna recalled. "They were completely at ease with him." Rasputin's friendship with the imperial children was evident in some of the messages he sent to them. In February 1909, Rasputin sent the imperial children a telegram, advising them to "Love the whole of God's nature, the whole of His creation in particular this earth. The Mother of God was always occupied with flowers and needlework."

However, one of the girls' governesses, Sofia Ivanovna Tyutcheva, was horrified in 1910 that Rasputin was permitted access to the nursery when the four girls were in their nightgowns and wanted him barred. Nicholas asked Rasputin to avoid going to the nurseries in the future. The children were aware of the tension and feared that their mother would be angered by Tyutcheva's actions. "I am so afr(aid) that S.I. (governess Sofia Ivanovna Tyutcheva) can speak ... about our friend something bad," Anastasia's twelve-year-old sister Tatiana wrote to their mother on 8 March 1910. "I hope our nurse will be nice to our friend now."

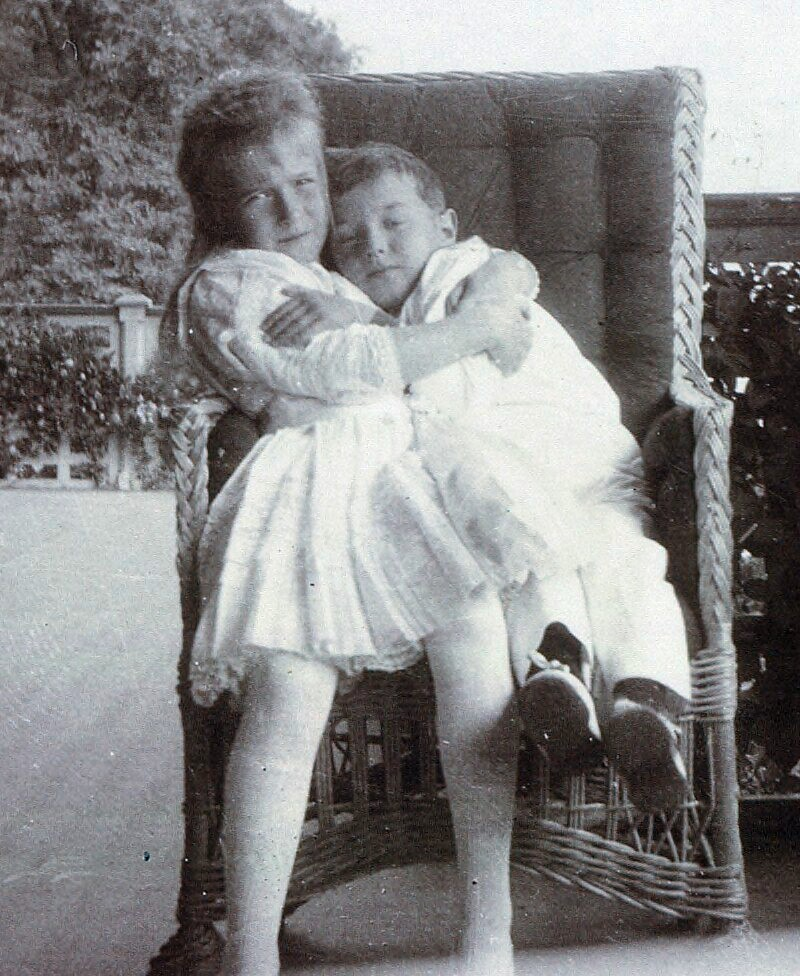
Grand Duchess Anastasia with her brother Alexei

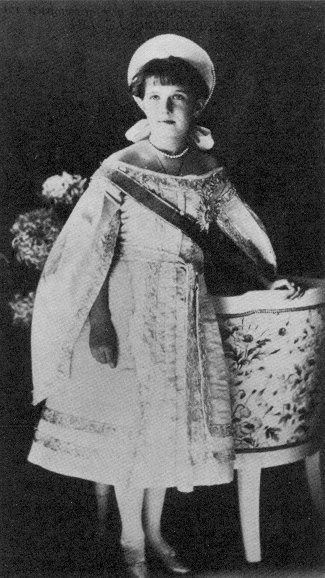
Grand Duchess Anastasia in court dress in 1910

Tyutcheva was eventually fired. She took her story to other members of the family. While Rasputin's visits to the children were, by all accounts, completely innocent in nature, the family was scandalized. Tyutcheva told Nicholas's sister, Grand Duchess Xenia Alexandrovna of Russia, that Rasputin visited the girls, talked with them while they were getting ready for bed, and hugged and patted them. Tyutcheva said the children had been taught not to discuss Rasputin with her and were careful to hide his visits from the nursery staff. Xenia wrote on 15 March 1910, that she could not understand "the attitude of Alix and the children to that sinister Grigory (whom they consider to be almost a saint, when in fact he's only a khlyst!)"

In the spring of 1910, Maria Ivanovna Vishnyakova, a royal governess, claimed that Rasputin had raped her. Vishnyakova said the empress refused to believe her account of the assault, and insisted that "everything Rasputin does is holy." Grand Duchess Olga Alexandrovna was told that Vishnyakova's claim had been immediately investigated, but instead "they caught the young woman in bed with a Cossack of the Imperial Guard." Vishnyakova was kept from seeing Rasputin after she made her accusation and was eventually dismissed from her post in 1913.

However, rumors persisted and it was later whispered in society that Rasputin had seduced not only the Tsarina but also the four grand duchesses. This was followed by circulation of pornographic cartoons, which depicted Rasputin having relations with the Empress, her four daughters and Anna Vyrubova. After the scandal, Nicholas ordered Rasputin to leave St. Petersburg for a time, much to Alexandra's displeasure, and Rasputin went on a pilgrimage to Palestine. Despite the rumors, the imperial family's association with Rasputin continued until his murder on 17 December 1916. "Our Friend is so contented with our girlies, says they have gone through heavy 'courses' for their age and their souls have much developed", Alexandra wrote to Nicholas on 6 December 1916.

In his memoirs, A. A. Mordvinov reported that the four grand duchesses appeared "cold and visibly terribly upset" by Rasputin's death, and sat "huddled up closely together" on a sofa in one of their bedrooms on the night they received the news. Mordvinov recalled that the young women were in a gloomy mood and seemed to sense the political upheaval that was about to be unleashed. Rasputin was buried with an icon signed on its reverse by Anastasia, her mother and her sisters. She attended his funeral on 21 December 1916, and her family planned to build a church over the site of Rasputin's grave. After they were killed by the Bolsheviks, it was discovered Anastasia and her sisters were all wearing amulets bearing Rasputin's picture and a prayer.

=== Captivity during World War I and Russian Revolution ===
During World War I, Anastasia, along with her sister Maria, visited wounded soldiers at a private hospital in the grounds at Tsarskoye Selo. The two teenagers, too young to become Red Cross nurses like their mother and elder sisters, played games of checkers and billiards with the soldiers and tried to lift their spirits. Felix Dassel, who was treated at the hospital and knew Anastasia, recalled that the grand duchess had a "laugh like a squirrel", and walked rapidly "as though she tripped along."

In February 1917, Anastasia and her family were placed under house arrest at the Alexander Palace in Tsarskoye Selo during the Russian Revolution. Nicholas II abdicated on 15 March [O.S. 2 March] 1917. As the Bolsheviks approached, Alexander Kerensky of the Provisional Government had them moved to Tobolsk, Siberia, where they were housed in the Governor's Mansion. After the Bolsheviks seized majority control of Russia, Anastasia and her family were moved to the Ipatiev House, or House of Special Purpose, at Yekaterinburg.

The stress and uncertainty of captivity took their toll on Anastasia as well as her family. "Goodby [sic]", she wrote to a friend in the winter of 1917. "Don't forget us." At Tobolsk, she wrote a melancholy theme for her English tutor, about "Evelyn Hope", a poem by Robert Browning about a girl:

"When she died she was only sixteen years old ... Ther(e) was a man who loved her without having seen her but (k)new her very well. And she he(a)rd of him also. He never could tell her that he loved her, and now she was dead. But still he thought that when he and she will live [their] next life whenever it will be that ...", she wrote.

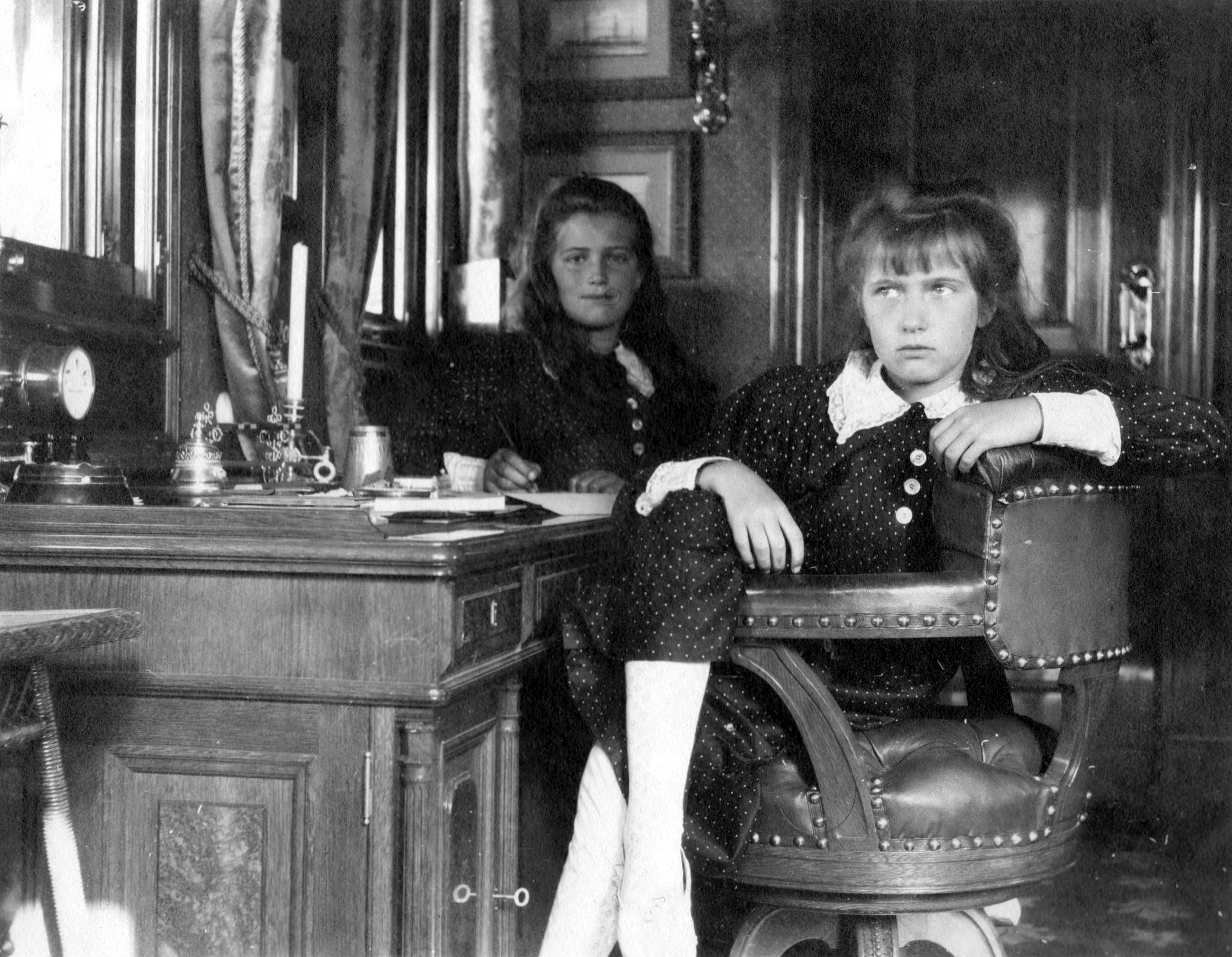
Maria and Anastasia in Nicholas II's stateroom aboard the Standart, 1911

Upon arriving in Yekaterinburg, Pierre Gilliard recalled his last sight of the children:

The sailor Nagorny, who attended to Alexei Nikolaevitch, passed my window carrying the sick boy in his arms, behind him came the Grand Duchesses loaded with valises and small personal belongings. I tried to get out, but was roughly pushed back into the carriage by the sentry. I came back to the window. Tatiana Nikolayevna came last carrying her little dog and struggling to drag a heavy brown valise. It was raining and I saw her feet sink into the mud at every step. Nagorny tried to come to her assistance; he was roughly pushed back by one of the commisars ...

Baroness Sophie Buxhoeveden told of her sad last glimpse of Anastasia:

Once, standing on some steps at the door of a house close by, I saw a hand and a pink-sleeved arm opening the topmost pane. According to the blouse the hand must have belonged either to the Grand Duchess Marie or Anastasia. They could not see me through their windows, and this was to be the last glimpse that I was to have of any of them!

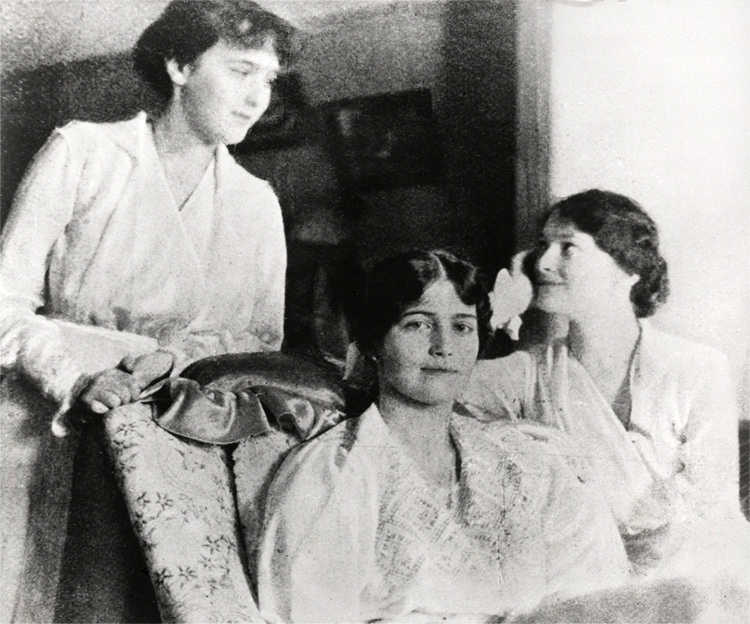
Grand Duchesses Anastasia, Maria, and Tatiana Nikolaevna at Tsarskoye Selo in the spring of 1917

However, even in the last months of her life, she found ways to enjoy herself. She and other members of the household performed plays for the enjoyment of their parents and others in the spring of 1918. Anastasia's performance made everyone howl with laughter, according to her tutor Sydney Gibbes.

On 7 May 1918, in a letter from Tobolsk to her sister Maria in Yekaterinburg, Anastasia described a moment of joy despite her sadness, loneliness and worry for the sick Alexei:

We played on the swing, that was when I roared with laughter, the fall was so wonderful! Indeed! I told the sisters about it so many times yesterday that they got quite fed up, but I could go on telling it masses of times ... What weather we've had! One could simply shout with joy.

In his memoirs, one of the guards at the Ipatiev House, Alexander Strekotin, remembered Anastasia as "very friendly and full of fun", while another guard said Anastasia was "a very charming devil! She was mischievous and, I think, rarely tired. She was lively, and was fond of performing comic mimes with the dogs, as though they were performing in a circus." Yet another of the guards, however, called the youngest grand duchess "offensive and a terrorist" and complained that her occasionally provocative comments sometimes caused tension in the ranks. Anastasia and her sisters helped their maid darn stockings and assisted the cook in making bread and other kitchen chores while they were in captivity at the Ipatiev House.

Anastasia Nikolaevna Romanova at the Feodorovsky Gorodok private hospital, 1915

Anastasia Nikolaevna, Maria Nikolaevna, General Vladimir Nikolaevich Voyeikov and Tatiana Nikolaevna in Mogilev, August 1916

In the summer, the privations of the captivity, including their closer confinement at the Ipatiev House negatively affected the family. On 14 July 1918, local priests at Yekaterinburg conducted a private church service for the family. They reported that Anastasia and her family, contrary to custom, fell on their knees during the prayer for the dead, and that the girls had become despondent and hopeless, and no longer sang the replies in the service. Noticing this dramatic change in their demeanor since his last visit, one priest told the other, "Something has happened to them in there." But the next day, on 15 July 1918, Anastasia and her sisters appeared in good spirits as they joked and helped move the beds in their shared bedroom so that cleaning women could clean the floors. They helped the women scrub the floors and whispered to them when the guards were not watching. Anastasia stuck her tongue out at Yakov Yurovsky, the head of the detachment, when he momentarily turned his back and left the room.

=== Death ===
After the Bolshevik revolution in October 1917, Russia quickly disintegrated into civil war. Negotiations for the release of the Romanovs between their Bolshevik (commonly referred to as 'Reds') captors and their extended family, many of whom were prominent members of the royal houses of Europe, stalled. As the Whites (anti-Bolshevik forces, although not necessarily supportive of the Tsar) advanced toward Yekaterinburg, the Reds were in a precarious situation. The Reds knew Yekaterinburg would fall to the better manned and equipped White Army. When the Whites reached Yekaterinburg, the imperial family had simply disappeared. The most widely accepted account was that the family had been murdered. This was due to an investigation by White Army investigator Nicholas Sokolov, who came to the conclusion based on items that had belonged to the family being found thrown down a mine shaft at Ganina Yama.

The "Yurovsky Note", an account of the event filed by Yurovsky to his Bolshevik superiors following the killings, was found in 1989 and detailed in Edvard Radzinsky's 1992 book, The Last Tsar. According to the note, on the night of the deaths, the family was awakened and told to dress. They were told they were being moved to a new location to ensure their safety in anticipation of the violence that might ensue when the White Army reached Yekaterinburg. Once dressed, the family and the small circle of servants who had remained with them were herded into a small room in the house's sub-basement and told to wait. Alexandra and Alexei sat in chairs provided by guards at the Empress's request.

After several minutes, the guards entered the room, led by Yurovsky, who quickly informed the Tsar and his family that they were to be executed. The Tsar had time to say only "What?" and turn to his family before he was killed by several bullets to the chest (not, as is commonly stated, to the head; his skull, recovered in 1991, bears no bullet wounds). The Tsarina and her daughter Olga tried to make the sign of the cross but were killed in the initial volley of bullets fired by the executioners. The rest of the Imperial retinue were shot in short order, with the exception of Anna Demidova, Alexandra's maid. Demidova survived the initial onslaught but was quickly stabbed to death against the back wall of the basement while trying to defend herself with a small pillow she had carried into the sub-basement that was filled with precious gems and jewels.

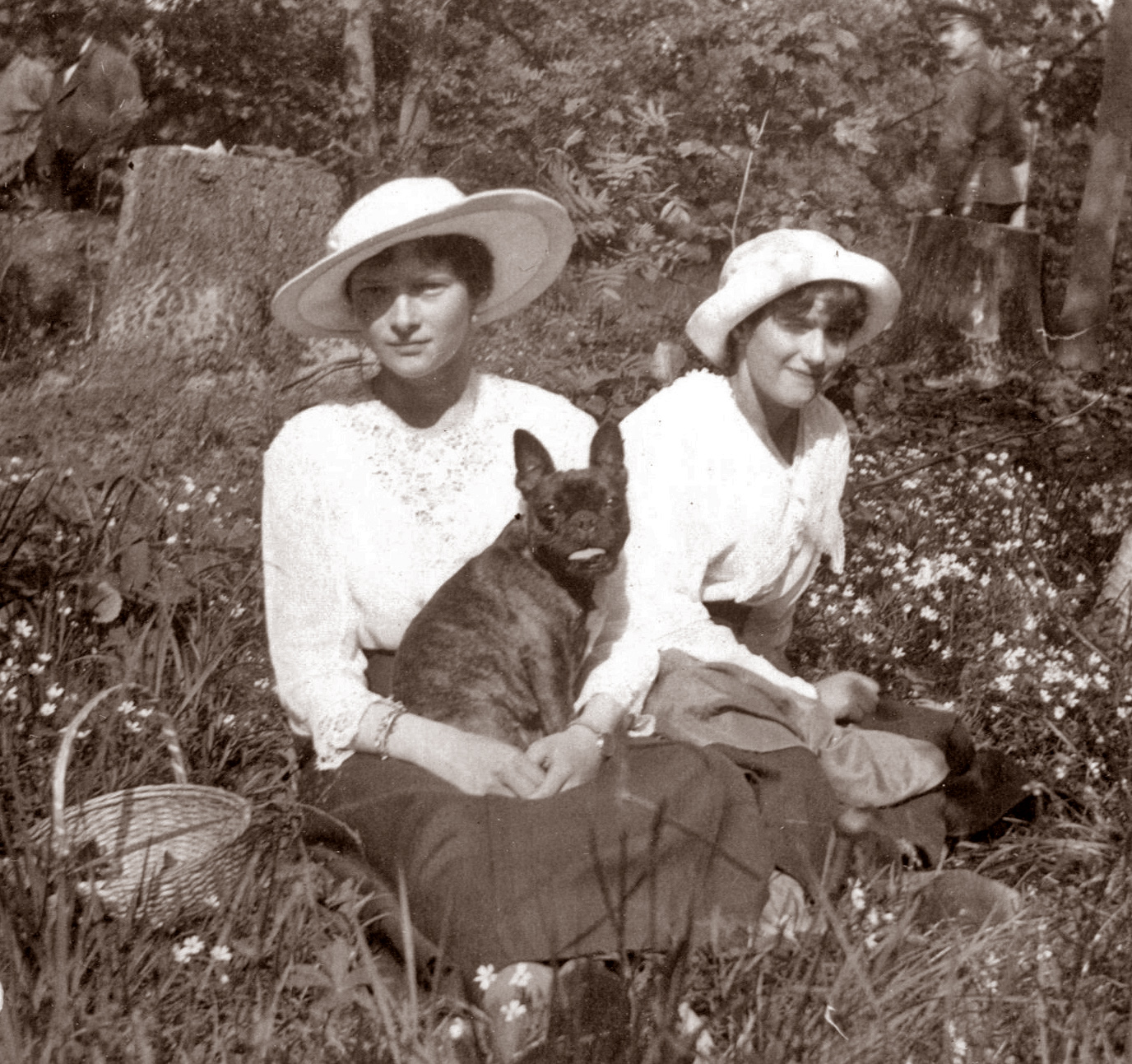
Grand Duchesses Tatiana and Anastasia and the dog Ortipo in captivity at Tsarskoe Selo in the spring of 1917

The "Yurovsky Note" further reported that once the thick smoke that had filled the room from so many weapons being fired in such close proximity cleared, it was discovered that the executioners' bullets had ricocheted off the corsets of two or three of the Grand Duchesses. The executioners later came to find out that this was because the family's crown jewels and diamonds had been sewn inside the linings of the corsets to hide them from their captors. The corsets thus served as a form of "armor" against the bullets. Anastasia and Maria were said to have crouched up against a wall, covering their heads in terror, until they were shot down by bullets, recalled Yurovsky. However, another guard, Peter Ermakov, told his wife that Anastasia had been finished off with bayonets. As the bodies were carried out, one or more of the girls cried out, and were clubbed on the back of the head, wrote Yurovsky.

== False reports of survival ==
Anastasia's supposed escape and possible survival was one of the most popular historical mysteries of the 20th century, provoking many books and films. At least ten women claimed to be her, offering varying stories as to how she had survived. Anna Anderson, the best known Anastasia impostor, first surfaced publicly between 1920 and 1922. She contended that she had feigned death among the bodies of her family and servants, and was able to make her escape with the help of a compassionate guard who noticed she was still breathing and took pity upon her. Her legal battle for recognition from 1938 to 1970 continued a lifelong controversy and was the longest running case ever heard by the German courts, where it was officially filed. The final decision of the court was that Anderson had not provided sufficient proof to claim the identity of the grand duchess.

Anderson died in 1984 and her body was cremated. DNA tests were conducted in 1994 on a tissue sample from Anderson located in a hospital and the blood of Prince Philip, Duke of Edinburgh, a great-nephew of Empress Alexandra. According to Dr Gill who conducted the tests, "If you accept that these samples came from Anna Anderson, then Anna Anderson could not be related to Tsar Nicholas or Tsarina Alexandra." Anderson's mitochondrial DNA was a match with a great-nephew of Franziska Schanzkowska, a missing Polish factory worker. Some supporters of Anderson's claim acknowledged that the DNA tests proving she could not have been the Grand Duchess had "won the day".

Other lesser known claimants were Nadezhda Ivanovna Vasilyeva and Eugenia Smith. Two young women claiming to be Anastasia and her sister Maria were taken in by a priest in the Ural Mountains in 1919 where they lived as nuns until their deaths in 1964. They were buried under the names Anastasia and Maria Nikolaevna.

Rumors of Anastasia's survival were embellished with various contemporary reports of trains and houses being searched for "Anastasia Romanov" by Bolshevik soldiers and secret police. When she was briefly imprisoned at Perm in 1918, Princess Helena Petrovna, the wife of Anastasia's distant cousin, Prince John Constantinovich of Russia, reported that a guard brought a girl who called herself Anastasia Romanova to her cell and asked if the girl was the daughter of the Tsar. Helena Petrovna said she did not recognize the girl and the guard took her away. Although other witnesses in Perm later reported that they saw Anastasia, her mother and sisters in Perm after the murders, this story is now widely discredited. Rumors that they were alive were fueled by deliberate misinformation designed to hide the fact that the family was dead. A few days after they had been murdered, the German government sent several telegrams to Russia demanding "the safety of the princesses of German blood". Russia had recently signed a peace treaty with the Germans, and did not want to upset them by letting them know the women were dead, so they told them they had been moved to a safer location.

In another incident, eight witnesses reported the recapture of a young woman after an apparent escape attempt in September 1918 at a railway station at Siding 37, northwest of Perm. These witnesses were Maxim Grigoyev, Tatiana Sitnikova (and her son Fyodor Sitnikov), Ivan Kuklin and Matrina Kuklina, Vassily Ryabov, Ustinya Varankina, and Dr Pavel Utkin, a physician who treated the girl after the incident. Some of the witnesses identified the girl as Anastasia when they were shown photographs of the grand duchess by White Russian Army investigators. Utkin also told the White Russian Army investigators that the injured girl, whom he treated at Cheka headquarters in Perm, told him, "I am the daughter of the ruler, Anastasia." Utkin obtained a prescription from a pharmacy for a patient named "N" at the orders of the secret police. White Army investigators later independently located records for the prescription. During the same time period in mid-1918, there were several reports of young people in Russia passing themselves off as Romanov escapees. Boris Soloviev, the husband of Rasputin's daughter Maria, defrauded prominent Russian families by asking for money for a Romanov impostor to escape to China. Soloviev also found young women willing to masquerade as one of the grand duchesses to assist in deceiving the families he had defrauded.

Some biographers' accounts speculated that the opportunity for one or more of the guards to rescue a survivor existed. Yakov Yurovsky demanded that the guards come to his office and turn over items they had stolen following the murder. There was reportedly a span of time when the bodies of the victims were left largely unattended in the truck, in the basement and in the corridor of the house. Some guards who had not participated in the murders and had been sympathetic to the grand duchesses were reportedly left in the basement with the bodies.

== Romanov graves and DNA proof ==
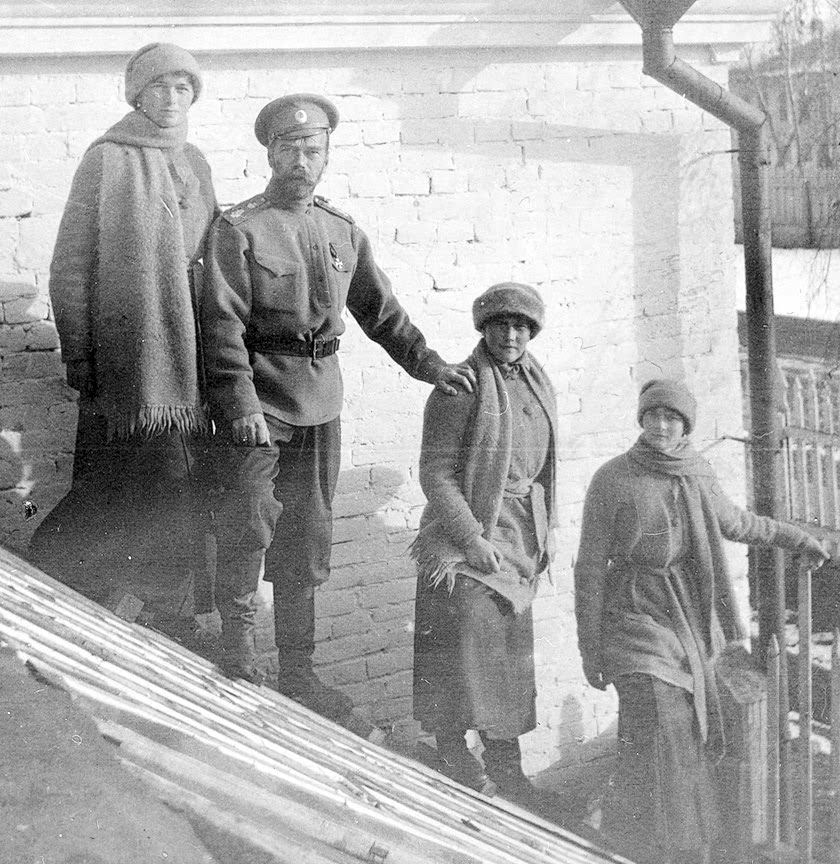
From left to right, Grand Duchess Olga Nikolaevna of Russia, Tsar Nicholas II, Grand Duchess Anastasia Nikolaevna of Russia and Grand Duchess Tatiana Nikolaevna of Russia in captivity at Tobolsk in the winter of 1917

In 1991, the presumed burial site of the imperial family and their servants was excavated in the woods outside Yekaterinburg. The grave had been found nearly a decade earlier, but was kept hidden by its discoverers from the Communists who were still ruling Russia at the time. The grave only held nine of the expected eleven sets of remains. DNA and skeletal analysis matched these remains to Tsar Nicholas II, Tsarina Alexandra, and three of the four grand duchesses (Olga, Tatiana and presumably Maria). The other remains, with unrelated DNA, correspond to the family's doctor (Yevgeny Botkin), their valet (Alexei Trupp), their cook (Ivan Kharitonov), and Alexandra's maid (Anna Demidova). Forensic expert William R. Maples found that the Tsarevitch Alexei and Anastasia's bodies were missing from the family's grave. Russian scientists contested this conclusion, however, claiming it was the body of Maria that was missing. The Russians identified the body as that of Anastasia by using a computer program to compare photos of the youngest grand duchess with the skulls of the victims from the mass grave. They estimated the height and width of the skulls where pieces of bone were missing. American scientists found this method inexact.

American scientists thought the missing body to be Anastasia because none of the female skeletons showed the evidence of immaturity, such as an immature collarbone, undescended wisdom teeth, or immature vertebrae in the back, that they would have expected to find in a seventeen-year-old. In 1998, when the remains of the imperial family were finally interred, a body measuring approximately 170 centimetres (5 ft 7 in) was buried under the name of Anastasia. Photographs taken of her standing beside her three sisters up until six months before the murders demonstrate that Anastasia was several inches shorter than all of them. Her mother commented on sixteen-year-old Anastasia's short stature in a 15 December 1917 letter, written seven months before the murders. "Anastasia, to her despair, is now very fat, as Maria was, round and fat to the waist, with short legs. I do hope she will grow." Scientists considered it unlikely that the teenager could have grown so much in the last months of her life. Her actual height was approximately 157 centimetres (5 ft 2 in).

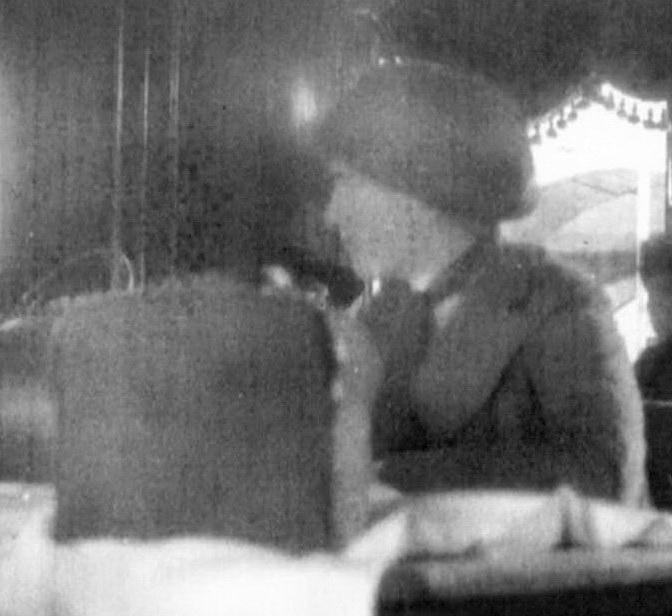
Grand Duchess Anastasia Nikolaevna of Russia aboard the Rus, the ship that ferried her to Yekaterinburg in May 1918. This is the last known photograph of Anastasia.

The account of the "Yurovsky Note" indicated that two of the bodies were removed from the main grave and cremated at an undisclosed area in order to further disguise the burials of the Tsar and his retinue if the remains were discovered by the Whites, since the body count would not be correct. Searches of the area in subsequent years failed to turn up a cremation site or the remains of the two missing Romanov children.

On 23 August 2007, a Russian archaeologist announced the discovery of two burned, partial skeletons at a bonfire site near Yekaterinburg that appeared to match the site described in Yurovsky's memoirs. The archaeologists said the bones were from a boy who was roughly between the ages of twelve and fifteen years at the time of his death and of a young woman who was roughly between the ages of fifteen and nineteen years old. Anastasia was seventeen years and one month old at the time of the assassination, while her sister Maria was nineteen years, one month old and her brother Alexei was two weeks shy of his fourteenth birthday. Anastasia's elder sisters Olga and Tatiana were twenty-two and twenty-one years old respectively at the time of the assassination. Along with the remains of the two bodies, archaeologists found "shards of a container of sulfuric acid, nails, metal strips from a wooden box, and bullets of various caliber". The site was initially found with metal detectors and by using metal rods as probes.

DNA testing by multiple international laboratories including the Armed Forces DNA Identification Laboratory and Innsbruck Medical University confirmed that the remains belong to the Tsarevich Alexei and to one of his sisters, proving conclusively that all family members, including Anastasia, died in 1918. The parents and all five children are now accounted for, and each has his or her own unique DNA profile. While the tests have confirmed that all the Romanov bodies have been found, one of the studies was still unsure which body from the two graves was Maria's and which was Anastasia's.

== Sainthood ==
Saint Anastasia Romanova

Grand Duchess and Passion bearer (Note: Title used for Romanov Saints by Moscow Patriarchate) or Martyr (Note: Title used for Romanov Saints by ROCOR)
- Venerated in: Eastern Orthodox Church
- Canonized: 1981 by Russian Orthodox Church Abroad; 2000 by Russian Orthodox Church
- Major shrine: Church on Blood, Yekaterinburg, Russia
- Feast: 17 July

In 2000, Anastasia and her family were canonized as passion bearers by the Russian Orthodox Church. The family had previously been canonized in 1981 by the Russian Orthodox Church Abroad as holy martyrs. The bodies of Tsar Nicholas II, Tsarina Alexandra, and three of their daughters were finally interred in the St. Catherine Chapel at Saints Peter and Paul Cathedral, St Petersburg on 17 July 1998, eighty years after they were murdered. As of 2018 the bones of Alexei and Maria (or possibly Anastasia) were still being held by the Orthodox Church.

== Depictions in art, media, and literature ==
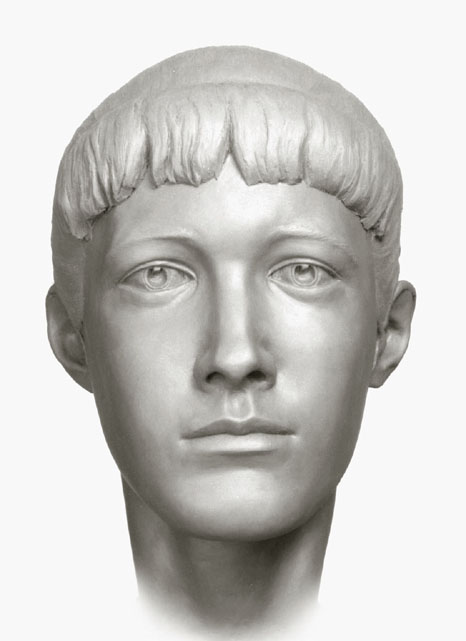
Forensic facial reconstruction of Grand Duchess Anastasia

The purported survival of Anastasia has been the subject of cinema (such as the 1997 animated film and the 1956 film that inspired it starring Ingrid Bergman and Yul Brynner), made-for-television films, and a Broadway musical based on the 1997 animated film. The earliest, made in 1928, was called Clothes Make the Woman. The story followed a woman who turns up to play the part of a rescued Anastasia for a Hollywood film, and ends up being recognized by the Russian soldier who originally rescued her from her would-be assassins.

== Bibliography ==
- Bokhanov, Alexander; Knodt, Manfred; Oustimenko, Vladimir; Peregudova, Zinaida; Tyutynnik, Lyubov (1993). The Romanovs: Love, Power, and Tragedy. London: Leppi Publications. ISBN 0-9521644-0-X.
- Buxhoeveden, Sophie (1928). The Life and Tragedy of Alexandra Feodorovna, Empress of Russia. London: Longmans, Green & Co. Available at alexanderpalace.org, archive.org and openlibrary.org.
- Buxhoeveden, Sophie (1929). Left Behind: Fourteen Months in Siberia During the Revolution, December 1917 – February 1919. London: Longmans, Green & Co. Available at alexanderpalace.org.
- Christopher, Peter; Kurth, Peter; Radzinsky, Edvard (1995). Tsar: The Lost World of Nicholas and Alexandra. Boston: Little Brown and Co. ISBN 0-316-50787-3
- Dehn, Lili (1922). The Real Tsaritsa. London: Butterworth via alexanderpalace.org. Also available at archive.org, gutenberg.org and hathitrust.org.
- Eagar, Margaretta (1906). Six Years at the Russian Court. New York: Bowman via alexanderpalace.org. Also available at archive.org, and openlibrary.org.
- Gilliard, Pierre (1921). Thirteen Years at the Russian Court. London: Hutchinson via alexanderpalace.org. Also available at archive.org, gutenberg.org, openlibrary.org, perlego.com and wikipedia. Translated by F. Appleby Holt.
- King, Greg; Wilson, Penny (2003). The Fate of the Romanovs. Hoboken, New Jersey: John Wiley and Sons, Inc. ISBN 0-471-20768-3.
- Kurth, Peter (1983). Anastasia: The Riddle of Anna Anderson. Boston: Back Bay Books. ISBN 0-316-50717-2.
- Lovell, James Blair (1991). Anastasia: The Lost Princess. Washington, D.C.: Regnery Gateway. ISBN 0-89526-536-2.
- Mager, Hugo (1998). Elizabeth: Grand Duchess of Russia. New York: Carroll and Graf Publishers, Inc. ISBN 0-7867-0678-3.
- Massie, Robert K. (1967). Nicholas and Alexandra. New York: Dell Publishing Co. ISBN 0-440-16358-7.
- Massie, Robert K. (1995). The Romanovs: The Final Chapter. New York: Random House. ISBN 0-394-58048-6.
- Maylunas, Andrei; Mironenko, Sergei (eds), Galy, Darya (translator) (1997). A Lifelong Passion, Nicholas and Alexandra: Their Own Story. New York: Doubleday. ISBN 0-385-48673-1.
- Occleshaw, Michael (1993). The Romanov Conspiracies: The Romanovs and the House of Windsor. London: Orion Publishing Group Ltd. ISBN 1-85592-518-4.
- Rappaport, Helen (2008). The Last Days of the Romanovs. New York: St. Martin's Griffin. ISBN 978-0-312-60347-2.
- Rappaport, Helen (2014). Four Sisters: The Lost Lives of the Romanov Grand Duchesses. Macmillan. ISBN 978-0-230-76817-8.
- Radzinsky, Edvard (1992). The Last Tsar. New York: Doubleday. ISBN 0-385-42371-3.
- Radzinsky, Edvard (2000). The Rasputin File. New York: Doubleday. ISBN 0-385-48909-9.
- Vorres, Ian (1965). The Last Grand Duchess. New York: Scribner. ASIN B0007E0JK0.
- Vyrubova, Anna (1923). Memories of the Russian Court. London: Macmillan via alexanderpalace.org. Also available at gutenberg.org and openlibrary.org. Reprint available at perlego.com.
- Zeepvat, Charlotte (2004). The Camera and the Tsars: A Romanov Family Album. Stroud: Sutton Publishing. ISBN 0-7509-3049-7
