= Martin Tytell =

American typewriter expert

- Born: December 30, 1913
- Died: September 11, 2008 (aged 94)
- Education: New York University Stern School of Business; St. John's University

Martin Kenneth Tytell (December 20, 1913 – September 11, 2008) was an expert in manual typewriters described by The New York Times as having an "unmatched knowledge of typewriters". The postal service would deliver to his store letters addressed simply to "Mr. Typewriter, New York". His customers included many notable authors and reporters, many of whom had clung to their manual typewriters long after personal computers became standard.

Tytell was born on December 20, 1913, to Russian Jewish immigrant parents, and grew up in Manhattan's Lower East Side and in Brooklyn. He became interested in typewriters at age 15 after disassembling an Underwood 5 typewriter on his gym teacher's desk at Thomas Jefferson High School in Brooklyn and watching it being repaired. He had obtained a contract to maintain typewriters for Columbia-Presbyterian Hospital before graduating from high school. He received his bachelor's from St. John's University in Manhattan and earned an MBA from New York University, attending college primarily at night.

Tytell met his wife, Pearl, in 1938, at her office in the Flatiron building. He had gone there to sign a typewriter rental and repair contract. He died in the Bronx of cancer on September 11, 2008, while also suffering from Alzheimer's disease.

== Tytell Typewriter Company ==
The Tytell Typewriter Company opened in 1933 at 123 Fulton Street. In 1941, Tytell created a patented process that allowed him to sell Remington and Underwood Noiseless typewriters that listed for as much as $135 and offer them for sale for $24.95 with a one-year guarantee, and aimed to sell 500 of these typewriters each week. That same year, Tytell developed a coin-operated typewriter that would be available for use in hotel lobbies and train stations for 10 cents per half-hour, modeled on a similar device used in Sweden.

Tytell enlisted in the United States Marine Corps during World War II, and also served in the United States Army with the rank of Sergeant, but was kept out of action due to his flat feet and knowledge of typewriters. In the military he created foreign language typewriters, including French language typewriters for paratroopers who were air-dropped as part of the Invasion of Normandy.

He was in the typewriter repair business for some 70 years, most of which was spent in his Tytell Typewriter Company, located on the second-floor store at 116 Fulton Street from 1963 until 2000. In The Village Voice, he advertised that he offered "Psychoanalysis for Your Typewriter." He worked in a white lab coat, creating custom keyboards for typewriters in 142 different languages and dialects and had 2 million typefaces in stock. He created typewriters that could print hieroglyphics or musical notes and invented models with carriages that operated in reverse for languages such as Arabic and Hebrew that are written right-to-left. An erroneously inverted character he placed on a Burmese language typewriter became the standard in Burma. Customers included David Brinkley, Dorothy Parker and Andy Rooney, as well as both Dwight D. Eisenhower and Adlai E. Stevenson. In 1980, when David Brinkley needed a Great Primer discontinued by Royal a decade earlier, he was able to find two at Tytell. "How many do you want?" was Tytell's response after Brinkley called. Brinkley bought two, what he described as a lifetime supply.

== Forensic analysis ==
Alger Hiss was convicted of perjury in 1950 based on evidence that extensively relied on claims that documents passed to Soviet agent Whittaker Chambers had been created on a typewriter Hiss and his wife had owned, after the prosecution showed that the typewriter's unique combination of printing pattern and flaws matched those on the documents in question. Hiss's lawyers then hired Tytell to create a typewriter that would be indistinguishable from the one the Hiss's owned. Tytell spent two years creating a facsimile Woodstock typewriter whose print characteristics would match the peculiarities of the Hiss typewriter, which was used as one of the primary justifications for an unsuccessful appeal of the verdict in the case.

The senior Tytell retired from the typewriter business in 2000, and his son closed the repair shop in 2001, expanding the 116 Fulton Street space, originally used by both Martin and Pearl Tytell for the forensic study of questioned documents, into his own forensic document research business.

Tytell's son Peter (13 August 1945 - 11 August 2020) was a forensic document examiner, a practice that mother, father and son developed to resolve disputes over the authenticity of handwritten documents, such as forged signatures on checks or wills, and trace anonymous letters and documents, such as typed wills, to their source, using the unique "fingerprint" of each particular typewriter. Peter testified for the prosecution to help gain a conviction in a case that involved documents that were said to connect President John F. Kennedy to Marilyn Monroe and mobster Sam Giancana, and made use of typewriters owned by the Tytell's repair store. His son's expertise was utilized in the investigation of the Killian documents controversy, which involved six documents critical of President George W. Bush's service in the Texas Air National Guard and the use of four of these documents which were presented as authentic in a 60 Minutes Wednesday broadcast aired by CBS on September 8, 2004.

Martin Tytell's daughter, Pamela, earned a Ph.D. from Columbia University in New York City. She lives in Paris, France where she publishes and teaches. Author of numerous articles on psychoanalysis which have appeared in Encyclopaedia Universalis, Magazine Littéraire, etc., her book La Plume sur le Divan: psychanalyse et littérature en France [Paris: Aubier-Montaigne, 1982] was translated into Japanese and Italian. She is Maître de Conférences, a tenured professor in the French University system and also teaches in the elite "Grandes Ecoles".
