= Eugene Botkin =

Court physician for Tsar Nicholas II

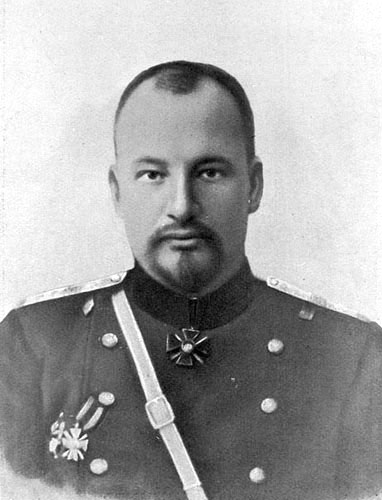
- Eugene Botkin
- Born: Yevgeny Sergeyevich Botkin; 27 March 1865; Saint Petersburg, Russian Empire
- Died: 17 July 1918 (aged 53); Ipatiev House, Yekaterinburg, Russian Soviet Republic
- Cause of death: Execution by firing squad
- Occupation: Physician
- Spouse: Olga Botkina (m. 1891; div. 1910)
- Children: Gleb Botkin; Tatiana Botkina; Dimitri Botkin; Yuri Botkin
- Parents: Sergey Botkin; Anastasia Kryloff
- Relatives: Aleksandra Khokhlova (niece); Mikhail Botkin (uncle); Vasily Botkin (uncle); Boris Jordan (grand nephew)

Saint Eugene Botkin the Physician

Righteous Passion-Bearer
- Venerated in: Russian Orthodox Church
- Canonized: 2016 by the Russian Orthodox Church

Yevgeny Sergeyevich Botkin (Russian: Евгений Сергеевич Боткин; 27 March 1865 – 17 July 1918), commonly known as Eugene Botkin, was the court physician since 1908 for Emperor Nicholas II and Empress Alexandra. He sometimes treated the Tsarevich Alexei Nikolaevich of Russia for haemophilia-related complications, like in Spała in 1912.

Following the Russian Revolution of 1917, Botkin went into exile with the Romanov family, accompanying them to Tobolsk and Yekaterinburg in Siberia. He was murdered with the Imperial family by guards on 17 July 1918.

Like the Romanov family, Botkin was canonised in 1981 as a New Martyr by the Russian Orthodox Church Outside of Russia.

In 2000, the Russian Orthodox Church canonised the Romanov family as passion bearers. On 3 February 2016, the Bishop's Council of the Russian Orthodox Church canonised Botkin as Righteous Passion-Bearer Yevgeny the Physician.

== Early life and career ==
Botkin was born in the Saint Petersburg in the Russian Empire, the fourth son of Anastasia Alexandrovna (Krylova) and Sergey Botkin, who had been a court physician ("Leib Medik") since 1870 under Tsars Alexander II and Alexander III. His father is considered one of the founders of modern Russian medical science and education who introduced triage, pathological anatomy, and post mortem diagnostics into Russian medical practice.

Initially home educated he entered the 5th grade of The Second Saint Petersburg Gymnasium. Botkin followed his father in studying medicine, getting his degree at the S. M. Kirov Military Medical Academy on the properties of blood and doing additional studies at the universities of Berlin and Heidelberg (1890–1892, 1895). He served with distinction aboard the St. Georgievsky Red Cross hospital train and wrote notes on the Russo-Japanese War. In 1907 he was appointed as chief physician at Saint George City Hospital in St. Petersburg.

Botkin married Olga Vladimirovna Manuilova in 1891 and had four children, Dimitri, Yuri, Gleb and Tatiana. His marriage broke up under the strain caused by Botkin's dedication to the Romanovs and his long hours at court. His wife, Olga, started an affair with Friedrich (Fritz) Lichinger, a pharmacist and was granted a divorce.

His oldest son, Dimitri was killed in action during the First World War. Botkin became increasingly religious and "developed an increasing abhorrence for the flesh," according to his son Gleb. His daughter Tatiana wrote his memoirs. Years later, his brother Peter spoke of him:

"From a very tender age, his beautiful and noble nature was complete," his brother Peter recalled later. "He was never like other children. Always sensitive, of a delicate, inner sweetness of extraordinary soul, he had a horror of any kind of struggle or fight. We other boys would fight with fury. He would not take part in our combats, but when our pugilism took on a dangerous character he would stop the combatants at risk of injuring himself. He was very studious and conscientious in his studies. For a profession he chose medicine: to help, to succour, to soothe, to heal without end."^{apud}

== Exile and death ==
Botkin felt it was his duty to accompany the Romanovs into exile, not only because of his responsibility to his patients, the Romanov family, but also to his country. Botkin was considered a friend by Tsar Nicholas II. The doctor also often spoke with Tsarina Alexandra in her native German and acted as a translator for her when she received a Russian delegation.

After Botkin and the family were executed, White Army investigators found this unfinished letter by him. It was written in his quarters on the night of 16 July 1918:

I am making a last attempt at writing a real letter – at least from here – although that qualification, I believe, is utterly superfluous. I do not think that I was fated at any time to write to anyone from anywhere. My voluntary confinement here is restricted less by time than by my earthly existence. In essence, I am dead – dead for my children – dead for my work ... I am dead but not yet buried, or buried alive – whichever, the consequences are nearly identical ... The day before yesterday, as I was calmly reading ... I saw a reduced vision of my son Yuri's face, but dead, in a horizontal position, his eyes closed. Yesterday, at the same reading, I suddenly heard a word that sounded like Papulya. I nearly burst into sobs. Again – this is not a hallucination because the word was pronounced, the voice was similar, and I did not doubt for an instant that my daughter, who was supposed to be in Tobolsk, was talking to me ... I will probably never hear that voice so dear or feel that touch so dear with which my little children so spoiled me ... If faith without works is dead, then deeds can live without faith; and if some of us have deeds and faith together, that is only by the special grace of God. I became one of these lucky ones through a heavy burden-the loss of my firstborn, six-month-old Serzhi... This vindicates my last decision ... when I unhesitatingly orphaned my own children in order to carry out my physician's duty to the end, as Abraham did not hesitate at God's demand to sacrifice his only son.

The letter was interrupted when Yakov Yurovsky, the head of the command at the Ipatiev House knocked on Botkin's door. He ordered the entire Romanov party to dress and come downstairs, on the premise that there was gunfire in the town, and they were to be evacuated. But the entire family and their servants (including Botkin who volunteered) were murdered a short time later.

In the early 1990s, after the unmarked gravesite had been discovered and Botkin's remains were examined, he was found to have had bullet wounds on his legs, pelvis, vertebrae, and forehead.

== Honours and awards ==
- Order of St. Vladimir, 3rd and 2nd classes with swords,
- Order of St. Anna, 2nd class
- Order of St. Stanislaus, 3rd class
- Order of St. Sava, 2nd class
- Bulgarian "For Citizenship Award"
- 1981, canonised by Russian Church Outside of Russia as New Martyr.
- 2016, canonised by the Russian Orthodox Church as passion bearer.

== Representation in other media ==
Botkin features as a character in David Logan's (an Australian playwright) Ekaterinburg. It explores the time in captivity of the Romanovs and their retainers in the Ipatiev House in Ekaterinburg.

Botkin was featured in the 1971 film Nicholas and Alexandra, portrayed by Timothy West; as well as the 1996 television movie Rasputin: Dark Servant of Destiny where he was portrayed by David Warner.

== See also ==
- Romanov sainthood
