= Mellon Tytell =

American photographer

Mellon Tytell is an American photographer. She has been published in National Geographic, Time, Life, People, Stern, GEO, Fortune, Playboy and Photo.

== Published works ==
- The Beat Book Contributed photographs. (Mulch Press, 1974)
- Ecstasy Contributed photographic narrative. (Playboy Press, 1976)
- The Houdini of Photography Article on photographer Weegee (Camera Arts Magazine, 1981)
- Scopophilia, edited by Gerard Malanga Illustrated interview. (Alfred Van Der Marck, 1986)
- Paradise Outlaws John and Mellon Tytell (William Morrow, 1999)
- Rolling Stone Book of the Beats Edited by Holly George-Warren. Contributed essay on Robert Frank, and selection of photographs. (Hyperion, 1999)
- Ginsberg's Farm by Mark McMurray. Contributed photograph. (Caliban Press, 2006)
- Punk 365 Edited by Holly George-Warren. Contributed photograph. (Abrams, 2007)
- My Lucky Dog (HarperCollins, 2008)
