= Bill Morgan (archivist) =

American writer, editor and painter

William Albert Morgan (born 1949) is an American writer, editor and painter, best known for his work as an archivist and bibliographer for public figures such as Allen Ginsberg, Lawrence Ferlinghetti, Abbie Hoffman, and Timothy Leary.

== Biography ==
Morgan was Ginsberg's personal archivist and bibliographer from the early 1980s until the author's death from cancer in 1997. Over their 20-year professional relationship, Morgan became quite close to Ginsberg, and has written extensively on the Beat Generation and its key figures.

Morgan's interest in the Beats goes back to the early 1970s, when he was attending the University of Pittsburgh. For his master's degree thesis, he compiled a bibliography of the works of Lawrence Ferlinghetti, the poet and owner of City Lights Books, the famous San Francisco bookstore. After finishing his thesis, Morgan was encouraged by the editors at the University of Pittsburgh Press to pursue this project with a view toward eventual publication. He continued his research, working in close collaboration with Ferlinghetti as his personal bibliographer, and, after a decade of research, he published Lawrence Ferlinghetti: A Comprehensive Bibliography (New York: Garland Publishing, 1982).

By 1980, Morgan had moved to New York City. While he was still working on the Ferlinghetti book, the poet had referred him to Ginsberg, whose own personal library and archive were invaluable sources of information on the Beats. Early consultations with Ginsberg grew into an enduring relationship that lasted from the early 1980s until Ginsberg's death in 1997. During these years, Morgan was Ginsberg's archivist and bibliographer, helping him to organize and maintain his ever-increasing library and records. As Ginsberg's bibliographer, Morgan spent 15 years corresponding with and visiting numerous publishers, editors, scholars and library collections in order to gather sufficient information to document the history of Ginsberg's prodigious output and the worldwide attention it had drawn. The results of his research appeared in a two-volume bibliography, The Works of Allen Ginsberg, 1941-1994: A Descriptive Bibliography and The Response to Allen Ginsberg, 1926-1994: A Bibliography of Secondary Sources (Westport, Connecticut: Greenwood Press, 1995, 1997). In 2006, Morgan published I Celebrate Myself: The Somewhat Private Life of Allen Ginsberg (New York: Viking, 2006). He followed that in 2010 with The Typewriter Is Holy: The Complete, Uncensored History of the Beat Generation] (New York, NY: Free Press, 2010).

Morgan also wrote or edited six other works relating to the Beats, including collections of Ginsberg's essays (Deliberate Prose: Selected Essays, 1952–1995, New York: HarperCollins, 2000), of the poet's last poems (Death & Fame: Poems, 1993–1997, co-edited with Bob Rosenthal and Peter Hale, New York: HarperFlamingo, 1999) and of Gregory Corso's correspondence (An Accidental Autobiography: The Selected Letters of Gregory Corso, New York: New Directions, 2003). Through City Lights in San Francisco, he has published two guides, The Beat Generation in New York: A Walking Tour of Jack Kerouac's City (1997) and The Beat Generation in San Francisco: A Literary Tour (2003). The latter appeared during the 50th anniversary celebration of City Lights, to which Morgan also contributed with a series of free walking tours of the North Beach section of San Francisco, once a center of bohemian life in the city and home for many of the Beats in the 1950s and 1960s.

In the course of his decades of research on the Beats, Morgan gathered perhaps the largest private collections of printed works by and about Ferlinghetti and Ginsberg in private hands. He found it increasingly difficult to maintain these very large and valuable collections in his New York apartment and reluctantly decided to part with them. Knowing that Ferlinghetti was a University of North Carolina at Chapel Hill alumnus, he decided in fall 2001 to offer his collection of the San Francisco poet to the university libraries. Discussions with library officials led to the transfer of the collection to Chapel Hill in December that year, partly as sale and partly as gift. Pleased with the outcome, Morgan then offered a similar arrangement for his even more extensive Ginsberg collection. The materials were delivered to the Rare Book Collection in Wilson Library in August 2002.

== Major works ==
- The Works of Allen Ginsberg, 1941-1994: A Descriptive Bibliography (Greenwood Press, 1995)
- The Response to Allen Ginsberg, 1926-1994: A Bibliography of Secondary Sources (Greenwood Press, 1996)
- The Beat Generation in New York: A Walking Tour of Jack Kerouac's City (City Lights, 1997)
- The Beat Generation in San Francisco: A Literary Tour (City Lights, 2003)
- Howl on Trial: The Battle for Free Expression - with Nancy J. Peters (City Lights, 2006)
- I Celebrate Myself: The Somewhat Private Life of Allen Ginsberg (New York: Viking, 2006)
- The Letters of Allen Ginsberg (Philadelphia: De Capo, 2008)
- The Typewriter Is Holy: The Complete, Uncensored History of the Beat Generation (New York: Free Press, 2010)
- Beat Atlas: A Guide to the Beat Generation in America (City Lights Publishers, 2011) ISBN 978-0-87286-512-9
- Rub Out the Words : The Letters of William S. Burroughs, 1959-1976 (Panguin, 2012) ISBN 978-1-84614-167-6
- Bennington and the Civil War (History Press, 2013) ISBN 978-1-54022-218-3
- The Civil War Lover’s Guide to New York City (Savas Beatie, 2013) ISBN 978-1-61121-122-1
- I Greet You at the Beginning of a Great Career: The Selected Correspondence of Lawrence Ferlinghetti and Allen Ginsberg, 1955-1997 (City Lights, 2015)
- The Beats Abroad: A Global Guide to the Beat Generation (City Lights Publishers, 2015)
- Thomas Merton, Lawrence Ferlinghetti, And The Protection Of All Beings (St. Andrews: Beatdom, 2022) ISBN 978-0-9934099-9-8
