= Marga Boodts =

Romanov impostor

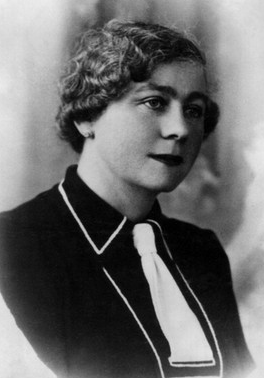
Marga Boodts

Marga Boodts (February 18, 1895 – October 13, 1976) was a woman who claimed to be Grand Duchess Olga Nikolaevna of Russia. She was one of a considerable number of Romanov pretenders who emerged from various parts of the world following the execution of Tsar Nicholas II and his family at Yekaterinberg on July 18, 1918. She stands out, however, as one of very few who claimed to have been Grand Duchess Olga, the Tsar's oldest daughter. She was also known as Maria Bottcher.

== Purported escape from Russia ==
By her own account, Marga Boodts survived the execution at Yekaterinberg when a member of the firing squad, whom she identified only as Dimitri K., knocked her unconscious and pretended that she was dead. Dimitri K., who had been a Cossack soldier, replaced her missing corpse with that of a young woman who had been caught stealing from the bodies of the other members of the Imperial family. He later accompanied her to Vladivostok. Boodts claimed that upon her arrival to Vladivostok she was received by a German elite commando, and from Vladivostok, she reputedly said to have traveled through China and later she was taken by sea to Germany.

== Re-emergence and life in Europe ==
Boodts took her surname from Carlo Boodts, a German officer whom she married in Berlin on May 5, 1926 and divorced two years later. It was also while living in Germany that she claimed to have traveled to Doorn, the Netherlands, and visited Kaiser Wilhelm II (1859–1941), who recognized her as Grand Duchess Olga Nikolaevna. He apparently provided her with financial support for the remainder of his lifetime. She recalled that she had also promised the former Kaiser that she would never reveal her Imperial identity, and would "keep the secret of my survival throughout my life". According to Boodts, the former Kaiser chose the daughter of a friend, Baroness Elisabeth von Schevenbach, to pick her up upon her arrival to Hamburg, and asked her to take care and provide Mrs. Boodts with accommodation. Boodts lived with Frau von Schevenbach for a few years at Potsdam, and later moved to Berlin. She also lived in a state near Stralsund, in eastern Germany.

Boodts' claim gained further credence from 1957, when she was recognised by Prince Sigismund of Prussia (1896–1978), who was a first cousin of the actual Grand Duchess Olga. He, in turn, introduced Boodts to Nikolaus, Hereditary Grand Duke of Oldenburg (1897–1970), a godson of Tsar Nicholas II, who provided her with financial support until his own death in 1970. In 1974, Prince Sigismund remained convinced of Boodts' authenticity. As he told journalists Anthony Summers and Tom Mangold, "we spoke about so many familiar matters that an outsider could not have known about, because they were things that had happened between us two". They maintained correspondence until 1976 when she died. There are 530 letters kept in a private archive in Italy as evidence of that relation. In 1958 Princess Charlotte Agnes of Saxe-Altenburg also visited Marga Boodts, together with her brother Prince Frederick Ernst of Saxe-Altenburg. Prince Sigismund and Princess Charlotte both provided affidavits that the woman living at Lake Como was indeed Grand Duchess Olga Nikolaevna of Russia. During that period, Boodts is also said to have received financial support from Pope Pius XII.

Mother Pascalina Lehnert, governess of Pope Pius XII, declared in 1983 to have witnessed the special meetings between Boodts and the Pope and said that he acknowledged her as the real Grand Duchess Olga of Russia.

Living in Lake Como, Boodts remained in relative obscurity for many years and thus managed to avoid the sensational press coverage (and the suspicion of surviving Romanov descendants) that had long plagued her rival Imperial pretender, the notorious Anna Anderson, who claimed to be the Grand Duchess Anastasia. In 1955 she signed a contract with Mondadori editorial of Italy to publish her memoirs "Io Vivo" (I am alive) as a book. In spite of the contract the book was never published in Italy but in Spain in 2011 by Editorial Martinez Roca becoming a sensational editorial success. Close friends of the Grand Duchess blamed The Vatican for interfering with the publication, due to a legal case pending at the Tribunal of First Instance of the Vatican and the alleged Olga Romanov.

Again in 1960, when Anna Anderson took her case to the Hamburg Courts, Boodts decided to make her own claims public. In an interview with United Press International, Boodts insisted that she had seen "her sister Anastasia" executed at Yekaterinberg, and had now come forward in an effort to discredit the "impostor" in Germany. She further stated that she was considering legal action of her own against Anderson, and was willing to "step into the Hamburg Courts to unmask her". Boodts, at that time was very aware that her benefactor, Prince Sigismund of Prussia, was also a firm supporter of Anderson's claims. Indeed, some of Anderson's strongest opponents (including Lord Mountbatten) cited Prince Sigismund's support of Boodts to discredit him as a witness in the Anderson case. For her own part, Anderson herself once admitted, in a taped interview with journalist Alexis Milukoff, that there was a possibility that Boodts may indeed be her "sister". The two women, however, never met.

By contrast, Boodts is alleged to have met up with a far lesser-known Romanov pretender, Suzanna Catharina de Graaff, who claimed to have been the hitherto unknown fifth child of Tsar Nicholas II and his wife, born after an alleged "hysterical pregnancy" in 1903. Mrs de Graaf's son stated that Boodts not only met his mother but acknowledged her claims, because Boodts herself had been old enough to remember the pregnancy in 1903. Both women exchanged correspondence during ten years. When Mrs. de Graaf's son and his wife subsequently visited Boodts themselves, she reportedly "welcomed them as nephew and niece-in-law".

In 1960, Boodts also revealed to the press that she was currently working on her memoirs in collaboration with a close friend, Gräfin Brigitte von Harrach. Their ambitious project was described as "a 300-page book containing a number of very important documents allegedly proving, without any shadow of doubt, that she really was the first-born daughter of the Czar". This book was published in September 2012 by Martinez Roca Editorial in Spain. It has an extensive introduction by historian and researcher Marie Stravlo, who found the manuscript in Italy in 2010, together with thirty five thousand documents which supposedly prove that the woman known as Marga Boodts was indeed Olga Nikolaevna. The book is available in Spanish.

In 1975, journalists Anthony Summers and Tom Mangold visited Boodts at her Lake Como villa as part of research for their book, The File on the Tsar. She reportedly declined to speak about herself, or past events, and that "nothing at all emerged from the meeting to support the notion that she was either the Grand Duchess Olga, or even a Romanov".

== Death ==
Marga Boodts died of pneumonia on October 13, in a nursing home at Sala Comacina, Como, Italy, at the purported age of 81 years. It is said that the money for her grave had been set aside by her former benefactor, the Hereditary Grand Duke of Oldenburg, who had himself died six years earlier. According to the prologue written by historian and researcher Marie Stravlo in the book "Estoy Viva", following directions of Prince Sigismund of Prussia, her gravestone did not bear the name Marga Boodts but, rather, was inscribed (in German) with text that translated as "In memory of Olga Nikolaevna, 1895-1976, eldest daughter of Emperor Nicholas II of Russia". As there were no direct descendants to pay for its maintenance, the gravestone was destroyed in 1995. In the epilogue of that same book, Marie Stravlo clarifies that Boodts' remains were not placed in a mass grave, as was told in the past. The bones were carefully transferred to another grave, under the supervision and custody of the Italian family that took care of Boodts until she died.

== Legacy ==
Boodts' claim to be the Grand Duchess Olga, which was taken seriously by some people during her lifetime, was disproved thirty years later, when archaeological investigation and scientific testing confirmed that all seven members of the Russian imperial family had been murdered at Yekaterinberg in 1918. This was disputed by the Russian Orthodox Church, which requested new DNA testing, authenticating the original findings.

On August 23, 2007, a Russian archaeologist announced the discovery of two burned, partial skeletons at a bonfire site near Yekaterinburg that appeared to match the site described in Yurovsky's memoirs. The archaeologists said the bones are from a boy who was roughly between the ages of ten and thirteen years at the time of his death and of a young woman who was roughly between the ages of eighteen and twenty-three years old. Anastasia was seventeen years, one month old at the time of the assassination, while her sister Maria was nineteen years, one month old and her brother Alexei was two weeks shy of his fourteenth birthday. Anastasia's elder sisters Olga and Tatiana were twenty-two and twenty-one years old at the time of the assassination. Along with the remains of the two bodies, archaeologists found "shards of a container of sulfuric acid, nails, metal strips from a wooden box, and bullets of various caliber". The bones were found using metal detectors and metal rods as probes.

== See also ==
- Romanov impostors
