= Clothes Make the Woman =

1928 silent drama film by Tom Terriss

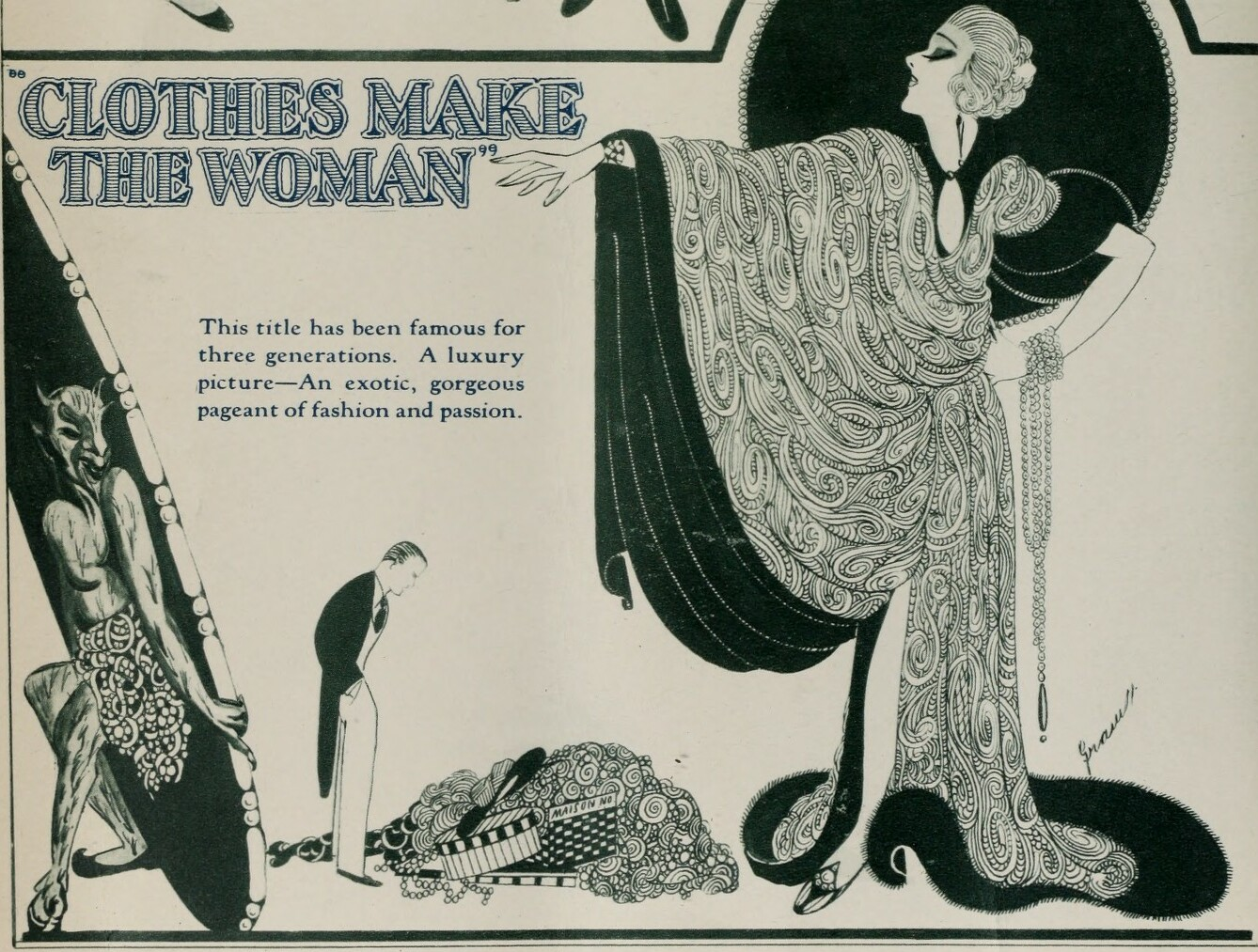
- Directed by: Tom Terriss
- Written by: Tom Terriss (scenario) Leslie Mason (titles)
- Produced by: John M. Stahl
- Starring: Eve Southern; Walter Pidgeon
- Cinematography: Chester A. Lyons
- Edited by: Desmond O'Brien
- Distributed by: Tiffany-Stahl Productions
- Release date: June 4, 1928
- Running time: 60 minutes
- Country: United States
- Languages: Silent; English intertitles

Clothes Make the Woman is a surviving 1928 American silent historical romantic drama film directed by Tom Terriss, and starring Eve Southern and Walter Pidgeon. The film is loosely based on the story of Anna Anderson, a Polish woman who claimed to be Grand Duchess Anastasia Nikolaevna of Russia, the youngest daughter of the last Tsar of Russia, Nicholas II, and his wife, Alexandra Feodorovna. Anastasia was killed along with her parents and siblings by communist Bolshevik revolutionaries on July 17, 1918.

== Plot ==
Grand Duchess Anastasia Nikolaevna of Russia is saved from her family's execution by Victor Trent, a Russian revolutionary. Victor risks his life to help Anastasia flee and the two part ways. Victor later makes his way to Hollywood, and is unaware that Anastasia is also living in the city and attempting to become an actress. By this time, Victor is a popular actor and film producer. He sees Anastasia in a crowd of extras and recognizes her as the young woman he had saved. He promptly casts her in a film about her life and casts himself as her leading man. During a scene reenacting the Romanov execution, Victor accidentally shoots Anastasia but she soon recovers, and then the two are later married.

== Cast ==
- Eve Southern as Anastasia
- Walter Pidgeon as Victor Trent
- Charles Byer as The Director
- George E. Stone as Assistant Director
- Adolph Milar as Bolshevik Leader

== Preservation status ==
- Once thought to be a lost film. This title survives in the Cinematheque Royale de Belgique, Brussels and the BFI National Film and Television archive London.

== See also ==
- Romanov impostors
- Grand Duchess Anastasia Nikolaevna Romanova
