= Eve Southern =

American actress (1900–1962)

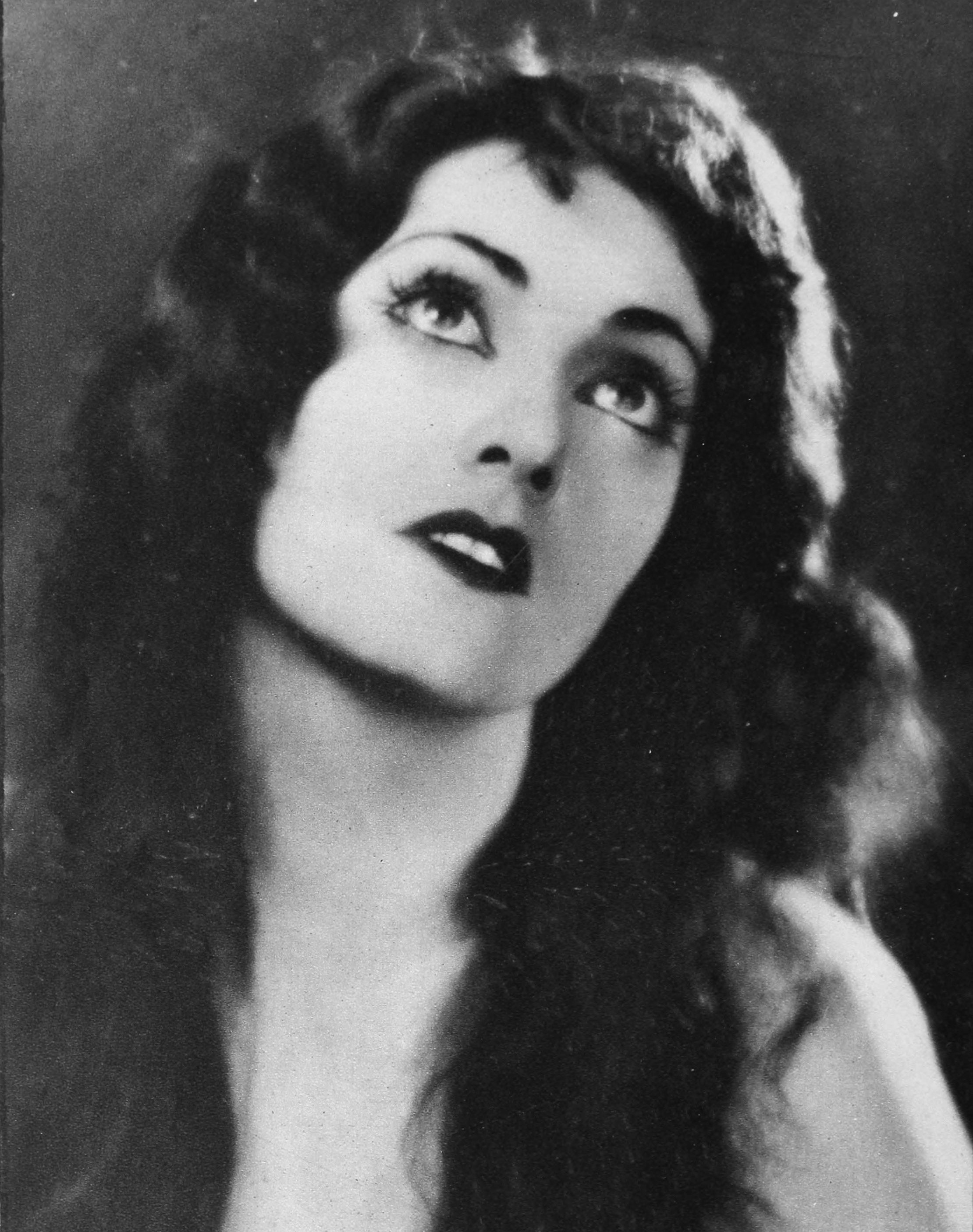
- Southern in Screenland, February 1930
- Born: Elva L. McDowell; August 23, 1900; Ranger, Texas, U.S.
- Died: November 29, 1972 (aged 72); Santa Monica, California, U.S.
- Resting place: Valhalla Memorial Park Cemetery
- Occupation: Actress
- Years active: 1916–1936
- Spouse: Robert F. Shepherd (m. 1925; div. 1928)

Eve Southern (born Elva L. McDowell; August 23, 1900 – November 29, 1972) was an American film actress. She appeared in 38 films from 1916 to 1936. In 1930, she was selected by portrait artist Rolf Armstrong as one of the film industry's 16 "screen beauties".

== Early years ==
Southern studied music in Fort Worth, Texas, with her voice covering three octaves, "the lowest tones of the contralto, as well as the high C of the soprano." However, she was also interested in acting in films.

== Career ==
Southern moved from Fort Worth to Hollywood and began working in films when she was 13 years old, but many of her parts were removed in editing.

In 1924, Southern sang in vaudeville and concert performances. After appearing in several films in the late 1910s and 1920s, she signed a long-term contract to star in films for Tiffany-Stahl. She was first heard on film in Whispering Winds. On April 5, 1929, an automobile hit her car, causing it to turn over. Her hip was broken and her back was wrenched, leaving her badly injured. In July that year, she was reported to have "been in a plaster cast for weeks."

On March 6, 1932, a toboggan accident broke several vertebrae in her back. She had an operation to repair the damage on March 18, 1932. She later appeared in several roles before retiring from film.

== Death ==
Southern died in Santa Monica, California, on November 29, 1972, after a battle with Parkinson's disease. She is interred at Valhalla Memorial Park Cemetery in North Hollywood, California.

== Selected filmography ==
- Intolerance (1916)
- Conscience (1917)
- Broadway Love (1918)
- Greater Than Love (1921)
- After the Show (1921)
- The Rage of Paris (1921)
- The Golden Gallows (1922)
- Nice People (1922)
- The Girl in His Room (1922)
- Souls for Sale (1923)
- Burning Words (1923)
- Trimmed in Scarlet (1923)
- The Chorus Lady (1924)
- The Dangerous Blonde (1924)
- Morals for Men (1925)
- A Woman of the Sea (1926)
- With Love and Hisses (1927)
- Wild Geese (1927)
- The Gaucho (1927)
- Clothes Make the Woman (1928)
- The Naughty Duchess (1928)
- Stormy Waters (1928)
- The Haunted House (1928)
- Whispering Winds (1929)
- Morocco (1930)
- Lilies of the Field (1930)
- Fighting Caravans (1931)
- Law of the Sea (1932)
- The Ghost Walks (1934)
- Stage Frights (1935)
- The King Steps Out (1936)
