= Eleonora Kruger =

Romanov impostor

Eleonora Albertova Krüger (Nora) (Bulgarian: Елеонора Албертова Крюгер; Russian: Элеонора Альбертовна Крюгер; 1901 – 20 July 1954) was a Russian woman who lived in the village of Gabarevo, Bulgaria. According to Blagoy Emanuilov, retired Bulgarian senior magistrate, speculated that she was Grand Duchess Anastasia Nikolaevna of Russia.

== The journey to Bulgaria ==
While conventional history, subsequently confirmed by DNA tests, had all the Tsar's children die with him; there were also many Romanov impostors. The Krüger story was that in 1917, as the Russian Revolution unfolded Emperor Nicholas II of Russia summoned Pyotr Ivanovich Zamyatin, a soldier serving as a cavalry assistant in a squadron guarding the Russian Imperial Family, and in the presence of the Minister of War and a priest he instructed the soldier to take Grand Duchess Anastasia and Tsarevich Alexei into hiding while the two Imperial children were replaced by doppelgangers. Originally they were taken to Zamyatin's home village in the area around Odessa, however, as the revolution was not subsiding a decision was taken to leave Russia. On 7 February 1920 with the assistance of a Serbian man they all boarded a ship from Odessa to Alexandria, Egypt. While boarding the ship a scuffle occurred that was accompanied by shooting on the pier and Anastasia was wounded. Holding a dog in front of her was the reason why the wounds were not fatal. This prevented them from reaching their final destination and they left the ship in Tekirdağ, Turkey to seek treatment.

In Tekirdağ, Zamyatin found work in a hospital while Nora was being treated for her wounds. Once she had improved, Nora and George found worked in the hospital kitchen. With an assistance of a second Serbian, pharmacist, the first one and Zamyatin's sister eloped to Belgrade. In 1922, Pyotr met the second Serbians yet again and was told the location of his sister and her new family, they had opened a coffee shop in Belgrade called "Zamyatin". Pyotr, Nora and George decided to join them in Serbia. Nora cut off her hair in order to pass as a soldier while crossing the borders. However, in Sofia George was admitted into a hospital as he was in need of medical care. In the hospital they met a wealthy man from Kazanlak who helped them settle in Gabarevo.

== Life in Bulgaria ==
Krüger arrived in the village of Gabarevo in the summer of 1922, where a small community of Russian immigrants had already settled in. Eleonora Kruger was welcomed by Doctor Peter Alexandrovich Alexiev in his house. According to his information that he provided when he first came to Gabarevo Dr. Alexiev was born on 15 January 1884 in Smolensk, Russia. When Eleonora first came to the village she was registered as a Russian; she subsequently changed her nationality to Polish. She would tell the people that she was the daughter of a Russian nobleman and Polish countess. Their names are registered as Albert and Maria Kruger, however, she would never reveal anything from their backgrounds.

The living arrangements between Dr. Alexiev and Nora made the people of Gabarevo uneasy. Rumors began to spread; eventually this would force Dr. Alexiev and Nora to marry. The marriage took place on 26 September 1924 – at the time of the marriage he was 40 and she was 25. In the marriage documents Peter was identified as a bachelor and Nora as a widow. She would tell people that she had a daughter named Maria who was born in 1919 and who died shortly after.

=== Eleonora's character ===
Nora Krueger was a teacher of French, English and Latin, and also did the props for the amateur local theater productions. She is said to have offered her services as prompter; however, the bullet had affected her vocal cords, and she kept her voice low and spoke mainly through the nose. To many of her students she would hint at various things: that she had lived in a royal palace, bathed in a golden tub, maids dressed her, brushed her hair and cut her nails.

She made a painting of flowers, presented by her to Stefanka Nestorova, which was interpreted by people obsessed with her mystery: The poppy would represent Maria, the oats, Olga, the gentian, Tatyana, the scilla ("vasilyok") would represent the Tsarevich, and finally chamomile ("romashka") would represent the Romanovs.

Nora loved and had many dogs; one of her dogs was named "Maron", which is a very unusual name for Bulgaria. The name is also an anagram for "Roman", short for Romanov. More simply, the meaning of "marron" in French is "brown", which is not unusual for the dog of a French teacher. The names of her other dogs were Rex, Tangra, Beba, Jimmy and Johnny.

Nora was a smoker and used opium. Nora would tell that she picked up this habit from an aunt of hers. On the other hand, Dr. Alexiev would justify it by stating that the opium relieved the pain from her bullet wounds. Nora was unable to sleep in a completely horizontal position and was sleeping in a reclining position.

In 1936 Nora traveled to Germany and lived in Berlin for a year.

=== George Zhudin ===
Dr. Alexiev and Eleonora Kruger were soon joined by a young Russian named George Pavlovich Zhudin, who ended up living in the same house as Dr. Alexiev and Eleonora. George was described as a tall and slim man with a pale face, and it was told that George was sick with tuberculosis – the symptoms for tuberculosis and hemophilia can be similar (Anastasia's younger brother, Alexei, suffered from hemophilia). Dr. Alexiev would tell that George is not contagious. It was widely speculated that Nora and George were sister and brother, although they themselves never confirmed this.

George died on 27 December 1930, and was buried in the village of Gabarevo. In his death certificate his parents are listed as Paul Stefanov and Alexandra Sergeevna. Under subject and nationality, George is listed as Russian. Nora would often visit his grave and is said to have planted two trees there. After her death, she was buried on his right side, a tradition for Russian people related by blood. Additionally, when their graves were excavated in the 1990s, a ladanka was found in George's grave – a small icon of Christ customarily left inside the graves of high-profile Russian aristocrats.

=== The other Russians ===
The other Russians who comprised the small community living in Gabarevo were registered at the city hall as Matvei Pavlovich Kolishev, Sergei Maximovich Kuzmich, and Iakov Simeonovich Latvinov. The other Russians were employed by Dr. Alexiev and Eleonora Kruger, and cooked and cleaned their house.

Around 1928, Constantine Pavlovich Zhudin, another Russian, joined the circle around Nora. Constantine Zhudin was stranded in Istanbul, Turkey and unable to leave. Dr. Alexiev had requested from one of his neighbors in Gabarevo a favor. This favor consisted of the elderly man getting a certificate from the local municipality certifying that he was in advanced age and was in need of a male support in maintaining his agricultural work. This certificate accomplished its purpose and Constantine Zhudin moved to Bulgaria. He initially settled in Gabarevo; however, later he relocated to Sofia and worked at the French Embassy in Bulgaria.

Neither Eleonora nor Georgi ever actually claimed to be Russian royalty. However, they both seemed to have an uncanny resemblance to Anastasia and Alexei.

== See also ==
- Romanov impostors
