= Anatoly Ionov (Romanov claimant) =

Russian man (born 1936)

Anatoly Ionov (born 1936) is a Russian man who claims to be the son of Grand Duchess Anastasia Nikolaevna of Russia.

== Claim ==
The Imperial Russian family was killed by Bolsheviks on July 17, 1918. Ionov claims that Anastasia and her brother Tsarevich Alexei Nikolaevich of Russia were rescued and hidden by loyalists to the monarchy in the Russian Urals. Alexei soon died, but the loyalists brought Anastasia to ataman Alexander Dutov, a monarchist. Dutov could not take Anastasia with him when he retreated to Siberia because of her weakened physical condition.

Instead, Ionov claims Anastasia was turned over to Ksenia Karetnikova, the wife of the People's Commisar Semen Budenny. Karetnikova supposedly sent Anastasia to her parents, who claimed she was their daughter Anastasia Yakovlevna Karetnikova. Anastasia then married a man named Vladimir Ionov and had two children, Anatoly and his sister Alexandra. Ionov claims that Anastasia was murdered in August 1936 and her death covered up as a suicide caused by post-partum depression. Ionov claims that he is the rightful crown prince. He has sent letters (which went unanswered) to Vladimir Putin demanding that his mother and sister be buried in the tsar's burial vault. He also requested that their DNA be compared against that of the remains of the Tsar's family found at Ekaterinburg. This request has also gone unanswered.

In 1991–2007, the remains of Grand Duchess Anastasia and all of her family were discovered and identified by DNA testing, disproving his story.

== See also ==
- Romanov impostors
