= Michelle Anches =

Romanov impostor

Michelle Anches was a woman who claimed to be the Grand Duchess Tatiana Nikolaevna of Russia.

Michelle made plans to travel to see her purported grandmother, the Dowager Empress of Russia, but she was killed in her house under very mysterious circumstances before being able to travel and do so.

The remains of all members of the Romanov family killed at Ekaterinburg in 1918, including Grand Duchess Tatiana, have been discovered and identified through DNA testing, confirming Anches was an imposter.

== See also ==
- Romanov impostors
