= Maddess Aiort =

Romanov impostor

Maddess Aiort (died 1982) was a woman who claimed to be Grand Duchess Tatiana Nikolaevna of Russia, the second daughter of Nicholas II of Russia. She died in 1982 of a serious disease still unknown.

== Biography ==
The remains of the members of the Romanov family killed at Ekaterinburg in 1918, including those of Grand Duchess Tatiana, have been identified through DNA testing.

Very little is known about this impostor. She appeared in Canada in 1937 and immediately publicly declared herself "Grand Duchess Tatyana Nikolaevna." Explanations of how she managed to avoid the Yekaterinburg execution were never given.

Ayort's statement was never taken seriously by anyone, the applicant was ridiculed, in 1942 (or 1943) accused of “sympathizing with the enemy” and forced to leave the country.

She later lived in Spain, where she died in 1982 from an unknown disease.

== See also ==
- Romanov impostors
