= Natalya Bilikhodze =

Romanov impostor (1900–2000)

Natalya Petrovna Bilikhodze (Russian: Наталья Петровна Билиходзе; 1900–2000) was a Romanov impostor, one of several women to falsely claim that she was Grand Duchess Anastasia Nikolaevna of Russia, who was executed with her family by Bolsheviks at Yekaterinburg, Russia on 17 July 1918.

Bilikhodze's claim was presented at a press conference in Moscow in June 2002. Bilikhodze claimed that Anastasia was not shot, but fled to Georgia, where she later married. Bilikhodze had begun using the name Grand Duchess Anastasia in 1995. The video of Bilikhodze bringing forward these claims was shown on Russian television in June 2002. It was later revealed that the video had been made two years before that, and Bilikhodze herself had died in Podolsk and been dead since 2000. In January 2001, a commission of experts at the Central Clinical Hospital studied tissues from Bilikhodze's body and concluded that she was not related to the Romanovs.

== See also ==
- Romanov impostors
