= Granny Alina =

Romanov impostor

- Born: Alina Matshievska
- Died: December 12, 1969
- Partner(s): Frank Antonowitz (husband); Harry Karadimas (lover) Jacob Coenrad Breytenbach (husband)
- Relatives: Gabriel Louis Duval (foster grandson)

Alina Matshievska (also known as Granny Alina; died 12 December 1969) was the foster grandmother of Gabriel Louis Duval, who claimed in his 2004 book A Princess in the Family that she might have been Grand Duchess Anastasia Nikolaevna of Russia. (however photos of Granny Alina depict her looking like an older version of Grand Duchess Maria Nikolaevna of Russia.)

According to Duval, Granny Alina married a man named Frank Antonowitz (an Anglicised version of his birth name, Francisus Antonievitsk) on 16 February 1914 in Durban, Natal, South Africa, where they started a farrier business together. After Antonowitz's death, she began a relationship with a Greek man named Harry Karadimas, with whom she shared a home. She lived with Duval's family from 1954 until her death. There are also records of her marrying Jacob Coenrad Breytenbach on 6 August 1957 in Empangeni, Natal, South Africa.

Alina died on 12 December 1969 in Pietermaritzburg, in a Greys Hospital, at the age of 75. The record of her death lists her marital status as married, and uses her married name of Alina Breytenbach. The cause of her death is listed as a myocardial infarction from complications of diabetes.

In his book, Duval claimed that Granny Alina told him she was a princess, that her family had been murdered during the Russian Revolution, and that she had been rescued. She did not want to talk about the rescue for fear of being sent back to Russia. Duval had her grave exhumed, but her remains were too decomposed to produce an accurate DNA profile. The story attracted some television news coverage in Australia and in the United States.

Alina had two children, Antony (1914–1921) and John (1917–1974) to Antonowitz. Antonowitz was born in 1864 so was 31 years older than Alina when they married. Antony was born four months after they were married and a judge ordered their marriage.

== See also ==
- Romanov impostors
