= Romanov impostors =

Claimants to the Russian imperial Romanov family

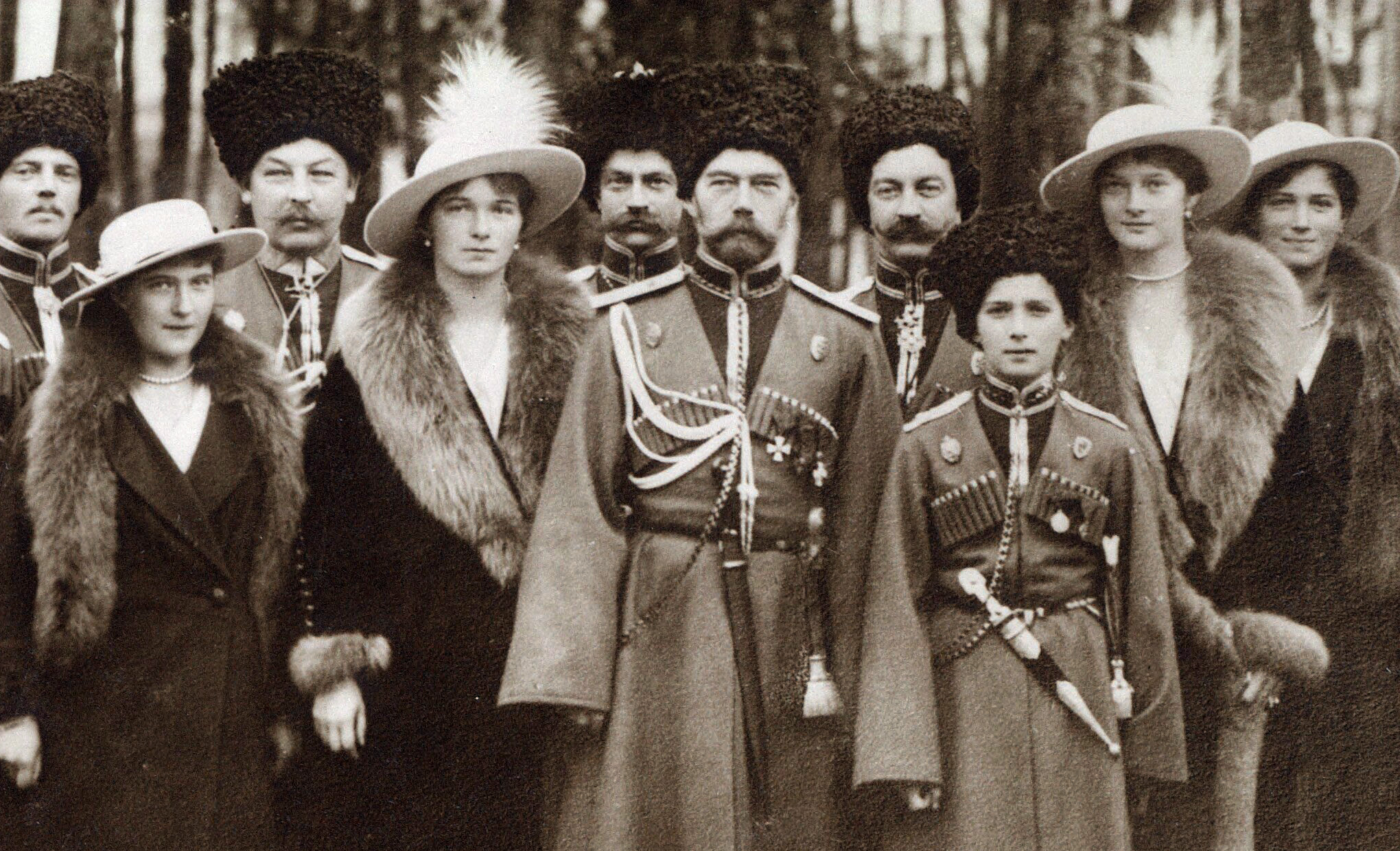
From left to right, Grand Duchesses Anastasia and Olga; Tsar Nicholas II, Tsarevich Alexei, Grand Duchesses Tatiana and Maria with Cossacks in 1916. Courtesy of Beinecke Library.

Members of the ruling Romanov dynasty— including Tsar Nicholas II, his wife Alexandra, and his children Olga, Tatiana, Maria, Anastasia, and Alexei— were executed by a firing squad led by Yakov Yurovsky in Yekaterinburg, Russia, on 17 July 1918, during the Russian Civil War. Afterwards, a number of people came forward claiming to be Romanovs that survived the execution. All were impostors, as the skeletal remains of the Imperial family have since been recovered and identified through DNA testing. To this day, a number of people still falsely claim to be members of the Romanov family, often using false titles of nobility or royalty.

== DNA testing ==
In 1991, nine sets of human remains were found in the forest outside Yekaterinburg. They have been identified through DNA testing as belonging to the Tsar and Tsarina, three of their daughters, the Tsarina's ladies' maid, and the family's doctor, cook and footman. In 1998, the Romanovs and their servants were buried in St. Petersburg and have been declared passion bearers by the Russian Orthodox Church. However, two sets of remains were missing from the mass grave. Scientists identified the missing family members as Tsarevich Alexei Nikolaevich of Russia, who was a few weeks short of his fourteenth birthday at the time of the killing, and either Grand Duchess Anastasia Nikolaevna of Russia or Grand Duchess Maria Nikolaevna of Russia, who were seventeen and nineteen respectively at the time of the killings. The report of two missing bodies continued until the late 2000s to fuel speculation that one or more members of the family could have survived.

On 23 August 2007 a Russian archaeologist announced the discovery of two burned, partial skeletons at a bonfire site near Yekaterinburg that appeared to match the site described in Yurovsky's memoirs. The archaeologists said the bones are from a boy who was roughly between the ages of ten and thirteen years at the time of his death and of a young woman who was roughly between the ages of eighteen and twenty-three years old. Along with the remains of the two bodies, archaeologists found "shards of a container of sulfuric acid, nails, metal strips from a wooden box, and bullets of various caliber." The bones were found using metal detectors and metal rods as probes.

On 22 January 2008 Russian forensic scientists announced that preliminary testing indicated a "high degree of probability" that the remains belong to the Tsarevich Alexei and to one of his sisters. The Yekaterinburg region's chief forensic expert Nikolai Nevolin indicated the results would be compared against those obtained by foreign experts and a final report could be issued by April or May 2008. On 30 April 2008 Russian forensic scientists announced that DNA testing proved that the remains belong to the Tsarevich Alexei and to one of his sisters. With this result, all of the Tsar's family are accounted for, proving that none of them survived the execution. As of 2018 the Russian Orthodox Church has not yet recognized these remains as belonging to the imperial family; the House of Romanov has expressed openness to the possibility of having the remains exhumed for further analysis and confirmation of their identity.

Anastasia's legendary survival accounts have consistently generated widespread interest, inspiring numerous literary and cinematic works.

== Anastasia impostors ==
Some of the women who claimed or were believed to be the Grand Duchess Anastasia Nikolaevna of Russia are:

- Anna Anderson, real name Franziska Schanzkowska, was, by far, the most famous impostor. She appeared in 1920 in Berlin, Germany, and died in Charlottesville, Virginia, United States in 1984;
- Eugenia Smith, aka Eugenia Drabek Smetisko, appeared in Chicago, United States in 1963, had a book published titled Autobiography of HIH Anastasia Nicholaevna of Russia that year, and died in Rhode Island in 1997.
- Eleonora Kruger, lived with Alexei impostor George Zhudin and died in a Bulgarian village in 1954.
- Natalya Bilikhodze, appeared in 1995 and went to Russia in 2000 to "claim the Romanov fortune."
- Nadezhda Vasilyeva, appeared in the 1920s in Russia and died there in a Kazan psychiatric ward in 1971.

Some individuals have come forward claiming direct descent from Anastasia:

- Anatoly Ionov claims to be Anastasia's son.
- Caty Petersen is a Filipina woman who claims that her grandmother was Grand Duchess Anastasia. Her grandmother was named Tasia and claimed to have arrived in Manila in 1919, and to have had siblings named Maria and Alexei. She also said that they had to hide from Soviet Russia or else they would be "kill[ed]".

== Alexei impostors ==
Several men claimed to be Tsarevich Alexei Nikolaevich of Russia, including:

- Vasily Filatov, whose claim came from Astrakhan, Russia, shortly before his death in 1988.
- Eugene Nicolaievich Ivanoff, whose claim emerged from Poland in 1927.
- George Zhudin (?–1930), lived with Eleonora Kruger and died in a Bulgarian village;
- Alexander Savin, who was arrested by the OGPU (Russian Secret Police) in 1928
- Heino Tammet, who died in 1977 in Vancouver, British Columbia, Canada.
- Michael Goleniewski, a CIA agent who in 1959 claimed to be the Tsarevich.
- Author, Michael Gray, (an alias adopted by a Northern Irish teacher) claimed in his book Blood Relative that the Tsarevich escaped with the Dowager Empress aboard the warship HMS Marlborough in 1919 and later assumed the name Nikolai Chebotarev. In the book, Gray claims he is the son of the Tsarevich and Princess Marina, Duchess of Kent, and they had secretly married in the late 1940s.

== Olga, Tatiana, and Maria impostors ==
- Marga Boodts claimed to have been Grand Duchess Olga Nikolaevna of Russia.
- Granny Alina claimed to have been Grand Duchess Maria Nikolaevna of Russia.
- Larissa Tudor was claimed to have been Grand Duchess Tatiana Nikolaevna
- Alexis Brimeyer claimed his grandmother, Ceclava Czapska, was Grand Duchess Maria Nikolaevna of Russia.
- Maddess Aiort claimed to have been the Grand Duchess Tatiana Nikolaevna of Russia.
- Michelle Anches claimed to have been the Grand Duchess Tatiana Nikolaevna of Russia.

== Other impostors ==
- Achmed Abdullah - claimed descent from Grand Duke Nicholas Romanoff, a supposed cousin of the Czar
- Suzanna Catharina de Graaff was a Dutch woman who claimed to be the fifth daughter of Nicholas II and Alexandra, born in 1903 when Alexandra was reported to have had a false pregnancy (pseudocyesis). There are no official or private records of Alexandra giving birth to any child at this time.
- Michael Romanoff, actually a Lithuanian-born eccentric named Harry F. Gerguson, claimed for decades before his death in 1971 that he was the nephew of the last Tsar. Though his story and assumed name were discredited quickly, he continued to be a minor celebrity in Hollywood, where he operated the highly popular Romanoff's Restaurant.
