= Nadezhda Vasilyeva =

Romanov impostor

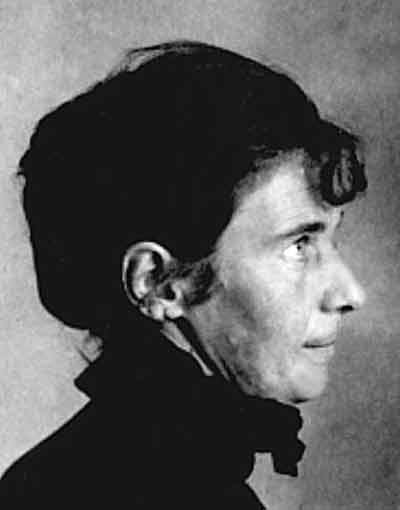
Nadezhda Ivanovna Vasilyeva in 1934

Nadezhda Ivanova-Vasilyeva (? – 1971; Cyrillic: Надежда Владимировна Иванова-Васильева) was one of several women who claimed to be Grand Duchess Anastasia Nikolaevna of Russia. Vasilyeva first surfaced in Siberia in 1920, as she was trying to travel to China. She was arrested by the Bolshevik authorities and was imprisoned in succession at Nizhny Novgorod, Moscow, Leningrad, and an island gulag in the White Sea. In 1934 she was moved to a prison hospital in Kazan. She wrote letters in French and German to King George V of the United Kingdom asking him to help his "cousin" Anastasia. At one point she changed her story and said she was the daughter of a merchant from Riga. Later, she again claimed to be Anastasia. She died in an insane asylum in 1971. According to the head of the hospital in Kazan, "except for her claim that she was Anastasia, she was completely sane."

== See also ==
- Romanov impostors
