= Whispering Winds (film) =

1929 film

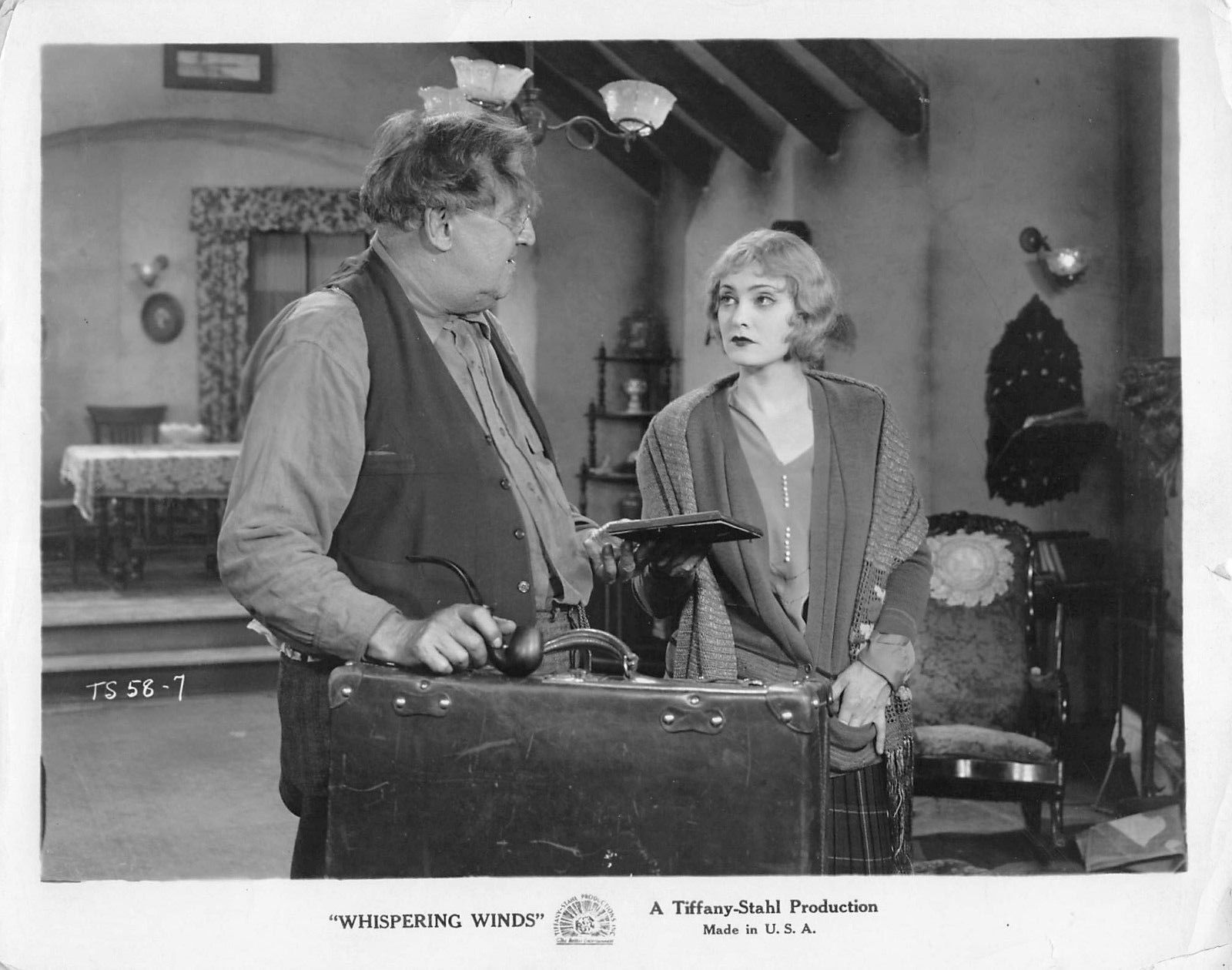
- Directed by: James Flood
- Written by: Jean Plannette; Charles Logue
- Produced by: John M. Stahl
- Starring: Patsy Ruth Miller; Malcolm McGregor; Eve Southern
- Cinematography: Harry Jackson; Jack MacKenzie
- Edited by: James B. Morley
- Music by: Erno Rapee
- Production company: Tiffany Pictures
- Distributed by: Tiffany Pictures
- Release date: September 5, 1929
- Running time: 65 minutes
- Country: United States
- Languages: Sound (Part-Talkie); English Intertitles

Whispering Winds is a 1929 American sound part-talkie pre-Code drama film directed by James Flood and starring Patsy Ruth Miller, Malcolm McGregor and Eve Southern. In addition to sequences with audible dialogue or talking sequences, the film features a synchronized musical score and sound effects along with English intertitles. The soundtrack was recorded using the Tiffany-Tone sound-on-film system using RCA Photophone equipment.

== Cast ==
- Patsy Ruth Miller as Dora
- Malcolm McGregor as Jim
- Eve Southern as Eve Benton
- Eugenie Besserer as Jim's Mother
- James A. Marcus as Pappy
- Claire McDowell as Mrs. Benton

== Music ==
The film features a theme song entitled "Whenever I Think of You" with music by H.J. Tandler and lyrics by Harry D. Kerr. Also featured on the soundtrack is a song entitled "Listen To The Rain" with music by H.J. Tandler and lyrics by Harry D. Kerr.

== See also ==
- List of early sound feature films (1926–1929)

== Bibliography ==
- Pitts, Michael R. Poverty Row Studios, 1929–1940: An Illustrated History of 55 Independent Film Companies, with a Filmography for Each. McFarland & Company, 2005.
