= Eugene Nicolaievich Ivanoff =

Romanov imposter

Eugene Nicolaievich Ivanoff of Poland, who claimed to be Tsarevich Alexei Romanov in the mid-1920s, was one of the first in a long line of Romanov impostors to emerge from various parts of the world following the execution of Tsar Nicholas II and his family at Yekaterinburg on 17 July 1918. He was both one of the first Alexei claimants, and one of the first Romanov claimants to generate any sort of serious publicity in the European and American press.

== Overview ==
Ivanoff's claim was first documented in 1927 in the Warsaw newspaper Express Poranny and the article was subsequently adapted for publication in the French journal Le Matin by Henry de Korab. In his version, Korab reported that he had heard rumours that "Grand Duke Alexis" (sic) was living as a refugee in Poland, either somewhere in Pomerelia or on the outskirts of Bydgoszcz. He noted: "there is on the subject a little conspiracy of silence; the persons knowledgeable about the matter have, no doubt, interest in being silent and only answer you by monosyllables".

By his own account, Ivanoff fled the Yekaterinberg massacre in the company of "an old Cossack" and, passing through Siberia, arrived at a German internment camp and, with his knowledge of the German language, succeeded in gaining access. He was repatriated to Magdeburg but then, in 1919, travelled back to Poland because, as he put it, "wanting to be nearer to Russia, for I was expecting changes in my country". After arriving in Pomerelia, Ivanoff spent two years in the protection of Abbott Biernaz, parish priest of Chelmo, who was quoted as stating that the young man "is indeed the most authentic of the Czarevichs that he has, for several years, sheltered under his roof". The Abbott further noted that Ivanoff spoke perfect English, German and French, and that "he was knowledgeable of the lesser details of the court of Russia". He also appeared to suffer from haemophilia, just like the real Tsarevich Alexei.

At the time that the article was published, Ivanoff was reported to be living in Bydogoszcz as the guest of a Russian emigre family named Zuruk. It was noted that "he sews and embroiders: feminine craftsmanship that the authentic Czarevitch has picked up as a habit during his long illnesses". On Sundays, Ivanoff also liked to dress up in the uniform of the former Russian Imperial Army. A photograph of the claimant in uniform, which accompanied the original article, is reproduced in Guy Richard's 1970 book, The Hunt for the Czar.

Ivanoff's claim was subsequently reported in several North American newspapers, including the New York Times, the Schenectady Gazette (New Jersey) and the Victoria Daily Advocate (Texas).

After his initial flurry of international publicity, Ivanoff seems to have disappeared from the public record, and his subsequent fate remains unknown.
