= Stormy Waters (1928 film) =

1928 film

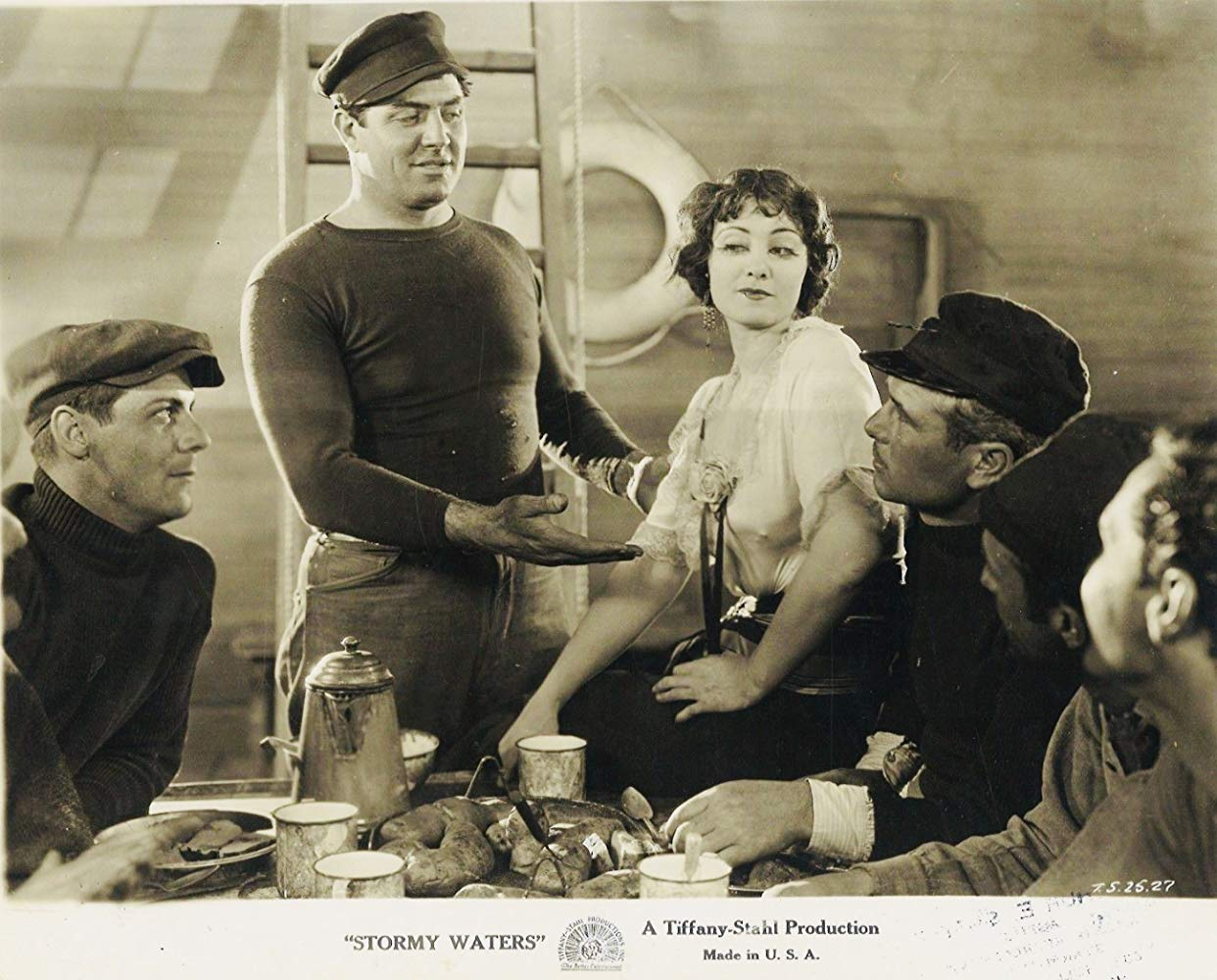
- Film still from the production
- Directed by: Edgar Lewis
- Written by: Jack London (story); Harry Dittmar; Leslie Mason
- Produced by: John M. Stahl
- Starring: Eve Southern; Malcolm McGregor; Roy Stewart
- Cinematography: Ernest Miller
- Edited by: Martin G. Cohn
- Production company: Tiffany Pictures
- Distributed by: Tiffany Pictures
- Release date: June 1, 1928
- Running time: 60 minutes
- Country: United States
- Languages: Silent; English intertitles

Stormy Waters is a 1928 American silent drama film directed by Edgar Lewis and starring Eve Southern, Malcolm McGregor and Roy Stewart. It is based on the story Yellow Handkerchief by Jack London.

== Cast ==
- Eve Southern as Lola
- Malcolm McGregor as Davis Steele
- Roy Stewart as Captain Angus Steele
- Shirley Palmer as Mary
- Olin Francis as Bos'n
- Norbert A. Myles as 1st Mate
- Bert Appling as 2nd Mate

== Bibliography ==
- Goble, Alan. The Complete Index to Literary Sources in Film. Walter de Gruyter, 1999.
