= Suzanna Catharina de Graaff =

Romanov impostor

Suzanna Catharina de Graaff (born Suzanna Catharina Hemmes; 5 May 1905, in Rotterdam – 25 November 1968), was a Dutch woman who claimed to be a fifth daughter of Tsar Nicholas II and Tsarina Alexandra. Her claim was accepted by Anna Anderson, who claimed to be Grand Duchess Anastasia Nikolaevna of Russia, but by few others. The Russian Imperial family was killed by Bolsheviks in Ekaterinburg, Russia, on July 17, 1918. After the reported murders, a number of people claimed to be surviving members of the family.

== Early life ==
De Graaff was the daughter of Lena Kroon and Leendert Johannes Hemmes, a man who claimed to be able to use his psychic powers to diagnose sickness from the urine of people with illnesses. De Graaff married twice and had one child from her marriage to Antoon Weelden, whom she divorced, and twin daughters from her marriage to Jan Barend de Graaff.

== The story ==
De Graaff, who later called herself "Princess Alexandra," claimed that she had actually been born in 1903, the year that Tsarina Alexandra experienced either a "hysterical pregnancy" or a miscarriage. According to letters and diary entries by the family that were later published, Alexandra did not give birth to a child in 1903. However, de Graaff claimed that because Nicholas and Alexandra already had four daughters and there was pressure upon them to produce a male heir to the throne, they decided to place their supposed fifth daughter with adoptive parents. Philippe Vachot, a doctor and "holy man" at the Imperial court from Lyon, France, supposedly arranged for the baby to go to Hemmes. De Graaff's claims are seen as plausible by some because Vachot was supposedly hired by the Romanovs at a time when they were desperate for a male heir, pursuant to his claims to be able to influence the sex of children at an early stage of pregnancy. Accordingly, when the fifth girl, later to become de Graaff, was supposedly born on September 1, 1903, Vachot had motive to secrete the child away and claim that the Tsarina had not in fact been pregnant. Her pregnancy had been previously reported in the European press.

In 1905, several months after the August 1904 birth of Tsarevich Alexei Nikolaevich of Russia, Vachot returned to France a rich man, having been generously compensated by the Romanovs.

De Graaff told the Daily Telegraph in October 1968 that Hemmes told her the truth about her origins in 1937. At that time she received her dowry from the Romanovs: five million rubles, a cloth belonging to the crown jewels, china and "trinkets." Hemmes supposedly told her that he had received "hush money" from the Romanovs to stay quiet about his daughter's true origins. A side note to the story is that Hemmes, who came from a poor family and was himself impoverished, was able in 1919 to build a luxurious home for his family in Rotterdam, which he later lost through incompetent business dealings. Moreover, Suzanna de Graaff left the paper rubles she claimed to have received as a dowry to her three children, one of whom, Anton van Weelden (de Graaff was married twice, producing van Weelden from the first marriage and twin daughters from the second), showed his portion to reporter James Lovell in 1989. Lovell reported in his book "Anastasia: The Lost Princess" (St. Martin's Press, 1991) that the pre-revolutionary rubles shown to him by van Weelden had apparently never been circulated; they were new, still crisp and in numerically sequential order.

Anderson told the Daily Telegraph that she accepted De Graaff as her sister. The two women first met in Germany in about 1950 and exchanged letters. De Graaff's sister Adriana Hemmes rejected de Graaff's claim to be a fifth daughter of Nicholas and Alexandra as completely false and was estranged from de Graaff in their later years. De Graaff died of a heart attack in November 1968.

De Graaff never tried to capitalize on her claims, and in fact made them public only weeks before her death.

== See also ==
- Romanov impostors
