= Bob Massie (activist) =

American activist (born 1956)

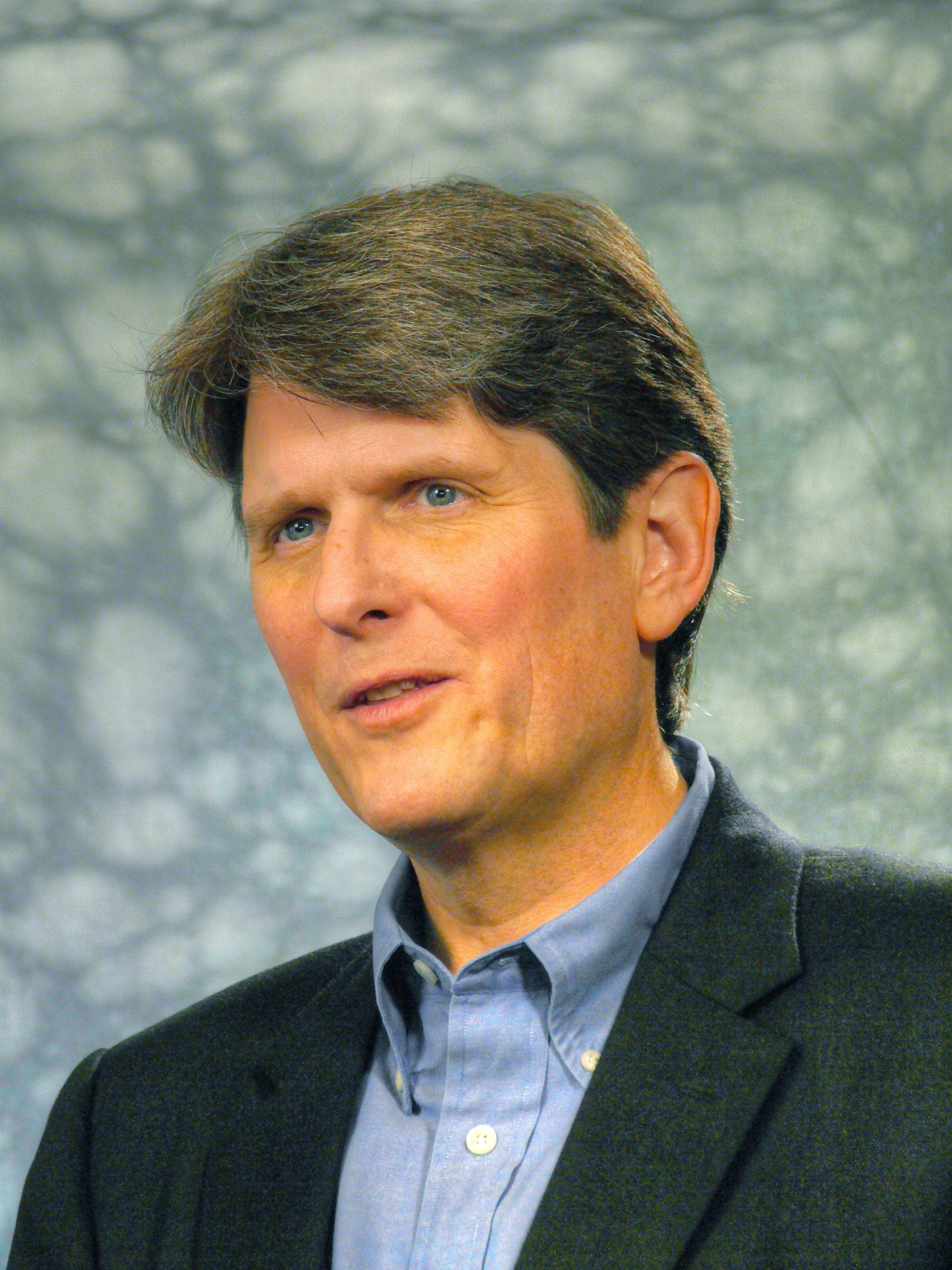
- Bob Massie, 2011
- Born: Robert Kinloch Massie IV; August 17, 1956 (age 70); New York City, New York, U.S.
- Education: Princeton University (BA); Yale University (MDiv); Harvard University (DBA)
- Known for: Ceres executive director; Global Reporting Initiative co-founder
- Political party: Democratic
- Spouses: Dana L. Robert (m. 1980; div. 1995); Anne Tate (m. 1997)
- Children: 3
- Parent(s): Robert K. Massie (father); Suzanne Massie (mother)

Robert Kinloch "Bob" Massie IV (born August 17, 1956) is an American activist, author, clergyman and early pioneer in the fields of corporate accountability, finance, sustainability, and climate change. He has created or led several organizations, including Ceres, the Global Reporting Initiative, the Investor Network on Climate Risk, the New Economy Coalition and the Sustainable Solutions Lab. His early activism centered on opposition to South Africa's apartheid regime, writing about the relationship between the U.S. and South Africa in the apartheid era.

== Early life and education ==
Born in New York City, Massie is the son of historians Robert K. Massie, winner of the 1981 Pulitzer Prize for biography; and Suzanne Massie, who worked in forming the relationship between Ronald Reagan and Mikhail Gorbachev.

Massie was born with severe classical hemophilia, also known as "Factor VIII hemophilia", a genetic disease that prevents the blood from clotting. Though many associate hemophilia with uncontrolled external bleeding through cuts, the most severe consequence was internal joint bleedings. Such bleedings cause rapid and extremely painful swelling. Recovery and reabsorption of blood took weeks, during which the internal joints surfaces were corroded. As a result, Massie used leg braces and a wheelchair from the ages of 5 to 12.

Until 1968 the only treatment was regular intravenous transfusions of blood factors that were both extremely expensive and difficult to store and administer. The development of more affordable and easily administered blood factors greatly improved Massie's care but his childhood joint damage was not reversible.

As a result of this experience, his father, Robert Massie Sr., wrote Nicholas and Alexandra (1967), a biography of Tsar Nicholas II of Russia, whose son and heir Alexis also had hemophilia. Massie's understanding of the impact of the disease led to a dramatic reinterpretation of the influence of the Russian monk Rasputin and of the flawed actions of the royal couple that led, in part, to the Bolshevik revolution. Massie's book was a bestseller and spent nearly a year on the New York Times' bestseller list and was made into a film Nicholas and Alexandra. Bob Massie's parents also wrote a more personal account of their son's challenges, titled Journey.

From 1968 to 1972 the family lived in France, where better and more accessible health care helped Massie regain the ability to walk This experience shaped Massie's political views, including his lifelong advocacy for national health insurance in the United States.

After completing his high school requirements a year early, Massie took a gap year to work as an intern for US Senator Henry M. "Scoop" Jackson on the Senate Investigations Subcommittee, continuing his employment during the summers of 1975 and 1976.

Though only 17 years old, he wrote a ground-breaking report for Senator Jackson in which he warned of the dangers of the contamination of the blood supply by dangerous viruses such a hepatitis A and B. Senator Jackson launched an early investigation into these practices but was blocked by US Senator Charles Percy (R–IL) on behalf of the pharmaceutical manufacturers in the state of Illinois.

The delay in blood screening eventually led to more than 8,000 thousand deaths in the U.S. alone (footnote needed). Massie himself eventually contracted HIV and Hepatitis from tainted blood transfusions before effective screening was put in place.

In 1974, Massie entered Princeton University, graduating magna cum laude in 1978 with a degree in history. While at Princeton he was active in the student movement for Princeton's divestiture from South Africa, and campaigned for equal access to university dining clubs, many of which did not admit women as members.

Later, as an officer of his alumni class he established the Class of 1978 Foundation, one of the first university foundations to fund direct summer service for students.

After graduating from Princeton, he received his Master of Divinity (M.Div.) degree from Yale in 1982. He took one year off from his theological studies to work for Ralph Nader at Congress Watch, where he was the research director for a project called Big Business Day, which took place on April 17, 1980. In conjunction with Mark Green He also compiled and edited The Big Business Reader [New York: Pilgrim Press, 1980]. This experience sparked a deep interest in the role of business in American society, which led him to obtain a Doctor of Business Administration from Harvard in 1989.

== Professional career ==
After completing school, Massie was ordained as an Episcopal priest, and became a chaplain at New York City's Grace Episcopal Church, where he founded a homeless shelter. He later served as a chaplain at Christ Episcopal Church in Somerville, Massachusetts.

From 1989 to 1996 Massie lectured at Harvard Divinity School, and served as Director of the Project on Business Values and the Economy there. His teaching and research led him into the field of sustainability before the term existed.

In 1993 Massie received a Senior Fulbright Research Award to spend time in South Africa, where he taught at the University of Cape Town. In 1994 he also served as an official international observer during the first democratic elections in South Africa.

His book Loosing the Bonds: The United States and South Africa In the Apartheid Years was completed over the next four years, and published by Doubleday in 1997. It won the Lionel Gelber Prize for the Best Book on International Relations in 1998 and was reviewed favorably across the United States, including the New York Times.

From 1996 to 2003 Massie served as the executive director of Ceres, a coalition of environmental groups and institutional investors in the United States.

He also proposed and led the creation of the Investor Network on Climate Risk (now known as the Ceres Investor Network on Climate and Sustainability) and the Institutional Investor Summit on Climate Risk, a gathering of public and private sector financial leaders held every two years at UN Headquarters in New York City.

In 1998, in partnership with the United Nations and major U.S. foundations, he co-founded the Global Reporting Initiative (GRI) with Allen White. According to the most recent 2017 database, 10,613 organizations have produced 40,155 reports of which 26,675 are GRI reports.

In 2002, Massie was named one of the 100 most influential people in the field of finance by CFO magazine.

In the same year, he learned that he had contracted hepatitis C from contaminated blood medications used to treat his hemophilia. Ironically, this was the exact danger about which he had drawn attention in his Senate report 28 years earlier. He resigned from Ceres in order to pursue medical treatment. As his condition degraded, he was put on the national list for a liver transplant.

In 2010 he was awarded the Damyanova Prize for Corporate Social Responsibility by the Institute for Global Leadership at Tufts University, and in April, 2009 he received the Joan Bavaria Innovation and Impact Awards for Building Sustainability in Capital Markets.

His autobiography, A Song in the Night: A Memoir of Resilience, was published in 2012 by Nan Talese/Doubleday books.

In March 2012, Massie became the president of the New Economy Coalition, then called the New Economics Institute, an organization dedicated to moving the American economy toward greater justice and sustainability. He stepped down as president in October 2014.

In November 2015 Massie became the executive director of the Sustainable Solutions Lab at UMass Boston. That same year, he also wrote and published a small book on financial literacy for the Divinity School called A Handbook on Faith and Money, which is available to be read or downloaded for free on the Yale Divinity School website.

In 2022 Massie gave the opening address in New York City at a ceremony marking the 25th anniversary of the creation of the Global Reporting Initiative. He subsequently was invited to serve as a senior strategic advisor to the current chief executive, Eelco van der Enden.

He also has been releasing his writings, including "Fading to White" - a 100-page essay on his relationship with his father, on a Patreon site, Bob Massie's Workshop.

== Political career ==
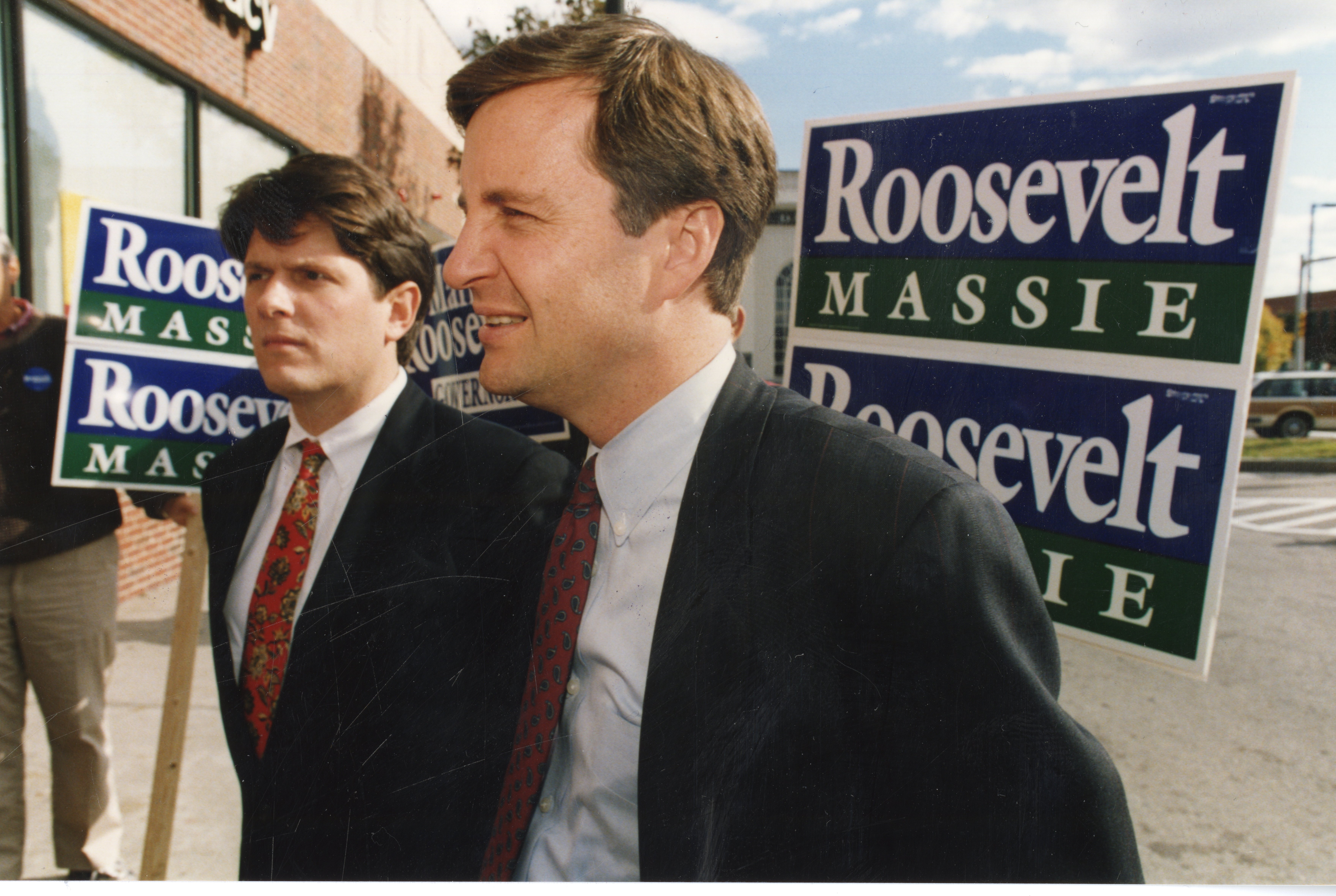
Massie (left) campaigns in 1994 alongside Mark Roosevelt in Danvers

In 1994, spurred by a sense of the urgent need for early action on climate change and sustainability, he ran for Lieutenant Governor of Massachusetts, won the statewide primary election, and became the Democratic candidate for Lieutenant Governor of Massachusetts. The Democratic ticket was defeated by incumbent Republican governor Bill Weld.

Seventeen years later, in January 2011, Massie embarked on a short campaign for the United States Senate election in Massachusetts, 2012. In April 2011, Democratic strategist Joe Trippi joined the Massie campaign. Massie ended his campaign on October 7, citing the entrance of Elizabeth Warren into the race.

During the 2016 Democratic Party presidential primary, Massie supported Bernie Sanders' candidacy.

On May 16, 2017, Massie began a campaign for the Democratic nomination in the Massachusetts gubernatorial election in 2018. His platform focused on climate change initiatives, workers' rights and economic equality. He lost the primary election on September 4, 2018.

== Personal life ==
In 1984 he was diagnosed with Human Immunodeficiency Virus (HIV), contracted in 1978, from tainted injections of his clotting factor. By 1994, before any treatments were available, he was one of the longest HIV survivors, with virtually no symptoms. Extensive study of Massie's case by Dr. Bruce D. Walker at Massachusetts General Hospital contributed to research and treatment studies around the world, and was the subject of a NOVA documentary in 1999.

In 1996, 2002, and 2020 Massie had surgeries to replace or revise his knee joints, which were damaged from the repetitive joint bleeds.

In June 2009, Massie received a liver transplant, in a procedure performed at Emory University Hospital in Atlanta, which cured not only his hepatitis C, but also his hemophilia. The clotting factor in blood is produced in the liver.

== Family ==
In 1982, while at Yale Divinity, he met Dana L. Robert, a graduate student in American religious history. They married in November, and had two sons together, Samuel (born 1987), and John (b. 1989). The couple divorced in 1995.

In 1997 Massie married Anne Tate, an architect and professor at Rhode Island School of Design, with whom he has a daughter, Katherine (b. 1998).

== Archives ==
The Seeley G. Mudd Manuscript Library at Princeton University holds a collection of Massie's papers, which includes drafts, interview notes, and research materials about South Africa and the anti-apartheid movement.

Party political offices
Preceded by Marjorie Clapprood	Democratic nominee for Lieutenant Governor of Massachusetts; 1994	Succeeded by Warren Tolman
