= Tammet =

Tammet is a surname. Notable people with the surname include:

- Alexei Tammet-Romanov (died 1977)
- Daniel Tammet (born 1979)
- Tanel Tammet (born 1965)
