= Nicholas and Alexandra =

1971 biographical film directed by Franklin J. Schaffner

- Original theatrical release poster
- Directed by: Franklin J. Schaffner
- Screenplay by: James Goldman
- Additional dialogue by: Edward Bond
- Based on: Nicholas and Alexandra (1967 book) by Robert K. Massie
- Produced by: Sam Spiegel
- Starring: Michael Jayston; Janet Suzman; Laurence Olivier; Tom Baker; Harry Andrews; Irene Worth; Jack Hawkins
- Cinematography: Freddie Young
- Edited by: Ernest Walter
- Music by: Richard Rodney Bennett
- Production company: Horizon Pictures
- Distributed by: Columbia-Warner Distributors
- Release dates: 29 November 1971 (Royal Command Performance): 13 December 1971
- Running time: 188 minutes
- Country: United Kingdom
- Language: English
- Budget: ~$9 million
- Box office: $7 million (rentals)

Nicholas and Alexandra is a 1971 British epic historical drama film directed by Franklin J. Schaffner and produced by Sam Spiegel, from a screenplay by James Goldman and Edward Bond. It is based upon Robert K. Massie's 1967 biography of the last ruling Russian monarch, Tsar Nicholas II of Russia (Michael Jayston), and his wife, Tsarina Alexandra (Janet Suzman). The film tells the story of the royal couple from 1904, through the First World War and the Russian Revolution, until their deaths in 1918.

The ensemble cast also features Tom Baker as Grigori Rasputin, Laurence Olivier as Sergei Witte, Harry Andrews as Nikolasha, Michael Redgrave as Sergey Sazonov, Michael Bryant as Vladimir Lenin, Brian Cox as Leon Trotsky, Ian Holm as Vasily Yakovlev, Vivian Pickles as Nadezhda Krupskaya, and Irene Worth as The Queen Mother Marie Fedorovna. Filming took place in Spain and Yugoslavia, and the musical score was composed by Richard Rodney Bennett.

The film was theatrically released on 13 December 1971 by Columbia Pictures to mixed reviews and commercial failure, grossing $7 million on a $9 million budget. Regardless, the film received six nominations at the 44th Academy Awards, including for Best Picture and Best Actress (Suzman), and won two: Best Art Direction and Best Costume Design.

== Plot ==
Tsarina Alexandra Feodorovna, wife of Tsar Nicholas II of Russia, gives birth to their fifth child and first son, Alexei. Despite pleas from Grand Duke Nicholas and Count Sergei Witte, Nicholas refuses to end the Russo-Japanese War or accept demands for a constitutional monarchy, believing that doing either will make him look weak and endanger the Romanov dynasty. As the war drags on, growing public unrest causes workers to march to the Winter Palace, hoping to present Nicholas with a petition demanding political representation. Soldiers open fire on the approaching crowd, killing hundreds. The resulting revolution forces Nicholas to create the Duma.

At a birthday party for the Tsar's mother, Alexandra meets Grigori Rasputin, a self-proclaimed holy man, whom she later turns to for spiritual guidance after court physicians diagnose Alexei with haemophilia. As the years go by, the close relationship between the royal family and Rasputin, along with Rasputin's behaviour, leads to public mockery of the royal family. Nicholas eventually dismisses Rasputin from the court despite Alexandra's pleas to keep him.

The Romanov Tercentenary celebrations take place, and a lavish tour across Imperial Russia follows, but resentment among the impoverished persists. Amidst the national festivities, Russian prime minister Pyotr Stolypin is assassinated. Nicholas responds by executing the assassins, allowing the police to terrorise the peasants, and closing the Duma.

After falling down at the Spała Hunting Lodge, Alexei experiences a severe bleeding attack, and it is believed he will die. Alexandra sends a telegram to Rasputin, who responds with prayer and instructions for the doctors to leave Alexei alone. His recovery is credited to Rasputin's intervention, and he is allowed to return to the imperial household.

After the assassination of Franz Ferdinand, Nicholas orders a mobilisation of the Imperial Russian Army on the European border aimed at Austria-Hungary during the July Crisis. Germany responds by declaring war. Later, with the war going badly for Russia on the Eastern Front, Alexandra persuades Nicholas to take personal command of the troops; he leaves for the front, relieving the weary but experienced Grand Duke Nicholas.

Alexandra is left nominally in charge upon Nicholas' absence but a series of poor decisions leaves her seen to be a German agent under the influence of Rasputin, resulting in growing unpopularity amongst the population at large as conditions get worse. Nicholas receives a visit from the Dowager Empress, but her requests for him to return to St. Petersburg and remove Rasputin go unheeded. Rasputin's later assassination does little to stop Alexandra's misrule, culminating in revolt by workers and soldiers in St. Petersburg. Nicholas finally attempts to return to Tsarskoye Selo but is instead forced to abdicate on his train.

The family, along with a small entourage, are exiled by Alexander Kerensky and the provisional government to Siberia after none of Russia's allies agree to grant the former royals sanctuary, fearing that the lingering resentment at their autocratic rule would unleash similar domestic revolts. However, the provisional government collapses following the seizure of power by the Bolsheviks and the country's descent into civil war. Fearing that the encroaching pro-monarchist "Whites" will attempt to restore the Romanovs, the Bolsheviks in Moscow attempt to have the royal family brought back for trial.

En route back to the capital, the royals and their escort are intercepted by representatives of the local Ural Soviet, who seize the royals and bring them to Yekaterinburg. Under harsh conditions, they are guarded by Yakov Yurovsky, who later receives orders to have the family killed. In the middle of the night the family are awoken by his men and, under the pretence they need to be transferred again, are brought to the cellar where they are executed.

== Cast ==
The Imperial Family

- Michael Jayston as Nicholas II
- Janet Suzman as Alexandra
- Roderic Noble as Alexei
- Ania Marson as Olga
- Lynne Frederick as Tatiana
- Candace Glendenning as Maria
- Fiona Fullerton as Anastasia
- Harry Andrews as Grand Duke Nicholas (Nikolasha)
- Irene Worth as Marie Fedorovna

The Imperial Household

- Tom Baker as Rasputin
- Jack Hawkins as Count Fredericks
- Timothy West as Dr. Botkin
- Katharine Schofield as Tegleva
- Jean-Claude Drouot as Gilliard
- John Hallam as Nagorny
- Guy Rolfe as Dr. Fedorov
- John Wood as Colonel Kobylinsky

The Statesmen

- Laurence Olivier as Count Witte
- Eric Porter as Stolypin
- Michael Redgrave as Sazonov
- Maurice Denham as Kokovtsov
- Ralph Truman as Rodzianko
- Gordon Gostelow as Guchkov
- John McEnery as Kerensky

The Revolutionaries

- Michael Bryant as Lenin
- Vivian Pickles as Mme. Krupskaya
- Brian Cox as Trotsky
- James Hazeldine as Stalin
- Stephen Greif as Martov
- Steven Berkoff as Pankratov
- Ian Holm as Yakovlev
- Alan Webb as Yurovsky
- Leon Lissek as Avadeyev
- David Giles as Goloshchyokin

Other characters

- Roy Dotrice as General Alexeiev
- Martin Potter as Prince Yusupov
- Richard Warwick as Grand Duke Dmitry
- Vernon Dobtcheff as Dr. de Lazovert
- Alexander Knox as the American Ambassador
- Ralph Neville as the British Ambassador
- George Rigaud as the French Ambassador
- Curt Jürgens as the German Consul
- Julian Glover as Gapon
- John Shrapnel as Petya
- Diana Quick as Sonya
- John Forbes-Robertson as Colonel Voikov

== Production ==
=== Development ===
Producer Spiegel tackled Nicholas and Alexandra when he was shut out from working with director David Lean on Doctor Zhivago, which was also set against the backdrop of revolutionary Russia. Spiegel had alienated Lean when the two worked together on the film Lawrence of Arabia, pressing the perfectionist director in order to get the movie finished on time.

Spiegel initially tried to make Nicholas and Alexandra without buying the rights to the book by Robert K. Massie, claiming that the historical account was in public domain but, eventually, Spiegel purchased the rights for $150,000. He hired writer James Goldman to adapt Massie's book as a screenplay. Goldman had written the popular play and film The Lion in Winter.

The first director was George Stevens who left the project. Anthony Harvey became involved in December 1968 but he left by February 1969. Ken Russell, Lindsay Anderson, and John Boorman were all approached but turned it down. Joseph L. Mankiewicz was briefly part of the project then Charles Jarrott joined in November 1969. After seeing Patton, Goldman recommended Franklin J. Schaffner who signed in July 1970.

Spiegel turned to former collaborators John Box for production design, and cinematographer Freddie Young (Lawrence of Arabia) to give the production the epic touch he felt it needed.

Spiegel had to work with stricter budget constraints from Columbia Studios than before. He had wanted Peter O'Toole as Rasputin and Vanessa Redgrave as Alexandra but was constrained. Notable actors such as Laurence Olivier, Irene Worth, Michael Redgrave and Jack Hawkins appeared in the film, but actor Rex Harrison turned down a supporting role as too small. Spiegel offered the role of the Empress to Grace Kelly who turned it down.

Tom Baker, a member of the Royal National Theatre, was recommended for the role of Rasputin by Laurence Olivier, then the director of the company.

=== Filming ===
Principal photography took place in Spain and Yugoslavia. Filming began in Spain in November 1970 and lasted 20 weeks.

Jack Hawkins' voice was entirely dubbed in post-production by Robert Rietti, as Hawkins had lost his voice to throat cancer.

== Historical accuracy ==
There are at least three anachronisms: Stalin uses his name at a meeting with Lenin at a party meeting in London in 1903, but he did not use the pseudonym until 1912; anyway Stalin was detained in Russia throughout 1903 and not present at the meeting. Pyotr Stolypin had been assassinated in 1911, two years before the Romanov dynasty tercentenary in which he is portrayed as being alive.

== Reception ==
=== Box office ===
By the end of the 1970s the film had lost Columbia $3 million.

=== Critical response ===
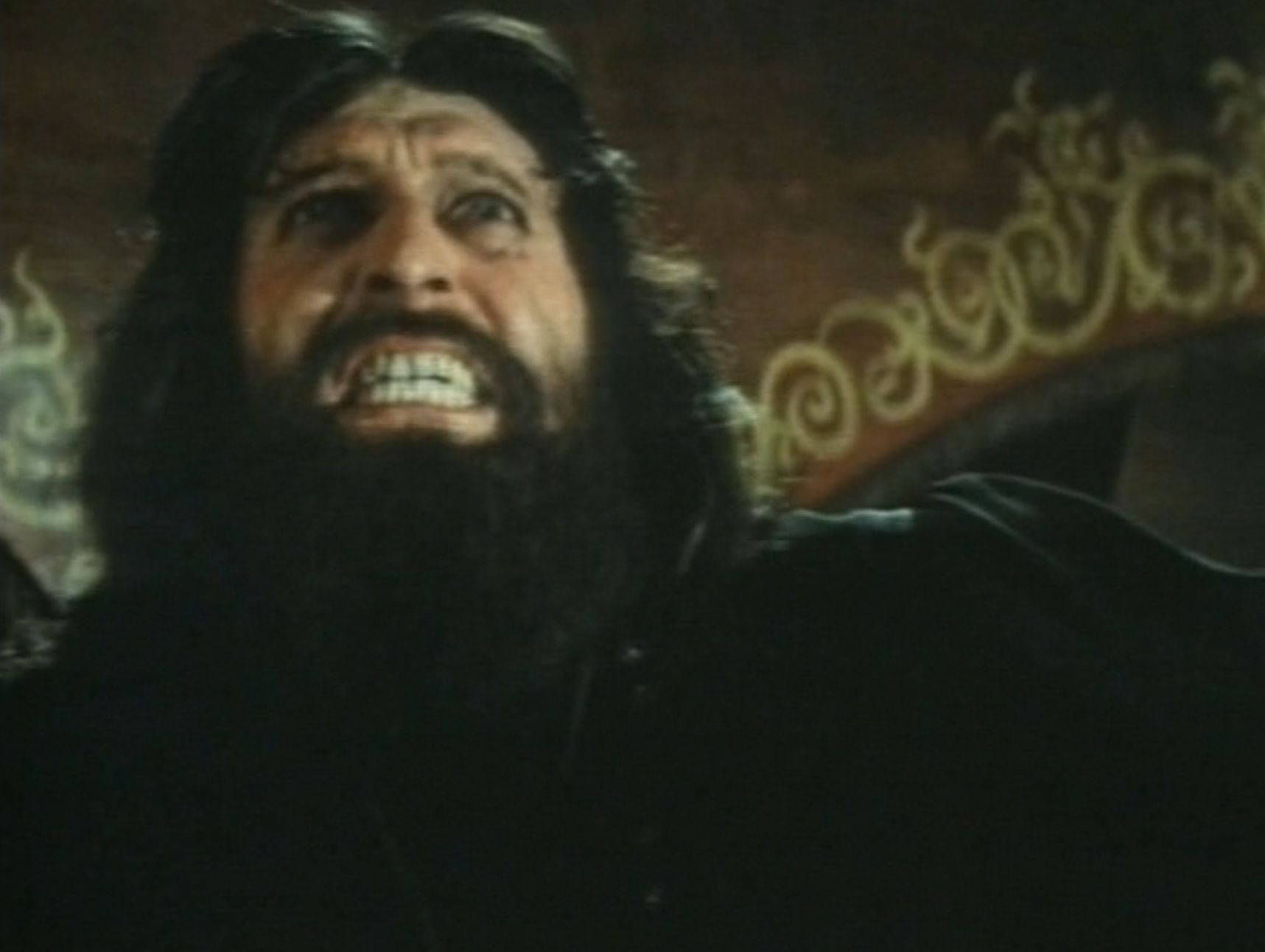
Tom Baker portrayed Grigori Rasputin, for which he was nominated for two Golden Globes.

Despite the detailed production design, photography, and strong performances from the cast, Nicholas and Alexandra failed to find the large audience it needed to be a financial success. However, it was chosen by the American National Board of Review as one of the Top 10 Films of 1971.

The review aggregator website Rotten Tomatoes reported that 67% of critics have given the film a positive review based on 15 reviews, with an average rating of 6.20/10. On Metacritic, the film has an average score of 57 out of 100 based on 10 reviews, indicating "mixed or average reviews".

Variety called it "a film of exquisite taste."

Roger Ebert of the Chicago Sun Times gave it two-and-a-half stars out of four, writing "If the movie isn't exactly stirring, however, it is undeniably interesting, especially after the intermission."

Halliwell's Film and Video Guide described Nicholas and Alexandra as an "inflated epic of occasional interest, mainly for its sets" and "generally heavy going", awarding it one star from a possible four. In 2013, Alex von Tunzelmann wrote for The Guardian, "Nicholas and Alexandra boasts terrific performances and gorgeous production design, but it's bloated and unwieldy. There is more history here than the film-makers know what to do with." For Radio Times, Tom Hutchinson awarded the film three stars out of five, describing it as a "sumptuous, if overlong, epic" which "shows the stretchmarks of too much padding" and "overwhelms us with its detail, though Tom Baker is a lot of fun as the leering mystic Rasputin". Stanley Kauffmann of The New Republic described the film as 'flabby'.

=== Awards and nominations ===
Award	Category	Nominee(s)	Result	Ref.
Academy Awards	Best Picture	Sam Spiegel	Nominated	
Academy Awards	Best Actress	Janet Suzman	Nominated	
Academy Awards	Best Art Direction	Art Direction: John Box, Ernest Archer, Jack Maxsted, and Gil Parrondo; Set Decoration: Vernon Dixon	Won	
Academy Awards	Best Cinematography	Freddie Young	Nominated	
Academy Awards	Best Costume Design	Yvonne Blake and Antonio Castillo	Won	
Academy Awards	Best Original Dramatic Score	Richard Rodney Bennett	Nominated	
British Academy Film Awards	Best Art Direction	John Box	Nominated	
British Academy Film Awards	Best Costume Design	Yvonne Blake and Antonio Castillo	Nominated	
British Academy Film Awards	Most Promising Newcomer to Leading Film Roles	Janet Suzman	Nominated	
Golden Globe Awards	Best Supporting Actor – Motion Picture	Tom Baker	Nominated	
Golden Globe Awards	New Star of the Year – Actor	Tom Baker	Nominated	
Golden Globe Awards	New Star of the Year – Actress	Janet Suzman	Nominated	
Grammy Awards	Best Original Score Written for a Motion Picture or a Television Special	Richard Rodney Bennett	Nominated	
National Board of Review Awards	Top Ten Films		6th Place	

== Home media ==
Nicholas and Alexandra received a home video release on VHS in 1987 by RCA/Columbia Pictures Home Video and reissued in the 1990s by Columbia Tristar Home Video.

Its DVD release was on 27 July 1999 from Sony Pictures Home Entertainment. The DVD featured a vintage 14-minute featurette on the production of the film and six more minutes of scenes and dialogue not found on previous VHS tapes.

The film received a Blu-ray release in February 2013 from Twilight Time. The Blu-ray featured three featurettes on the production of the film covering the makeup, costume designs and actresses playing the Tsar's daughters in the film. It also contained the original theatrical trailer as well as an isolated music score. The latter was presented in stereo even though the sound on the Blu-ray was presented in mono. The Blu-ray release was limited to only 3,000 copies. This film is also available for sale or rent as a video online download through both Amazon and Apple's iTunes Store, with Amazon's online file containing the six more minutes of scenes and dialogue that Apple's iTunes file doesn't.

== Soundtrack ==
This soundtrack was written by Richard Rodney Bennett.

1. Overture – 2:19
2. Nicholas and Alexandra – 1:26
3. The Royal Children – 1:23
4. The Palace – 1:00
5. Sunshine Days – 3:21
6. Alexandra – 1:18
7. The Romanov Tercentenary – 0:52
8. Lenin in Exile – 1:21
9. The Princessess – 2:20
10. The Breakthrough – 2:35
11. The Declaration of War – 2:55
12. Entr'acte – 2:40
13. The Journey to the Front – 1:02
14. Military March – 2:40
15. Rasputin's Death – 1:28
16. The People Revolt – 1:19
17. Alexandra Alone – 1:11
18. Farewells – 2:30
19. Dancing in the Snow – 1:11
20. Departure from Tobolsk – 1:30
21. Elegy – 1:38
22. Epilogue – 1:50

== Notes ==
- Fraser-Cavassoni, Natasha (2003). Sam Spiegel. Simon & Schuster. ISBN 978-0-684-83619-5.
