= Roderic Noble =

British actor

- Born: 3 October 1957 (age 68); Darley, North Yorkshire, England
- Education: Scorton Grammar School; University of Plymouth
- Occupation: Actor

Roderic Noble (born 3 October 1957) is an English former child actor, best known for his role as Tsarevich Alexei Nikolaevich Romanov in the 1971 film, Nicholas and Alexandra.

Noble was born in Darley, North Yorkshire in England to Reginald and Phyllis Noble. He was cast in Nicholas and Alexandra upon recommendation to the casting director Maude Spector by his elocution teacher Michael Wilde. He was chosen for the role mainly because of his resemblance to Alexei. He appeared on a single episode of The Main Chance in 1972, after which he stopped acting. After high school, he studied geology at Plymouth University.

In March 2011 he was living in Northallerton with his wife Julie, whom he met in amateur dramatics, and daughter Katie (born 1988). It was his daughter Katie who, whilst being interviewed for the British newspaper The Northern Echo in 2011, spoke of how Noble had found it "surreal" when Neil Welton first began enquiring about him for the upcoming 40th anniversary of Nicholas and Alexandra. In the Welton interview with Noble he revealed he had no formal training as an actor before making the film. He had enjoyed making the movie because "every scene was different, new and exciting". Noble also revealed the worst part of making the 1971 classic was "learning all of the lines". However he had accepted his part in the movie because it was simply "too good an opportunity to miss out on or turn down". Noble also stated in the rare interview that as part of the film was made on location, his mother cared for him when he was away from the family home. His older sister Linda then assumed this responsibility when she turned 21. Noble added that filming on location meant "every day was different and good fun".

In the Welton interview Noble revealed for the first time his own favourite scene in the film is when he climbs up a cliff in one of the early sequences. However he most enjoyed filming the closing scene "even though everyone was crying a lot". Noble also said he had been given horse-riding lessons by the production team so he could film all his own sequences. Noble added the most difficult scene to film was when he had to go down some stairs on a sled. This was because there was "very little space to actually film the sequence".

Being so young at the time, Noble was not fully aware of how good and well known all his fellow actors were. He just found them to be "encouraging and friendly" which made for a "very easy experience" when making the movie. He also singled out the "very easygoing director" Franklin J. Schaffner for praise. He was a man "not histrionic" and not prone to outbursts. Looking back Noble said he was "proud of being part of a very successful team".

== Filmography ==
- Nicholas and Alexandra (1971) as Alexei Nikolaevich, Tsarevich of Russia
- The Main Chance (1972) as Michael Kelly in Season Three, Episode Six: The Next Great Train Robbery.
