= Suzanne Massie =

American scholar of Russian history (1931–2025)

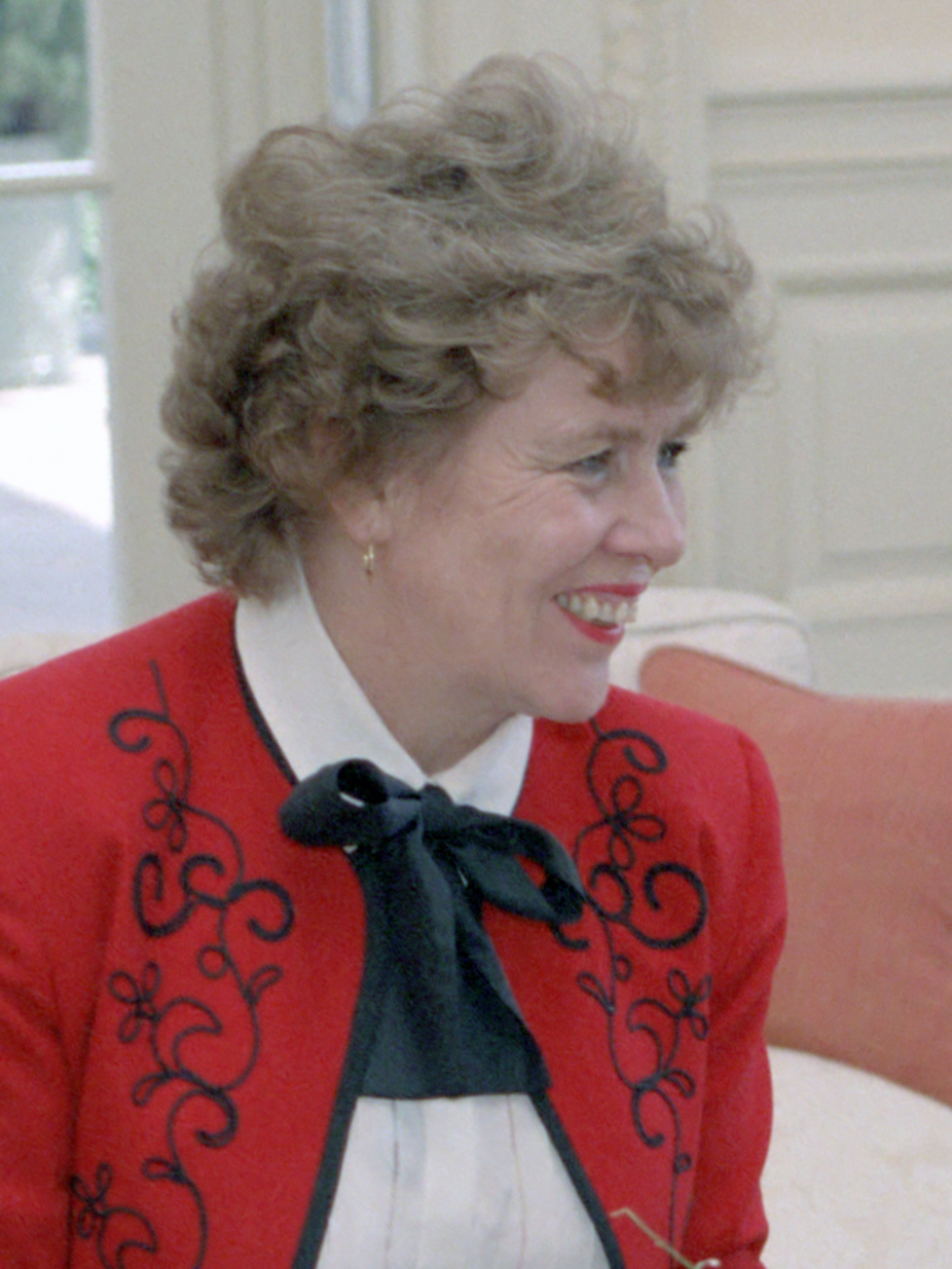
- Massie in 1984
- Born: Suzanne Liselotte Marguerite Rohrbach; January 8, 1931; New York City, U.S.
- Died: January 26, 2025 (aged 94); Harrodsburg, Kentucky, U.S.
- Citizenship: United States; Russia
- Education: Vassar College; Sorbonne; Institute of Political Studies
- Occupations: Popular historian; journalist
- Spouses: Robert K. Massie (m. 1954; div. 1990) Seymour Papert (m. 1992; died 2016)
- Children: 3, including Bob

Suzanne Liselotte Marguerite Massie (née Rohrbach; January 8, 1931 – January 26, 2025) was an American author specializing in Russian culture who played an important role in the relations between Ronald Reagan and the Soviet Union in the final years of the Cold War.

== Early life and education ==
Suzanne Liselotte Marguerite Rohrbach was born in Queens, New York, on January 8, 1931, the daughter of a Swiss diplomat, and grew up in Philadelphia. She graduated from Vassar College, but also studied at the Sorbonne and the Institute of Political Studies in Paris. She married Robert K. Massie in 1952.

== Career ==
Massie began her career as a magazine journalist, working at Gourmet, Life, and Time. Her son's diagnosis with hemophilia inspired her husband to write Nicholas and Alexandra, a biography of Nicholas II and Alexandra Feodorovna, whose son Alexei also suffered from the disease. Suzanne Massie was instrumental in the research, editing, and cover design of the book. Nicholas and Alexandra was a bestseller and was critically praised for highlighting the emotional impact of Alexei's illness on Alexandra and Nicholas II, which had previously been unexamined by historians.

In 1975, Suzanne and Robert Massie wrote about their experiences with hemophilia more directly in Journey. The book discussed the significant differences between the American and French healthcare systems.

Ronald Reagan first became interested in Massie when he read her book Land of the Firebird: The Beauty of Old Russia. She visited the White House, where she became an informal messenger between the President and Mikhail Gorbachev and his administration. She explained to Reagan about the importance of religion in Russia and this gave him a new insight. She also asked Reagan to learn the now famous Russian phrase "Doveryai, no proveryai", which translates as "Trust, but verify". The proverb rhymes in Russian and under Reagan the phrase became a White House policy. They met sixteen times and her importance in contributing to Reagan's understanding of the Russian people, assisting in reaching a peaceful end to the Cold War. This was described in detail in a number of documentary films. She applied for the job of US Ambassador to Russia via a letter to Reagan but was rejected, as the post had already been filled.

A fellow of the Harvard Russian Research Center (now the Davis Center) from 1985 to 1997, Massie also served on the board of the International League for Human Rights. In 1991, she was appointed the only lay member of the Permanent Episcopal-Orthodox Coordinating Committee, which has conducted bi-annual discussions in Russia and the United States with hierarchs of the church, including Patriarch Aleksy II. She was the fourth wife of Professor Seymour Papert and together they worked on a project called the Learning Barn in Maine.

In 2021, Massie travelled to Moscow to attend Victory Day celebrations, and in an interview with Russian broadcaster NTV, she asked President Vladimir Putin for a Russian passport, saying that the country's citizenship would be "an honor". Her request was granted on December 30, 2021.

== Personal life and death ==
From 1954 to 1990, she was married to Robert Massie; they had three children. She remarried to Seymour Papert, a researcher of artificial intelligence and education theory associated with the Massachusetts Institute of Technology, in 1992. She was a longtime resident of Blue Hill, Maine, but moved to a retirement home in Kentucky at the end of her life to be closer to family.

Suzanne Massie died from vascular dementia at a care facility in Harrodsburg, Kentucky, on January 26, 2025, at the age of 94.

== Archives ==
The Hoover Institution Library and Archives at Stanford University holds Massie's papers, which include manuscripts, correspondence, research materials, and photographs documenting her life, political involvement, and study of Russia.

== Books ==
- Massie, Suzanne, Trust but Verify: Reagan, Russia and Me, Maine Authors Publishing, 2013: Paperback and Hardcover.
- Massie, Suzanne, Land of the Firebird: The Beauty of Old Russia, Simon & Schuster 1980: Paperback; Touchstone 1982.
- Massie, Suzanne, Pavlovsk: The Life of a Russian Palace, Little Brown & Co. 1990: Paperback; HeartTree Press 1999.
- Massie, Suzanne, The Living Mirror, Doubleday & Co. Garden City New York 1972: Paperback: Anchor 1972.
- Massie, Suzanne & Robert Massie, Journey, Alfred A. Knopf, New York 1975: Paperback: Warner's 1976; Ballantine Books 1984.
