= Trust, but verify =

Russian proverb

"Trust, but verify" (Russian: доверяй, но проверяй, romanized: doveryay, no proveryay, IPA: [dəvʲɪˈrʲæj no prəvʲɪˈrʲæj]) is a Soviet Russian proverb, which rhymes in Russian. The phrase became internationally known in English after Suzanne Massie, a writer on Russian culture, taught it to Ronald Reagan, then president of the United States, who used it on several occasions in the context of nuclear disarmament discussions with the Soviet Union.

== Origins ==
Nikolay Shevchenko of Russia Beyond writes that this saying must have been originated relatively recently, since Vladimir Dal's vast collection Proverbs of the Russian People does not contain anything similar. English-language publications often attribute the phrase to Vladimir Lenin. His works do not contain the saying in its current form, but they regularly emphasize the need to proveryat 'check, test, scrutinize': "Put no faith in words; subject everything to the closest scrutiny – such is the motto of the Marxist workers"; "To test men and verify what has actually been done – ...this alone is now the main feature of all our activities, of our whole policy."

Other leaders of the early Soviet Union also used similar expressions. In a 1924 speech, Leon Trotsky called on the worker correspondents to “live not merely by the letter, but also by the spirit of Lenin's teachings, which consists of constant criticism and self-criticism: do not take anyone at their word, do not rely on rumors, verify the figures, verify the facts”. Speaking at the USSR Trade Union Congress in 1926, Mikhail Tomsky used similar wording when he addressed the need to combat embezzlement: "Don't shy away from checking up on a comrade who's managing money. ...Democracy is a system based on organized, generalized distrust. The way democracy works is that I trust you when I elect you, but once I’ve elected you, I’ll be checking up on you."

According to the paremiologist Konstantin Dushenko, doveryat i proveryat came into use in 1938 as a set phrase describing the Bolshevik Party's revised cadre policy at the late stage of the Great Purge. In January, the Central Committee condemned the indiscriminate persecution of party members carried out by local organizations, blaming it on "careerists" and "disguised enemies of the people". Historians view this resolution as the first step in winding down the Great Purge. The new policy was outlined in a leading article in the February 7 issue of Pravda titled "The Bolshevik Style of Work – Trust and Verify". It stated that "only the enemy has an interest in spreading the theory and practice of blind distrust... Trust, and at the same time verify, supervise, provide timely assistance, encourage initiative – this is the true path of Bolshevik upbringing."

Further on, the phrase came up regularly in the Soviet press. Pravda piece was echoed by a leading article in Rabochaya Moskva, the official organ of the Moscow Party Committee: "Trust, but verify – that's the Bolshevik approach to cadre management, which the Leninist-Stalinist Central Committee teaches us." The protagonist of Gleb Alyokhin's 1938 novella The Ignoramus (Note: Неуч (Neuch)) uses this phrase to summarize a Lenin quote about the class struggle against bourgeois professionals: "...Among some specialists, 'for a long time yet there will be doubts, uncertainty, intrigues, betrayals, etc.' In other words: trust and verify; hope for happiness, but stay vigilant."

The sequel of the film A Great Life, shot in 1946 but shelved until 1958, uses the saying in its current form: "The first rule: trust, but verify". In Boris Galin's documentary essay In One Settlement (Note: В одном населённом пункте (V odnom naselyonnom punkte)), published in 1947, a party official instructs a propagandist: "Take a more straightforward and blunt approach to people. Don’t just trust them! But while trusting, verify!"

The expression appears to have been first mentioned in English in the academic journal Problems of Communism in 1966. In an article about the recent Soviet economic reform, French journalist Michel Tatu referred to "Trust but verify" as a "Khrushchevian motto" that reflected the tendency of the party apparatus to influence the decisions of enterprise management.

== Soviet–American relations ==
Ronald Reagan with Suzanne Massie in Oval Office

Suzanne Massie, a writer on Russian culture, met with Ronald Reagan many times between 1984 and 1987 while he was President of the United States. She told him that the Russians like to talk in proverbs and advised him to learn some of them. Massie taught Reagan doveryai, no proveryai, which he adopted as a signature phrase and used it frequently when discussing United States relations with the Soviet Union.

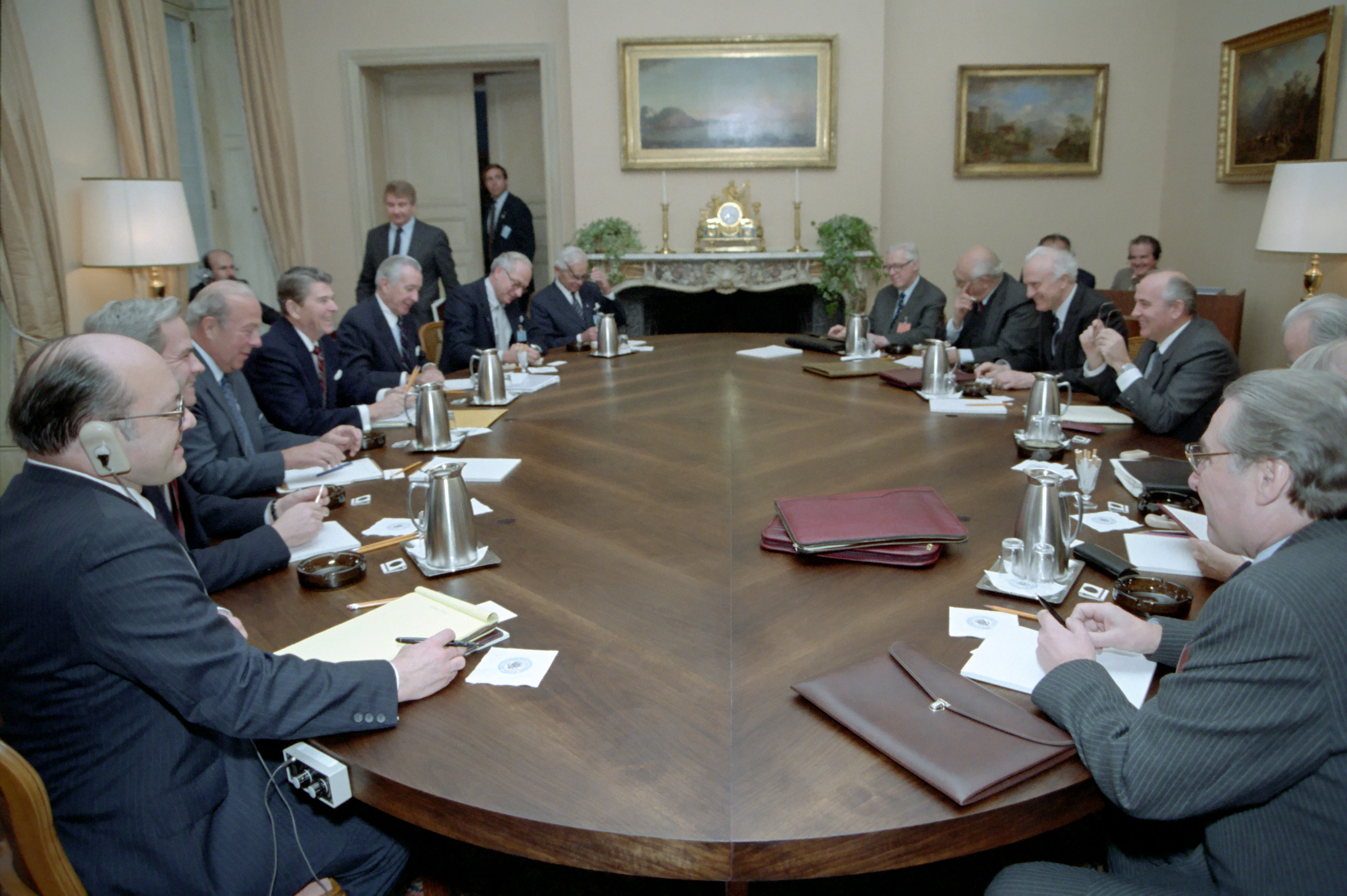
1985 Reagan–Gorbachev meeting at the Geneva Summit in Switzerland

After Reagan used the phrase to emphasize "the extensive verification procedures that would enable both sides to monitor compliance with the treaty", at the signing of the Intermediate-Range Nuclear Forces Treaty, on 8 December 1987, his counterpart General Secretary Mikhail Gorbachev responded, "You repeat that at every meeting". To this, Reagan answered, "I like it". While Reagan quoted Russian proverbs, Gorbachev quoted Ralph Waldo Emerson, who had been popular in the USSR when Gorbachev was in college, saying that "the reward of a thing well done is to have done it."

== Later use in English ==
In 1995, the similar phrase "Trust and Verify" was used as the motto of the On-Site Inspection Agency (now subsumed into the Defense Threat Reduction Agency).

In 2000, David T. Lindgren's book about how interpretation, or imagery analysis, of aerial and satellite images of the Soviet Union played a key role in superpowers and in arms control during the Cold War was titled Trust But Verify: Imagery Analysis in the Cold War.

In 2001, the National Infrastructure Protection Center (NIPC), a national critical infrastructure threat investigation and response entity, published a paper entitled "Trust but verify" on how to protect oneself and their company from email viruses.

In the study of programming languages, the phrase has been used to describe the implementation of downcasting: the compiler trusts that the downcast term will be of the desired type, but this assumption is verified at runtime in order to avoid undefined behavior.

Following the 2013 Ghouta attacks, Secretary of State John Kerry told a news conference in Geneva that the United States and Russia had agreed on a framework to dispose of Syria's chemical weapons. He said "President Reagan's old adage about 'trust but verify' ... is in need of an update. And we have committed here to a standard that says 'verify and verify'." In 2015, both Democrats and Republicans invoked the phrase when arguing for and against the proposed Iran nuclear deal framework.

The phrase has been used in relation to India–China border disputes and also following the Galwan clash during the 2020 China–India skirmishes. Variants of the phrase were also reported in the Indian media, "distrust until fully and comprehensively verified", and "verify and still not trust".

On July 24, 2020, US secretary of state Michael Pompeo referenced the proverb in a speech at the Richard Nixon Presidential Library saying that in dealing with China, the United States must instead "distrust and verify".

== See also ==
- Distrust
- Zero trust security model – Systems security model
