= Joan Bavaria =

Joan Bavaria (1943, Greenfield, Massachusetts - 2008) was an investment activist who founded and led the FRDC and CERES. She was an American artist and a college dropout when she worked her way up from a secretary at the Bank of Boston to the founder of an investment firm. She founded Trillium Asset Management (originally Franklin Research and Development Corp), and aided in the creation of the CERES (Coalition for Environmentally Responsible Economies) principles, which were originally called the Valdez Principles. She spearheaded the socially responsible investing movement in America in the 1980s.

== Education and career ==
Bavaria dropped out of college and became a secretary at the Bank of Boston. Two years after being hired as a secretary, Bavaria was made an Investment Officer. From there she began to move into Socially Responsible Investments.
