= Nicholas and Alexandra (book) =

Book by Robert K. Massie

- Cover of the 2012 Modern Library edition
- Author: Robert K. Massie
- Language: English
- Genre: Nonfiction
- Publisher: Atheneum Books
- Publication place: United States
- ISBN: 9780345438317
- OCLC: 48979244

Nicholas and Alexandra: An Intimate Account of the Last of the Romanovs and the Fall of Imperial Russia is a 1967 biography of Nicholas II and Alexandra Feodorovna of Russia by historian Robert K. Massie. Massie's interpretation focused on the impact of their son Alexei Nikolaevich's hemophilia on Nicholas and Alexandra's decisions, which had received little attention from previous historians. Nicholas and Alexandra was a bestseller and was critically well-received by both scholarly and popular audiences. In 1971, it was adapted into a film of the same name, which was directed by Franklin J. Schaffner. In 1995, Massie published a sequel, The Romanovs: The Final Chapter, which included new information about the use of DNA to identify the Romanovs' remains.

== Summary ==
Nicholas and Alexandra is a biography of Tsar Nicholas II and his wife Alexandra Feodorovna. The book focuses on their son and heir Tsarevich Alexei's hemophilia, which Massie argues influenced the fall of the Russian Empire. Alexei's illness led to Alexandra's religious fanaticism and made her susceptible to being manipulated by Grigori Rasputin, a mystic who claimed he could cure the boy. Massie suggested that Rasputin might have used hypnosis to calm Alexei during medical crises, which some modern physicians say is effective in managing hemophilia.

== Development ==
Massie was inspired to write the book after his son was diagnosed with hemophilia, a genetic disorder which Alexandra Feodorovna passed on to Tsarevich Alexei. Russian history scholar Suzanne Massie, Massie's wife, was instrumental in the research, editing, and cover design of the book. The book highlighted the emotional impact of Alexei's illness on Alexandra and Nicholas II, an angle which had been mostly unexamined by previous historians.

Massie donated his research materials and drafts to Beinecke Rare Book and Manuscript Library at Yale University.

== Reception ==
The book was well-received by both scholarly and popular audiences. It was named a bestseller by Time, sold 85,000 copies, and was translated into six languages. Historian Theodore H. Von Laue praised Massie for "doing professional [historians] a service" by drawing attention to the impact of Alexei's hemophilia on Nicholas and Alexandra's actions. Von Laue wrote in The American Historical Review that "at the heart of this book lies a sympathetic, sensitive, and always rational reconstruction of a family tragedy caused by a suffering child."

Historian Galen B. Ritchie found the book "skillfully combines scholarship and a marvelous style to produce a pleasing narrative and a sense of intellectual satisfaction," but criticized Massie for including some factual inaccuracies. It was generally considered a sympathetic biography, particularly to Nicholas II, though Ritchie observed that Massie's attempt to "rehabilitate" Nicholas was ultimately unsuccessful.

== Film adaptation and sequel ==
In 1971, the book was adapted to film, also under the title Nicholas and Alexandra, directed by American filmmaker Franklin J. Schaffner.

In 1995, Massie published The Romanovs: The Final Chapter, which included new information about the use of DNA to identify the Romanovs' remains.

== Editions ==
- Atheneum Books, 1967
- Victor Gollancz Ltd, 1968
- Dell Publishing, 1969
- Dell Publishing, 1985 ISBN 9780440363583
- Indigo, 2000 ISBN 9780575400061
- Phoenix, 2000 ISBN 9780575400061
- Ballantine Books, 2000, ISBN 0345438310
- Black Dog & Leventhal Publishers, 2005, ISBN 9781579124335
- The Modern Library, 2012, ISBN 0679645616
