= Mindy Lubber =

- Education: State University of New York at Buffalo, Suffolk University
- Occupation: Businessperson
- Years active: 1995-present
- Organization: Ceres
- Title: President

Mindy Lubber is President of Ceres, a non-profit sustainability advocacy organization based in Boston, Massachusetts. Lubber became President of Ceres in February 2003 and was a speaker at the Sustainable Innovation Forum of the 2015 United Nations Climate Change Conference.

== Education and career ==
Lubber earned an MBA from the State University of New York at Buffalo in 1976, and a J.D. from Suffolk University. She joined the U.S. Environmental Protection Agency (EPA) in 1995 as a Senior Policy Advisor and was named Regional Administrator under President Bill Clinton in 2000. In addition to her civil service duties, Lubber was the Founder and CEO of Green Century Capital Management and served as President of the National Environmental Law Center. She currently also serves as an Expert Consultant to The B Team.

== Work ==
Lubber works on developing business strategies that create value across the environmental, social, and economic spectrums. Using sustainability as the driving force of innovation, she has been noted for her work with various multinational corporations, such as Nike and American Electric Power.
