= Peter the Great: His Life and World =

1980 text by Robert K. Massi

- Author: Robert K. Massie
- Language: American English
- Subject: History of Russia, Biography of Peter the First
- Publisher: Alfred A. Knopf, New-York
- Publication date: 1980 (book dedicated to Marie Kimball Todd and James Madison Todd, In memory of Robert Kinloch Massie)
- Publication place: United States
- Pages: 860
- ISBN: 0-345-29806-3

Peter the Great: His Life and World is a 1980 biographical work written by Robert K. Massie. The book won the 1981 Pulitzer Prize for Biography or Autobiography.

== Summary ==
This work in the epic style that chronicles the life of Peter the Great reveals the will of the young Tsar to create an efficient navy as well as his ambition to modernize Russia, notably by bringing the nobility into line of Modernity, from a military point of view, from morals and thought too, and building ex nihilo on the Russian Baltic shores a European capital Saint-Petersburg. This book is divided into 61 chapters divided into five major parts : "Old Muscovy", "The Great Embassy", "The Great Northern War", "On the European Stage", and "The New Russia".

== First mixed reception of the award-winning book by some scholarly historians, with broad critics ==
Reviewing the book in the American Historical Review, James Cracraft criticized it for overlooking the main scholarly studies in English, while relying heavily on an 1884 biography by the American historian and diplomat, Eugene Schuyler. Cracraft, while stating that he cannot recommend the book to scholars, concluded:

"A colorful, dramatic, at times gripping story is told here in fine detail and in effortless prose. The book is flawlessly printed...and generously, if not always accurately, illustrated. It far surpasses, in volume rather than in acumen or grace of style, the other popular biographies of the first Russian Emperor – by Alex de Jonge and by M. S. Anderson....It will serve to advance the cause of serious history more likely than not, among the general public".

== TV Adaptation ==
It was adapted in a 1986 TV miniseries.

== Translation ==
The book Peter the Great was translated into French by Denise Meunier and published by Fayard in 1985.
