= Robert K. Massie =

American journalist and historian (1929–2019)

- Born: Robert Kinloch Massie III; January 5, 1929; Versailles, Kentucky, U.S.
- Died: December 2, 2019 (aged 90); Irvington, New York, U.S.
- Education: Yale University; University of Oxford
- Occupations: Historian, biographer
- Spouse(s): Suzanne Rohrbach (m. 1954; div. 1990) Deborah Karl (m. 1992)
- Children: 6 including Bob Massie
- Military career
- Allegiance: United States
- Branch: United States Navy
- Service years: 1950s
- Conflicts: Korean War

Robert Kinloch Massie III (January 5, 1929 – December 2, 2019) was an American journalist and historian. He devoted much of his career to studying and writing about the House of Romanov, Russia's imperial family from 1613 to 1917. Massie was awarded the 1981 Pulitzer Prize for Biography for Peter the Great: His Life and World. He also received awards for his book Catherine the Great: Portrait of a Woman (2011).

His book Nicholas and Alexandra (1967) was adapted as a British film by the same name that was released in 1971. It starred Michael Jayston and Janet Suzman in the title roles.

== Early life and education ==
Massie was born in Versailles, Kentucky, to Robert Massie Jr., an educator, and Molly, née Kimball, an activist for progressive causes. He was raised there and in Nashville, Tennessee. He earned degrees in American studies from Yale University and as a Rhodes Scholar at Oxford University. While at Oxford, Massie played on the Oxford University Men's Basketball Team. He served in the early 1950s as a nuclear targeting officer in the U.S. Navy, in the period during the Korean War.

== Career ==
Massie worked as a journalist for Collier's and from 1959 to 1962 for Newsweek before taking a position at the Saturday Evening Post. He also taught at Princeton and Tulane universities.

In 1967, after leaving the Saturday Evening Post to concentrate on his historical writing, Massie published his breakthrough book, Nicholas and Alexandra, an authoritative biography of Tsar Nicholas II (1868–1918, reigned 1894–1917) and Alexandra of Hesse (1872–1918), the last Emperor and Empress of Russia. His interest in the Russian imperial house had been inspired by the birth of his son, Robert Kinloch Massie IV, who was born with hemophilia. This hereditary disease also afflicted Nicholas's only son the Tsarevich Alexei Nikolaevich, heir apparent to the imperial throne.

His book was adapted for a film with the same title, released in 1971 and starring Laurence Olivier and Janet Suzman. It won Academy Awards for Best Costume Design and Best Art Direction-Set Decoration and was nominated for four others, as well as several Golden Globes and BAFTA Awards.

Massie and his wife Suzanne chronicled their personal experiences as parents of a hemophiliac child in Journey, published in 1975. They had moved to France, and in the book they also discussed differences between the health care systems in the US and France.

In the 1990s, much new information about the Romanovs and Russian governments became accessible after the end of the Cold War and the dissolution of the Soviet Union in 1991, when Russian and Soviet archives were opened to Westerners. In addition, the remains of the Tsar, his wife, and their children were exhumed from unmarked, hidden forest graves near their execution site. Their identities were confirmed by DNA analysis. Massie conducted additional research based on all this new information and published The Romanovs: The Final Chapter (1995). In 1998 the Romanov family were reinterred after a state funeral in the restored Russian Orthodox cathedral at the Peter and Paul Fortress in St. Petersburg, whose traditional name had been restored.

Massie continued to write biographical books on the Russian Imperial family. He won the 1981 Pulitzer Prize for Biography for Peter the Great: His Life and World.

This was the basis of an NBC television network miniseries, Peter the Great (1986), which won three Emmy Awards and starred Maximilian Schell, Laurence Olivier and Vanessa Redgrave.

In 2011 Massie published Catherine the Great: Portrait of a Woman, about the Tsarina Catherine the Great. It won the 2012 inaugural Andrew Carnegie Medal for Excellence in Nonfiction and the 2012 PEN/Jacqueline Bograd Weld Award for Biography.

He also published two books on the early 20th century: Dreadnought: Britain, Germany, and the Coming of the Great War (1991) is a diplomatic history over four decades on the causes of World War I. Castles of Steel: Britain, Germany, and the Winning of the Great War at Sea (2003) on the role of the ships in the war.

In other activities, from 1987 to 1991, Massie was President of The Authors Guild, and he served as an ex officio council member. While president, he called on authors to boycott any store that refused to carry Salman Rushdie's The Satanic Verses, which had been threatened by Islamic religious leaders.

== Personal life and death ==
Massie was married to Suzanne Rohrbach from 1954 to 1990. They divorced after having a son, Bob Massie (1956-) and two daughters. He later married Deborah Karl in 1992; she was his literary agent. They also had a son and two daughters together. Massie died from complications of Alzheimer's disease on December 2, 2019, at the age of 90.

== Archives ==
The Jean and Alexander Heard Library at Vanderbilt University holds Massie's archive, which includes drafts, research materials, cover proofs, and audiovisual media.

Massie also donated a smaller collection of his research materials and drafts relating to Nicholas and Alexandra to Yale University's Beinecke Rare Book and Manuscript Library.

== Awards and honors ==
- Rhodes Scholarship
- 1981 Pulitzer Prize for Biography, Peter the Great: His Life and World
- 1983 Golden Plate Award of the American Academy of Achievement
- 2012 Andrew Carnegie Medal for Excellence in Nonfiction, Catherine the Great
- 2012 PEN/Jacqueline Bograd Weld Award for Biography, Catherine the Great

== Bibliography ==
- Nicholas and Alexandra: An Intimate Account of the Last of the Romanovs and the Fall of Imperial Russia, focused on the impact of their son Alexei Nikolaevich's hemophilia, inspired by the Massie's own experiences with a hemophiliac child (Atheneum, 1967; Ballantine Books, 2000, ISBN 0-345-43831-0, Black Dog & Leventhal Publishers, 2005, ISBN 1-57912-433-X)
- Journey (Knopf, 1975) with Suzanne Massie, about the struggle raising their son Bob Massie, born with severe hemophilia; ISBN 0-394-49018-5
- Peter the Great: His Life and World (Knopf, 1980, ISBN 0-394-50032-6, Ballantine Books, 1981, ISBN 0-345-29806-3, Wings Books, 1991, ISBN 0-517-06483-9)
- Last Courts of Europe: Royal Family Album, 1860–1914 (Vendome Press, 1981) introductory text; picture research and description by Jeffrey Finestone, ISBN 0-86565-015-2, Greenwich House/Crown Publishers, 1983, ISBN 0-517-41472-4)
- Dreadnought: Britain, Germany, and the coming of the Great War (Random House, 1991, ISBN 0-394-52833-6, Ballantine Books, 1992, ISBN 0-345-37556-4)
- There's an Old Southern Saying: The Wit and Wisdom of Dan May (Crabby Keys Press, 1993), foreword; compiled by William May Stern, ISBN 0-9638911-0-3
- The Romanovs: The Final Chapter (Random House, 1995), ISBN 0-394-58048-6 and ISBN 0-679-43572-7
- Castles of Steel: Britain, Germany, and the Winning of the Great War at Sea (Ballantine Books, 2004), ISBN 0-345-40878-0, J. Cape, 2004, ISBN 0-224-04092-8)
- Catherine the Great: Portrait of a Woman (Random House, 2011), ISBN 978-0-679-45672-8
