= Pankratov =

Pankratov (Russian: Панкратов) is a Russian surname. People with this surname include:

- B. I. Pankratov (1892–1979), Russian linguist
- Denis Pankratov (born 1974), Russian swimmer
- Nikolay Pankratov (born 1982), Russian cross-country skier

In its feminine form Pankratova (Russian: Панкратова):

- Anna Pankratova (1897–1957), Soviet historian
- Irina Pankratova (1986–2025), Russian investigative reporter
- Svetlana Pankratova (born 1971), declared by the Guinness Book of World Records to have the longest legs of any woman
