= Investor Network on Climate Risk =

Nonprofit organization

The Investor Network on Climate Risk (INCR) is a nonprofit organization of investors and financial institutions that promotes better understanding of the financial risks and investment opportunities posed by climate change. INCR is coordinated by Ceres, a coalition of investors and environmental groups working to advance sustainable prosperity. It was launched at the United Nations in November 2003 and consists of more than 200 investors managing nearly $38 trillion in assets.

== History ==
The Investor Network on Climate Risk (INCR) was launched at the first Institutional Investor Summit on Climate Risk at the United Nations in November 2003. INCR's membership consists of more than 200 investors managing nearly $38 trillion in assets. Members include asset managers, state and city treasurers and comptrollers, public and labor pension funds, foundations, and other institutional investors. INCR leverages the collective power of these investors to promote improved investment practices, policies, disclosure and corporate governance practices on the business risks and opportunities posed by climate change.

== Accomplishments ==
- Convened 500 investors, Wall Street and corporate leaders from around the world at the United Nations headquarters in 2008 for the third Investor Summit on Climate Risk. The Summit explored the scale and urgency of climate change risks, as well as the economic opportunities of a global transition to a clean energy future.
- Launched a 9-point Action Plan, endorsed by nearly 50 leading U.S. and European investors, which calls for a series of specific steps by investors to address the growing risks and opportunities from climate change. The nine goals include policy actions aimed at the Securities and Exchange Commission (SEC) and Congress, engagement with companies to improve their disclosure and responses to climate change, minimizing climate investment risks and maximizing climate-related investment opportunities.
- INCR members have invested over $1.2 billion of their assets in renewable energy and other clean technology ventures in just 18 months. The investments cover such technologies as hydrogen fuel cells, ethanol, geothermal facilities and advanced materials.
- Persuaded more than two dozen Fortune 500 companies to improve their climate policies, practices and disclosure, including leading oil, auto and insurance companies.
- Published research reports to help investors better understand the implications of global warming. Among those: A March 2008 toolkit, “Managing the Risks and Opportunities of Climate Change: A Practical Toolkit for Investors”; an August 2006 report, From Risk to Opportunity: How Insurers Can Proactively and Profitably Manage Climate Change; and a March 2006 report, Corporate Governance and Climate Change: Making the Connection, which analyzed how 100 of the world's largest companies are addressing the business challenges of climate change.
- Established the Global Framework for Climate Risk Disclosure, a standardized set of guidelines for improving corporate disclosure on the risks and opportunities for climate change. The framework was developed in collaboration with investors worldwide.

== Making the business case ==
Given the global nature of climate change, climate risk has become embedded, to a greater or lesser extent, in every business and investment portfolio. Severe weather events and changing weather patterns, current or impending regulations imposing a cost on carbon, and an altered competitive environment will have an inescapable impact on businesses. Climate change is increasingly being seen as a strategic issue, and leading companies are taking action now to mitigate the risks and take advantage of the opportunities arising from climate change as a way to prepare for the emerging low-carbon global economy.

=== Economic risk ===
The risk that climate poses to any individual business varies, but nearly every company will face some type of pressure from the changing climate including:

Regulatory risk
Companies with significant greenhouse gas (GHG) emissions or energy-intensive operations face risks from new state, national and international regulations limiting carbon emissions and imposing a cost on carbon. While momentum for mandatory federal climate legislation is growing, California and 10 Northeastern states have already taken regulatory action to require emission reductions. Japan, China and other leading trading partners have instituted GHG emission reduction targets, fuel emission standards and renewable energy mandates. Meanwhile, all of Europe is reducing GHG emissions under a cap-and-trade carbon emissions trading program already valued at over 64 billion a year. All U.S. companies – including oil producers, banks and automakers – will be impacted by these fast-spreading regulations.
Physical risk
Businesses are at risk from the physical impacts of climate change, including the increased intensity and frequency of severe weather events such as prolonged droughts, floods, storms and sea level rise. Among the more recent examples is the $10 billion of insured losses, including the destruction of 116 oil platforms, that offshore oil producers suffered from the 2004-2005 Gulf Coast hurricanes.
Reputational and competitive risk
Tightly linked to regulatory risk in the global and domestic marketplaces, climate risk preparedness will be a key driver in a company's ability to compete. General Electric, for example, sees huge growth opportunities from its many new climate-friendly product lines, such as wind turbines, high efficiency gas turbines, IGCC power plants and hybrid diesel-electric locomotives. Ford and General Motors are currently engaged in a high-stakes struggle to remain competitive as customers turn away from gas-guzzling SUVs in favor of hybrids and other lower-emitting vehicles from Japanese competitors. In China, auto sales are surging well beyond growth rates that the U.S. market has seen in recent decades. Yet, less than a quarter of current U.S. passenger cars and light-duty trucks can meet China's 2008 emission standards.
Litigation risk
Companies in carbon-intensive industries such as oil and gas, electric utilities, and automobile manufacturing are already starting to face litigation concerning corporate contributions to global climate change. For example, eight state attorneys general, the City of New York and three land trusts brought suit in 2005 against the five largest electric utilities in the U.S., on the grounds that they were substantial contributors to the "public nuisance" of global warming. These and other similar cases pose a significant risk to businesses. Should the courts find against companies in such cases, the potential liability is immense. Even if some of the suits are unsuccessful, the costs of litigation and the reputation damage incurred by companies involved could be damaging in their own right.

=== Opportunity ===
Companies at the vanguard are increasingly finding that indeed, addressing global warming is good for the bottom line. The costs to reduce greenhouse gas emissions can be counterweighed by the potential profits. Climate change poses risks to industry, but it also presents opportunities: Some companies are already taking advantage of new products, markets, and competitive advantages inherent in the low-carbon economy.

Where there is challenge, there is the potential for growth. Companies have identified business opportunities in the green economy sector in response to the financial and competitive risks associated with climate change, forward-looking companies are finding the potential for enormous business opportunities as well.

Clean technology, renewable energy sources, carbon emissions trading markets and energy efficiency efforts are the most vivid examples of these opportunities: the growth of global markets for renewable energy, for example, hit $50 billion in 2005, and the market is projected to eclipse $150 billion by 2015. Companies are seizing on opportunities for creating new low-carbon energy-efficient products — GE's "ecomagination" program, for example, is expected to have sales of $20 billion by 2010. But companies in other sectors are reaping the benefits, too—banks, insurers, and others in the financial industry are also finding innovative ways of proving that for business, "green is green." Climate change, like any momentous challenge, provides opportunities for growth for companies willing to be leaders. Hand in hand with the financial and competitive risks of climate change come opportunities to increase shareholder value, increase brand value and enhance competitiveness and profitability.

=== U.S. companies ===
Since 2004, corporate leaders in many US industries and leading investors have begun to meet the climate challenge.

- In 2004, US-based financial institutions were focusing little or no attention on climate change as a core business strategy. In 2007, Bank of America and Citigroup announced $20 billion and $50 billion programs, respectively, to support the growth of environmentally sustainable business activity to address global climate change. The decade-long initiatives include a major focus on lending, investing and other activities to support 'green' economic growth, whether in building design, carbon emissions trading or low-carbon technologies.
- Before 2004, few U.S. electric power companies acknowledged the risks related to climate change. In 2004, American Electric Power released a strategic analysis of the risks and opportunities posed by climate change, and in 2007 announced plans to build the first commercial-scale power plant using coal gasification technology, calling it the "right investment" given foreseeable GHG regulations. More than a dozen leading power companies are indicating that GHG regulations are likely and are now advocating for a national climate policy with mandatory controls.
- In 2004, U.S.-based petroleum companies had virtually a single-minded focus on oil and gas development. In 2007, ConocoPhillips announced its support for a mandatory federal policy to cap greenhouse gas emissions and committed $150 million towards alternative fuels research.
- In 2004, no U.S.-based insurance companies incorporated the risks of climate change in their business. In 2006, AIG became the first U.S. insurance company to adopt a corporate climate change policy to actively seek ways for AIG and its clients to cut greenhouse gas emissions.
- In 2004, few companies were willing to advocate for mandatory federal carbon regulation. In 2007, more than 20 leading companies, including Alcoa, BP America, Caterpillar, Dow Chemical, DuPont, Ford Motor Co., Johnson & Johnson, and others, issued a formal call for national legislation calling for significant reductions in GHG emissions. And these companies are among a growing chorus of voices: In March 2007, more than 60 investors, asset managers and companies managing $4 trillion in assets released a climate policy call to action requesting prompt tangible action by US lawmakers to tackle global climate change.

And companies have begun to reap the benefits:

Cost savings
DuPont reduced greenhouse gas emissions by 70 percent between 1990 and 2004, increasing production by 33 percent during that time while also saving over $2 billion.
Increased productivity
Walmart has committed to improving the fuel efficiency of its trucking fleet by 25 percent over the next three years, and stands to save $50 million per year from an improvement of only one mile per gallon in fleet efficiency.
New markets
General Electric's "ecomagination" program has a goal of $20 billion of sales by 2010; it had $12 billion in sales in 2006 alone, with $50 billion worth of back orders for products such as diesel-electric hybrid locomotives, components for hydrogen power and energy-efficient LED bulbs.

== See also ==
- Ceres
- Climate risk
- Institutional investors
