= Alexei Tammet-Romanov =

Romanov impostor

Alexei Tammet-Romanov was the name assumed by Ernest Veermann (died June 26, 1977), an Estonian immigrant to Canada, when he claimed to be the last heir to the throne of Russia, Tsarevich Alexei Nikolaevich of Russia. For many years prior to this, Veerman had been known as Heino Tammet, a name he first used when in the printing business. A few of his postcards are extant.

Veerman began to claim he was Alexei Nikolaevich when he was 68 years old. Letters to British royalty, claims that he had met Scandinavian royalty and other such incidents led to a visit from the RCMP, a medical examination and a gentle warning to cease and desist. His belief that he was once the young prince persisted more quietly, while his health gradually declined. Veermann died of a form of leukemia in 1977.

His claims are championed at present only by his third wife, Sandra, and by Vancouver journalist John Kendrick.

Unfortunately for the claim, the tsarevitch Alexei was a hemophiliac, and Heino Tammet was not. In an attempt to explain this away, Kendrick has maintained that the Tsarevitch's disease was misdiagnosed, and that Tammet had a disease that might conceivably cause similar symptoms. An article written by Kendrick, and published in the American Journal of Hematology, provided a full exposition of Kendrick's hypothesis, though without any disclosure of its relationship to the Tammet case. Subsequent genetic studies have determined that the disease prevalent in the family was hemophilia B and that the remains generally believed to be those of Alexei are those of a person who suffered from hemophilia B. They do not, however, establish conclusively that Alexei suffered from hemophilia B if it is not assumed that the remains analyzed are his.

Tammet's wife gave a tooth (or teeth) to scientists for DNA testing, but the tests were not done and the specimen has not been returned. No other suitable specimens have been submitted for testing.

Tammet, deaf in one ear, claimed that was the result of a gunshot at close range fired by Yurovsky near the tsarevitch's ear. Tammet also claimed that he had an undescended testicle corresponding to the tsarevitch's undescended testicle.

In July 2007, the remains of the Tsarevich Alexei and his missing sister were discovered in the Koptyaki Forest, in just such circumstances as Yakov Yurovsky described. This accounts for all the members of the Russian Imperial Family.
