= Ceres (organization) =

U.S. nonprofit organization

- Formation: 1989; 37 years ago
- Founder: Joan Bavaria
- Type: Nonprofit
- Tax ID no.: 22-3053747
- Legal status: 501(c)(3)
- Purpose: Sustainability
- Headquarters: Boston, Massachusetts
- Region served: United States
- Method: Advocacy
- Staff: Approx. 130
- Website: www.ceres.org

Ceres is a non-profit sustainability advocacy organization based in Boston, Massachusetts, and founded in 1989. As of May 2017, its president is Mindy Lubber.

== History ==
Ceres was founded in 1989 when Joan Bavaria, then-president of Trillium Asset Management, formed an alliance with leading environmentalists with the goal of changing corporate environmental practices. She named the organization the "Coalition for Environmentally Responsible EconomieS", or CERES. Ceres was the ancient Roman goddess of fertility and agriculture.

That same year, following the Exxon Valdez oil spill, CERES announced the creation of the Valdez Principles (later renamed the CERES Principles), a ten-point code of corporate environmental conduct to be publicly endorsed by Ceres companies.

In 1993, following lengthy negotiations, Sunoco became the first Fortune 500 company to endorse the Ceres Principles. Since then, over 50 companies have endorsed the Ceres Principles, including 13 Fortune 500 companies that have adopted their own equivalent environmental principles.

In 2003, the organization rebranded itself as "Ceres".

On January 27, 2016, Ceres and the United Nations Foundation convened the seventh Investor Summit on Climate Risk at the United Nations in New York, attended by more than 110 institutional investors who collectively represented more than $22 trillion in assets, with a goal of doubling global investment in clean energy by 2020.

== Ceres principles ==
First published in the fall of 1989, the Ceres Principles are a ten-point code of corporate environmental ideals to be publicly endorsed by companies as an environmental mission statement or ethic. The 10 Ceres Principles are:

- Protection of the biosphere
- Sustainable use of natural resources
- Reduction and disposal of wastes
- Energy conservation
- Risk reduction
- Safe products and services
- Environmental restoration
- Informing the public
- Management commitment
- Audits and reports

== Key accomplishments ==
- Launched the Global Reporting Initiative (GRI), now the de facto international standard used by over 1,200 companies for corporate reporting on environmental, social and economic performance.
- Founded and directs the Investor Network on Climate Risk (INCR), a group of 100 leading institutional investors with collective assets of more than US$10 trillion. Its members include Deutsche Asset Management, State Street Global Advisors, and TIAA-CREF, as well as the pension funds of California, Florida, and New York.
- Coordinates the bi-annual United Nations Investor Summit on Climate Risk, which brings together hundreds of investors, financial and corporate leaders to address financial risks and opportunities posed by climate change. In 2008, nearly 50 leading U.S. and European institutional investors managing over US$1.75 trillion in assets released a 9-point climate change action plan that will increase investments in energy efficiency and clean energy technologies and require tougher scrutiny of carbon-intensive investments that may pose long-term financial risks.

== Awards and recognition ==
In 2007, Ceres was named one of the 100 most influential players in corporate governance by Directorship magazine. Ceres was a recipient of the Skoll Foundation Award for Social Entrepreneurship in 2006, as well as a recipient of the Fast Company Social Capitalist Awards in 2008.

== See also ==
- Corporate social responsibility
- Sustainable business
- Climate risk
- Sustainability reporting
- Business For Innovative Climate and Energy Policy
