= Alexei Nikolaevich, Tsarevich of Russia =

Heir to the Russian throne (1904–1918)

Alexei Nikolaevich
- Tsesarevich
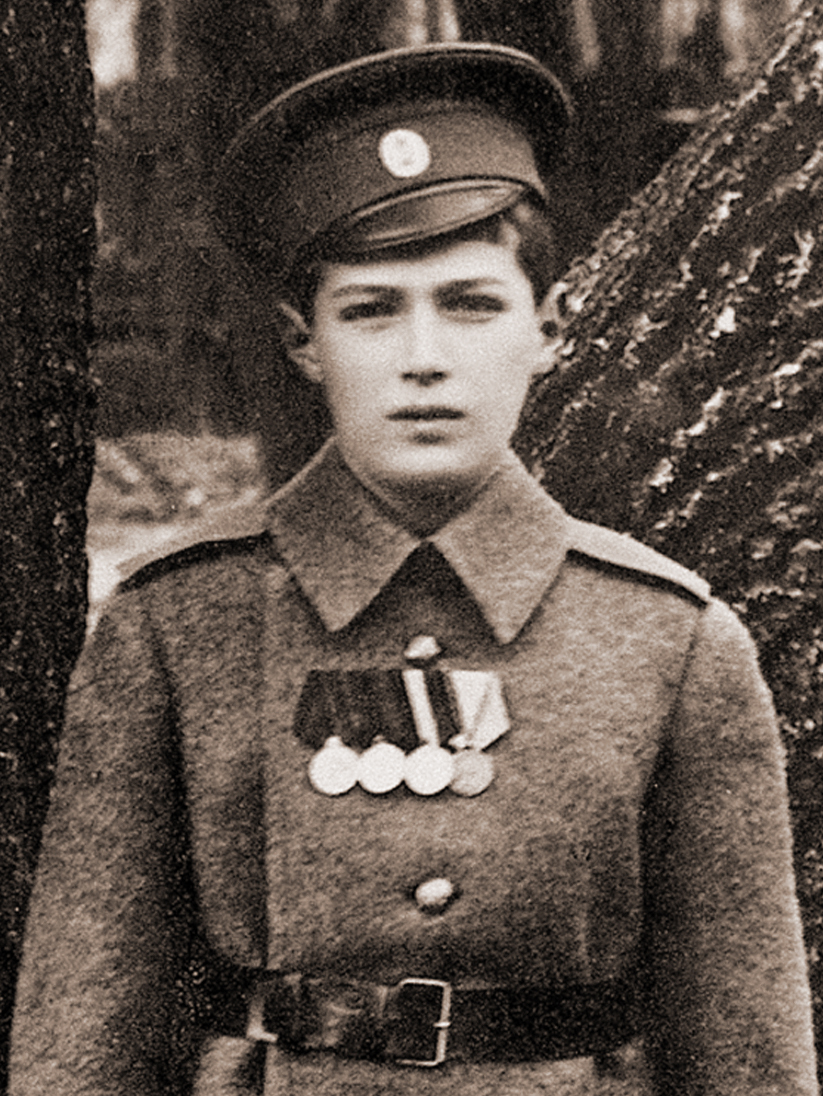
- Alexei in 1916
- Born: 12 August 1904; Peterhof Palace, Saint Petersburg, Russia
- Died: 17 July 1918 (aged 13); Ipatiev House, Yekaterinburg, Russia
- Cause of death: Gunshot wounds (murder)
Names
- Alexei Nikolaevich Romanov
- House: Holstein-Gottorp-Romanov
- Father: Nicholas II of Russia
- Mother: Alexandra Feodorovna of Hesse and by Rhine
- Religion: Russian Orthodox

Alexei Nikolaevich (Russian: Алексей Николаевич, romanized: Aleksey Nikolayevich; 12 August [O.S. 30 July] 1904 – 17 July 1918) was the last Russian tsesarevich (heir apparent). (Note: The title tsesarevich was introduced in the 1797 Pauline Laws as the title of the heir apparent of the Emperor of Russia. The older tsarevich was a title given to any son of a tsar, and historically also to sons of non-Russian rulers, e.g. of Crimea, Siberia or Georgia. The 1797 law abolished tsarevich as an official title, even though sons of tsars continued to be referred to as tsarevich in informal use.) He was the youngest child and only son of Tsar Nicholas II and Tsarina Alexandra Feodorovna. He was born with haemophilia, which his parents tried treating with the methods of peasant faith healer Grigori Rasputin.

After the February Revolution of 1917, the Romanovs were sent into internal exile in Tobolsk, Siberia. After the October Revolution, the family was initially to be tried in a court of law, before the intensification of the Russian Civil War made execution increasingly favourable in the eyes of the Soviet government. With White Army soldiers rapidly approaching, the Ural Regional Soviet ordered the murder of Alexei, the rest of his family in the Ipatiev house, and four remaining retainers on 17 July 1918. Rumours persisted for decades that Alexei had escaped his execution, with multiple impostors claiming his identity. Alexei's remains, along with those of his sister Maria (or Anastasia), were ultimately discovered in a secondary grave near the rest of the Romanov family in 2007. On 17 July 1998, the 80th anniversary of their execution, Alexei's parents, three of his sisters, and the four retainers, were formally interred in the Cathedral of St. Peter and Paul, while Alexei's and Maria's (or Anastasia's) bones remain in Russian state archives. The Romanov family was canonized as passion bearers by the Russian Orthodox Church in 2000.

Alexei is sometimes known to Russian legitimists as Alexei II after his ancestor Alexis of Russia, as until his death they do not recognize the abdication of his father in favor of his uncle Grand Duke Michael as lawful.

== Biography ==
=== Early years ===
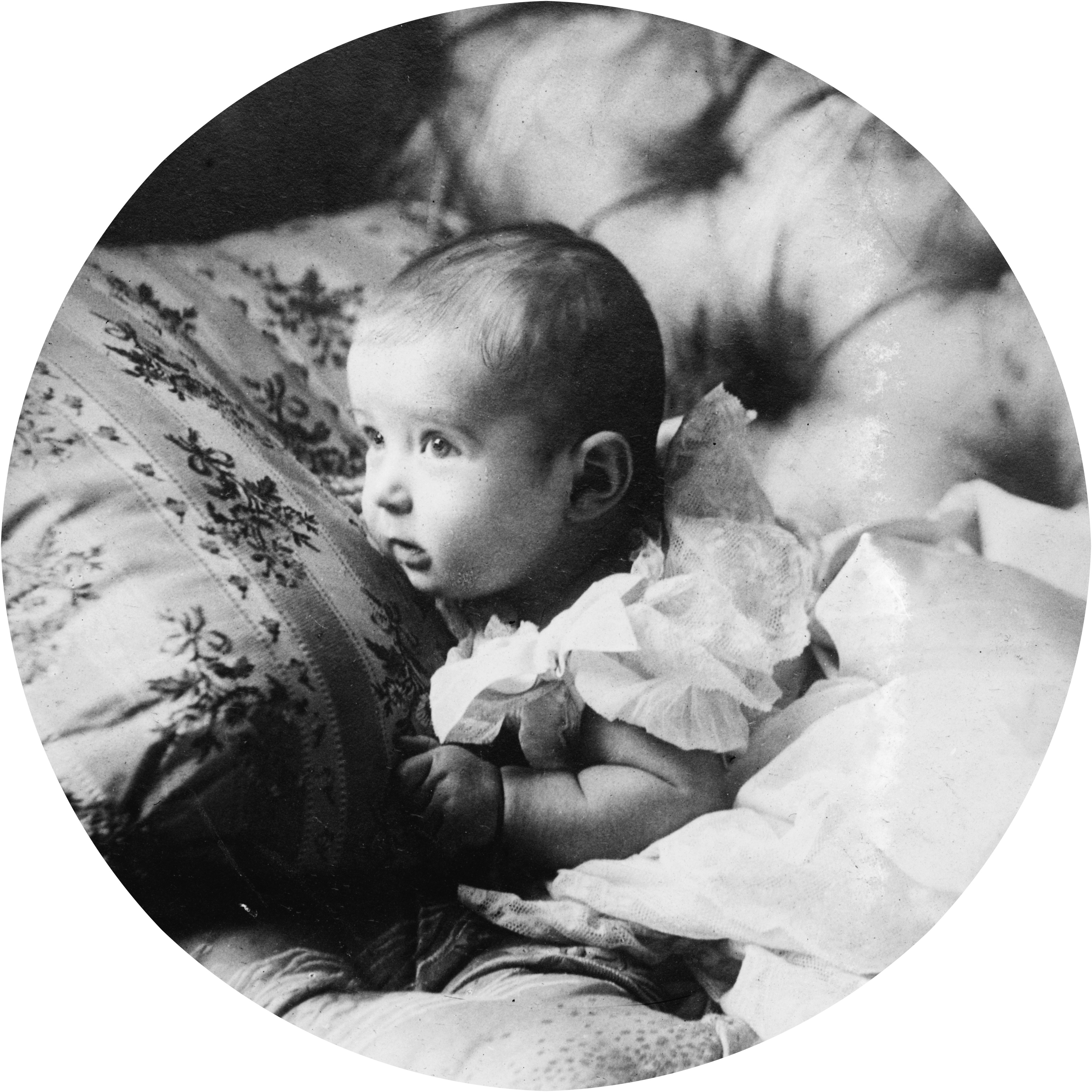
Alexei as an infant in 1904

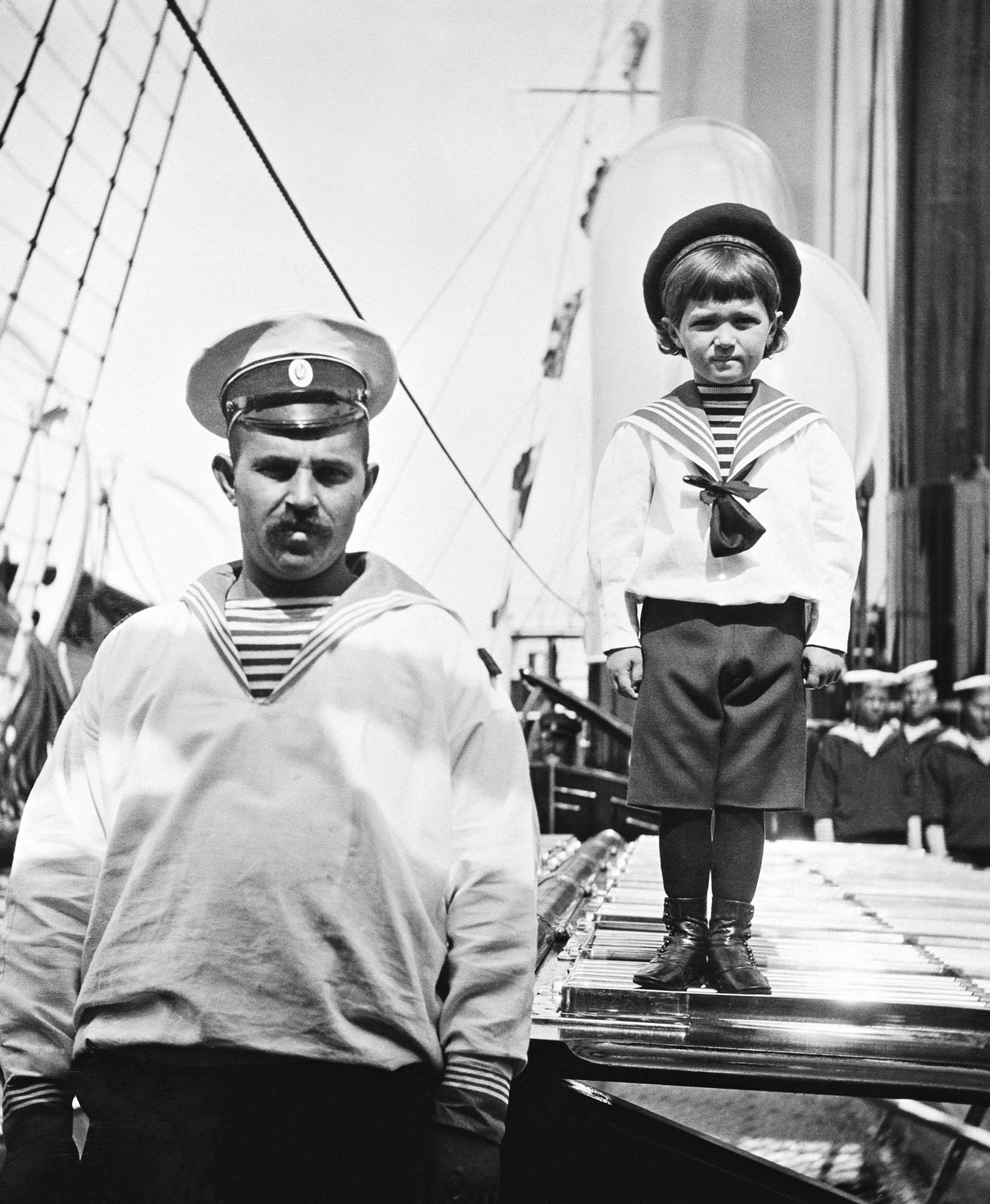
Alexei (right) with his sailor nanny Andrei Derevenko aboard the Imperial yacht Standart in 1908

Alexei was born on 12 August [O.S. 30 July] 1904 at Peterhof Palace, St. Petersburg Governorate, Russian Empire at 12:30 PM. He was the youngest of five children and only son of Emperor Nicholas II and Empress Alexandra Feodorovna; his older sisters were the Grand Duchesses Olga, Tatiana, Maria, and Anastasia. His father was the eldest son of Emperor Alexander III and Princess Dagmar of Denmark, and his mother was the sixth child of Louis IV, Grand Duke of Hesse, and Princess Alice of the United Kingdom. His paternal great-grandparents were Alexander II of Russia, Princess Marie of Hesse, Christian IX of Denmark and Louise of Hesse-Kassel, while his maternal great-grandparents were Queen Victoria and her husband Albert, Prince Consort. Nicholas named Alexei after Alexis of Russia, his favorite emperor. His doting family called him "Baby." He was later also affectionately referred to as Alyosha (Алёша).

Alexei's birth was greeted with widespread joy because he was the first son Nicholas had had after four daughters. When she woke up from the chloroform, Alexandra saw the happy faces around her and exclaimed: "Oh, it cannot be true. It cannot be true. Is it really a boy?" Nicholas wrote in his diary that today was "a great and unforgettable day for us . . . there are no words to thank God enough for sending us this comfort in a time of sore trials." According to Grand Duke Constantine Constantinovich of Russia, Nicholas's younger brother Grand Duke Michael Alexandrovich "was radiant with happiness at no longer being heir." Baroness Sophie Buxhoeveden remembered that "we were nearly deafened by the church bells ringing all day". St. Petersburg "was ablaze with flags" and "the people gave themselves over to public rejoicing." Nicholas granted political amnesty to prisoners and set up a fund for military and naval scholarships.

As soon as he was born, Alexei was granted the title of tsarevich and heir apparent to the Imperial Throne of Russia. An official announcement read, "From now on, in accordance with the Fundamental Laws of the Empire, the Imperial title of Heir Tsarevich, and all the rights pertaining to it, belong to Our Son Alexei."

Alexei was christened on 3 September 1904 in the chapel in Peterhof Palace. His principal godparents were his paternal grandmother and his great-uncle, Grand Duke Alexei Alexandrovich. His other godparents included his oldest sister, Olga; his great-grandfather King Christian IX of Denmark; King Edward VII of the United Kingdom, the Prince of Wales and Wilhelm II, German Emperor. As Russia was at war with Japan, all active soldiers and officers of the Russian Army and Navy were named honorary godfathers.

=== Hemophilia ===
Alexei inherited hemophilia from his mother Alexandra, an X chromosome hereditary condition that typically affects males, which she had acquired through the line of her maternal grandmother Queen Victoria of the United Kingdom. It was known as the "royal disease" because so many descendants of the intermarried European royal families had it (or carried it, in the case of females). In 2009, genetic analysis determined that Alexei had hemophilia B.

At first, Alexei seemed like a healthy, ordinary baby. He weighed 11 pounds at birth. His paternal aunt Xenia wrote that "he's an amazingly hefty baby with a chest like a barrel and generally has the air of a warrior knight." After his umbilical cord was cut, his navel continued to bleed for hours, and his blood did not clot. Nicholas wrote that Alexei lost "1/8 to 1/9 of the total quantity" of his blood in 48 hours. Nicholas reflected in his diary that "Alix and I were very alarmed by the bleeding of young Alexei that came at intervals from his umbilical cord until evening. How painful it is to experience such anxieties!" Alexandra wrote, "Oh, what anguish it was... not to let others see the knife digging in one." According to his French tutor, Pierre Gilliard, the nature of his illness was kept a state secret, and the information was even withheld from some family members.

There were rumors about what Alexei's disease was because of the secrecy around it. Guesses ranged from a "certain form of infantile tuberculosis which gives rise to acute alarm" to "one of the layers of his skin was missing." An American magazine ascribed Alexei's "ill health" to "the misfortune that so many residences of the tsars leave much to be desired from the point of view of sanitary science." After Alexei's life-threatening hemorrhage at Spala, the American press speculated that Alexei had been stabbed "during an unguarded moment" by a "nihilist." The Times observed that the "incomprehensible silence of the Court bulletins" gave "free scope to the sensation-mongers."

His hemophilia was so severe that trivial injuries such as a bruise, a nosebleed, or a cut were potentially life-threatening. His parents constantly worried about him. In addition, the recurring episodes of illness and long recoveries interfered greatly with Alexei's childhood and education. When he was 5, Alexei was assigned two navy sailors who monitored him at all times to ensure that he wouldn't injure himself. His parents appointed two sailors from the Imperial Navy: Petty Officer Andrei Derevenko and his assistant Seaman Klementy Nagorny. Anna Vyrubova, Alexandra's friend, remembered that "Derevenko was so patient and resourceful, that he often did wonders in alleviating the pain. I can still hear the plaintive voice of Alexis begging the big sailor, 'Lift my arm,' 'Put up my leg,' 'Warm my hands,' and I can see the patient, calm-eyed man working for hours to give comfort to the little pain-wracked limbs."

==== Rasputin ====
In the autumn of 1907, Alexei fell and hurt his leg while playing in Alexander Park. The fall triggered an internal hemorrhage. His paternal aunt Grand Duchess Olga Alexandrovna of Russia reflected that "the poor child lay in such pain, dark patches under his eyes and his little body all distorted, and the leg terribly swollen." The doctors could do nothing. Alexandra telegraphed Princess Anastasia of Montenegro and asked her to find the Christian mystic and faith healer Grigori Rasputin. Rasputin prayed over Alexei and told Alexei, "Your pain is going away. You will soon be well. You must thank God for healing you. And now, go to sleep." Soon after Rasputin left, the swelling in Alexei's leg went down. Alexei's sister Olga was amazed by Alexei's swift recovery, and she wrote that the next morning Alexei "was not just alive— but well. He was sitting up in bed, the fever gone, the eyes clear and bright, not a sign of any swelling on his leg."

In September 1912, Alexei and his family visited their hunting retreat in the Białowieża Forest. On 5 September, Alexei jumped into a rowboat and hit his groin on the oarlocks. A large bruise appeared within minutes but in a week reduced in size. In mid-September, the family moved to Spała (then in Russian Poland). On 2 October, Alexei accompanied his mother on a drive in the woods. The "juddering of the carriage had caused a still-healing hematoma in his upper thigh to rupture and start bleeding again." He had to be carried out of the carriage in an almost unconscious state. His temperature rose, his heartbeat dropped, and he hemorrhaged in his upper thigh and abdomen. For 11 days, he screamed, "O Lord, have mercy on me!" and begged Alexandra, "Mama, help me!" He asked Alexandra to "build me a little monument of stones in the woods" and asked "When I'm dead, it won't hurt any more, will it?" Alexandra never left his bedside, and she refused to rest or eat. Nicholas "took turns with Alix to sit with Alexei," but he "rushed weeping bitterly to his study" when he saw Alexei scream. On 6 October, Alexei's fever rose to 39 degrees, and he hemorrhaged into his stomach. On 8 October, Alexei received the last sacrament. Alexei's tutor, Pierre Gilliard, wrote to his children, "Pray, my children, pray daily and fervently for our precious heir." On 10 October, a medical bulletin announcing Alexei's impending death was published in the newspapers.

On 9 October, Alexandra asked her lady-in-waiting and best friend, Anna Vyrubova, to secure the help of Rasputin. According to his daughter, Rasputin received the telegram on 12 October. (Note: If Rasputin's daughter was right about the day that her father responded – 13 October – "the longstanding claim that Rasputin had somehow alleviated Alexei's condition is simply fictitious.") On 9 October, Alexandra received a short telegram from Rasputin: "The little one will not die. Do not allow the doctors [c.q. Eugene Botkin and Vladimir Derevenko] to bother him too much." Alexei's temperature dropped, and he began to improve. According to General Mosolov, the doctors "seemed in utter consternation" at Alexei's sudden recovery. On 10 October, Doctor Eugene Botkin wrote to his children that "our priceless patient" was "undoubtedly significantly better." The positive trend continued throughout the next day. On 19 October, Alexei's condition was much better and the hematoma disappeared. The boy had to undergo orthopedic therapy to straighten his left leg. Feodorov confirmed that Alexei's recovery was "wholly inexplicable, from a medical point of view."

According to Pierre Gilliard's 1921 memoir,

The Tsar had resisted the influence of Rasputin for a long time. At the beginning, he had tolerated him because he dared not weaken the Tsarina's faith in him – a faith which kept her alive. He did not like to send him away, for, if Alexei Nicolaievich had died, in the eyes of the mother, he would have been the murderer of his own son.

Observers and scholars have offered suggestions for Rasputin's apparent positive effect on Alexei: he used hypnotism, administered herbs to the boy, or his advice to prevent too much action by the doctors aided the boy's healing. Robert K. Massie suggested that Rasputin used hypnosis to calm Alexei during medical crises, which some modern physicians say is effective in managing hemophilia. Others speculated that, with the information he got from his confidante at the court, lady-in-waiting Anna Vyrubova, Rasputin timed his "interventions" for times when Alexei was already recovering, and claimed all the credit. Court physician Botkin believed that Rasputin was a charlatan and that his apparent healing powers were based on the use of hypnosis, but Rasputin did not become interested in this practice before 1913 and his teacher Gerasim Papandato was expelled from St. Petersburg. Felix Yusupov, one of Rasputin's enemies, suggested that he secretly gave Alexei Tibetan herbs, which he got from quack doctor Peter Badmayev, but these drugs were rejected by the court. Maria Rasputin believed her father exercised magnetism.

Writers from the 1920s had a variety of explanations for the apparent effects of Rasputin. Greg King thinks such explanations fail to take into account those times when Rasputin apparently healed the boy, despite being 2600 km (1650 miles) away. For historian Fuhrmann, these ideas on hypnosis and drugs flourished because the Imperial Family lived in such isolation from the wider world. ("They lived almost as much apart from Russian society as if they were settlers in Canada.") Moynahan says, "There is no evidence that Rasputin ever summoned up spirits, or felt the need to; he won his admirers through force of personality, not by tricks." Shelley said that the secret of Rasputin's power lay in the sense of calm, gentle strength, and shining warmth of conviction. Radzinsky wrote in 2000 that Rasputin believed he truly possessed a supernatural healing ability or that his prayers to God saved the boy.

Gilliard, the French historian Hélène Carrère d'Encausse and Diarmuid Jeffreys, a journalist, speculated that Rasputin may have halted the administration of aspirin. This pain-relieving analgesic had been available since 1899 but would have worsened Alexei's condition. Because aspirin is an antiaggregant and has blood-thinning properties, it prevents clotting and promotes bleeding, which could have caused the hemarthrosis. The anti-inflammatory drug would have worsened Alexei's joints' swelling and pain. According to historian M. Nelipa, Robert K. Massie was correct to suggest that psychological factors play a part in the course of the disease.

=== Military influence ===
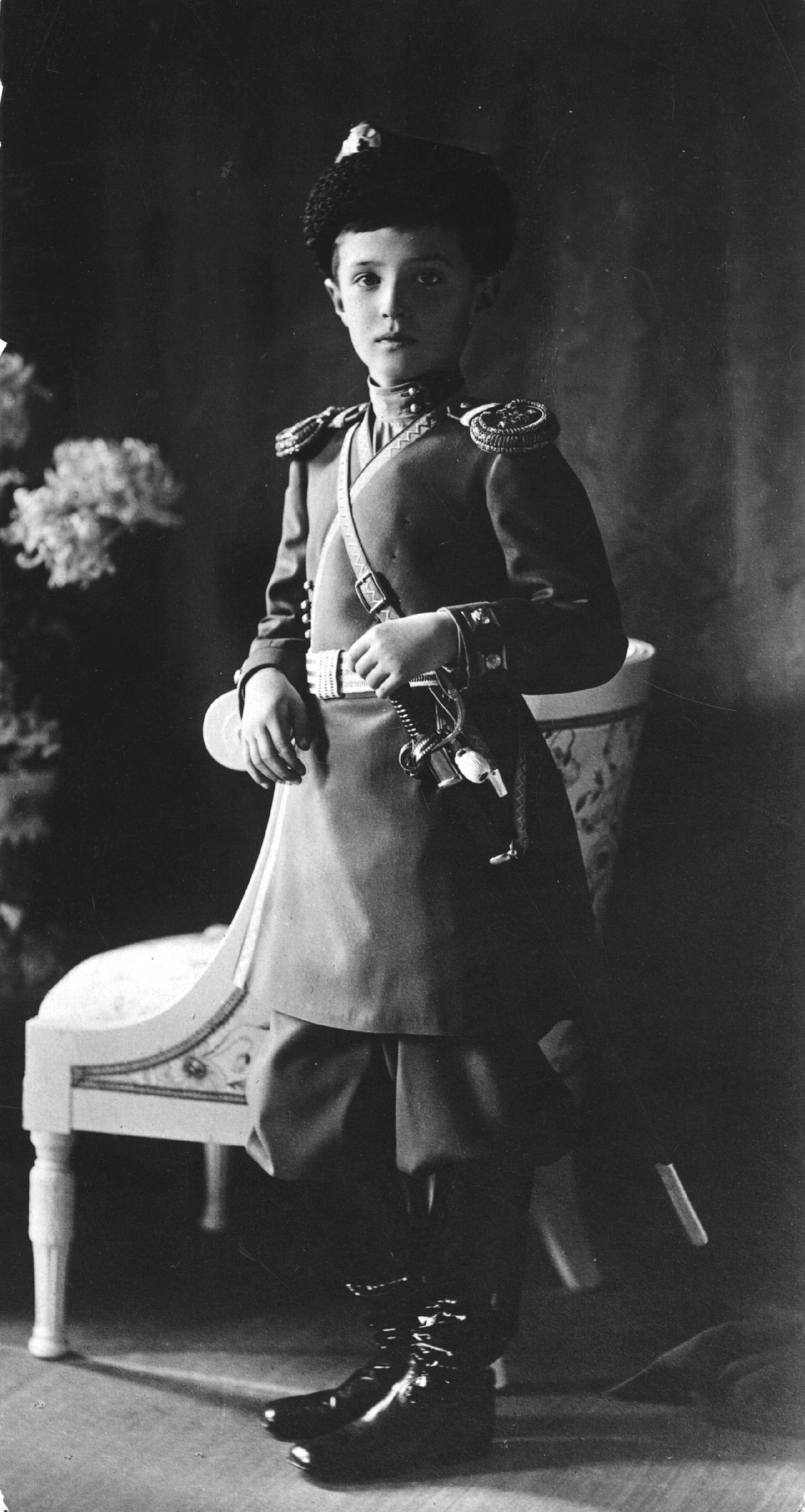
Alexei in uniform of the Jaeger regiment of the Imperial family

During World War I, he lived with his father at army headquarters in Mogilev for long stretches of time and observed military life. Alexei became one of the first Boy Scouts in Russia.

In December 1916, Major-General Sir John Hanbury-Williams, head of the British military at Stavka, received word of the death of his son in action with the British Expeditionary Force in France. Tsar Nicholas sent twelve-year-old Alexei to sit with the grieving father. "Papa told me to come sit with you as he thought you might feel lonely tonight," Alexei told the general. Alexei, like all the Romanov men, grew up wearing sailor uniforms and playing at war from the time he was a toddler. His father began to prepare him for his future role as Tsar by inviting Alexei to sit in on long meetings with government ministers.

==== Stavka ====
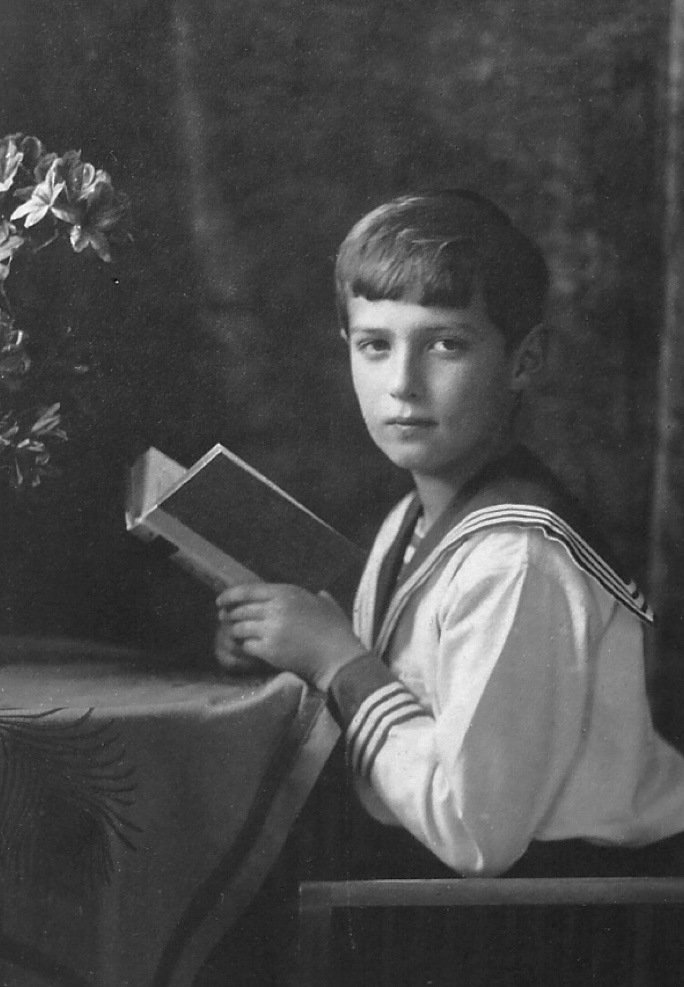
Alexei in 1914

During World War I, Alexei joined his father at Stavka, when his father became the commander-in-chief of the Russian Army in 1915. Alexei seemed to like military life very much and became very playful and energetic. In one of his father's notes to his mother, he said "[I] have come in from the garden with wet sleeves and boots as Alexei sprayed us at the fountain. It is his favorite game [...] peals of laughter ring out. I keep an eye, in order to see that things do not go too far." Alexei even ate the soldiers' black bread and refused when he was offered a meal that he would eat in his palace, saying, "It's not what soldiers eat". In December 1915, Rasputin was invited to see Alexei when the 11-year-old boy was accidentally thrown against the window of a train and his nose began to bleed.

In 1916, he was given the title of lance corporal, of which he was very proud. Alexei's favorites were the foreigners of Belgium, Britain, France, Japan, Italy, and Serbia, and in favor, adopted him as their mascot. Hanbury-Williams, whom Alexei liked, wrote: "As time went on and his shyness wore off, he treated us like old friends and [...] had always some bit of fun with us. With me it was to make sure that each button on my coat was properly fastened, a habit which naturally made me take great care to have one or two unbuttoned, in which case he used to at once to stop and tell me that I was 'untidy again,' give a sigh at my lack of attention to these details and stop and carefully button me up again."

=== Imprisonment of the imperial family ===
The imperial family was arrested following the February Revolution of 1917, which resulted in the abdication of Nicholas II. When he was in captivity at Tobolsk, Alexei complained in his diary that he was "bored" and begged God to have "mercy" on him. He was permitted to play occasionally with Kolya, the son of one of his doctors, and with a kitchen boy named Leonid Sednev.

As he aged, Alexei seemed to tempt fate and injure himself on purpose. While in Siberia, he rode a sled down the stairs of the prison house and injured himself in the groin. The hemorrhage was very bad, and he was so ill that he could not be moved immediately when the Bolsheviks relocated his parents and sister Maria to Yekaterinburg in April 1918. However, neither Nicholas II nor Empress Alexandra mentions anything about a sledding accident in their diaries, and in fact, primary resources such as letters of Empress Alexandra and the diaries of both Nicholas II and Alexandra state that the hemorrhage was caused by a coughing fit. On 30 March (12 April) 1918, Empress Alexandra recorded in her diary: 'Baby stays in bed as fr[om] coughing so hard has a slight haemorrhage in the abdom[en]. Every day from then onwards until her removal to Yekaterinburg, Alexandra recorded Alexei's condition in her diary. Alexei and his three remaining sisters joined the rest of the family weeks later. He was reliant on a wheelchair for the remaining weeks of his life.

=== Death ===
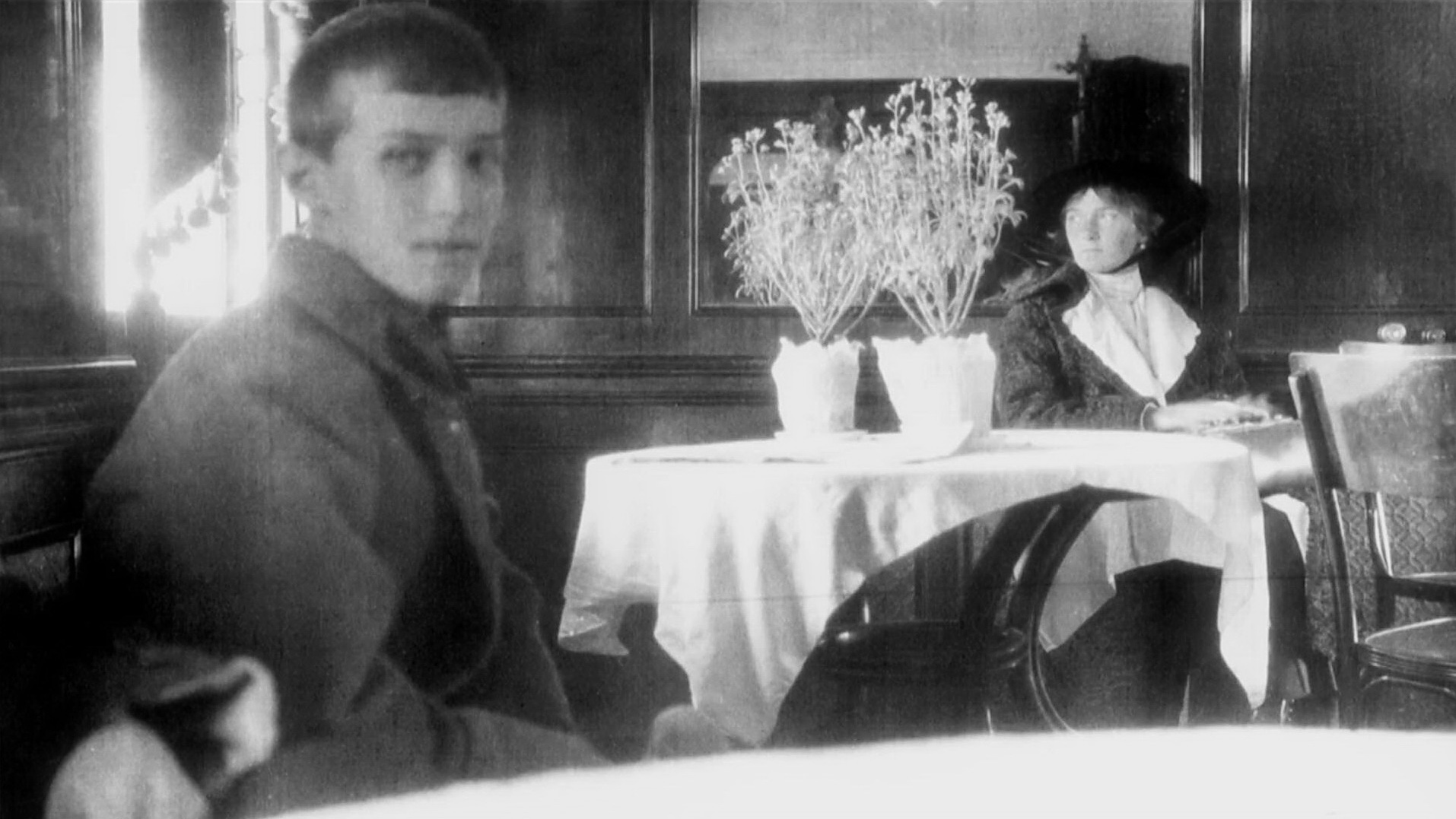
The last known photo of Alexei and sister Olga aboard the steamship Rus that took them to Yekaterinburg in May 1918.

Alexei was murdered on 17 July 1918 aged 13 in the cellar room of the Ipatiev House in Yekaterinburg. The killings were carried out by forces of the Bolshevik secret police under Yakov Yurovsky. According to one account of the execution, the family was told to get up and get dressed in the middle of the night because they were going to be moved. Nicholas II carried Alexei to the cellar room. His mother asked for chairs to be brought so that she and Alexei could sit down. When the family and their servants were settled, Yurovsky announced that they were to be executed. The firing squad first killed Nicholas, the Tsarina, and the two male servants. Alexei remained sitting in the chair, "terrified," before the assassins turned on him and shot at him repeatedly. The boy remained alive and the killers tried to stab him multiple times with bayonets. "Nothing seemed to work," wrote Yurovsky later. "Though injured, he continued to live." Unbeknownst to the killing squad, the Tsarevich's torso was protected by a shirt wrapped in precious gems that he wore beneath his tunic. Finally Yurovsky fired two shots into the boy's head, and he fell silent.

For decades— until all the bodies were found and identified— conspiracy theorists suggested that one or more of the family somehow survived the slaughter. Several people claimed to be surviving members of the Romanov family following the assassinations. People who have pretended to be the Tsarevich include: Alexei Poutziato, Joseph Veres, Heino Tammet, Michael Goleniewski and Vassili Filatov.

== Discovery and identification of remains ==
On 23 August 2007, a Russian archaeologist announced the discovery of two burned, partial skeletons at a bonfire site near Yekaterinburg that appeared to match the site described in Yurovsky's memoirs. The archaeologists said the bones are from a boy who was roughly between the ages of twelve and fifteen years at the time of his death and of a young woman who was roughly between the ages of fifteen and nineteen years old. Anastasia was seventeen years, one month old at the time of the assassination, while Maria was nineteen years, one month old. Alexei was two weeks shy of his fourteenth birthday. Alexei's elder sisters, Olga and Tatiana, were twenty-two and twenty-one years old, respectively, at the time of the assassination. Along with the remains of the two bodies, archaeologists found "shards of a container of sulfuric acid, nails, metal strips from a wooden box, and bullets of various caliber." The bones were found using metal detectors and metal rods as probes. Also, striped material was found that appeared to have been from a blue-and-white striped cloth; Alexei commonly wore a blue-and-white striped undershirt.

On 30 April 2008, Russian forensic scientists announced that DNA testing had proven that the remains belong to the Tsarevich Alexei and the Grand Duchess Maria. DNA information, made public in July 2008, that was obtained from the Yekaterinburg site and repeated independent testing by laboratories such as the University of Massachusetts Medical School revealed that the final two missing Romanov remains were indeed authentic and that the entire Romanov family died in the Ipatiev House. In March 2009, results of the DNA testing were published, confirming that the two bodies discovered in 2007 were those of Tsarevich Alexei and Grand Duchess Maria.

== Appearance and personality ==
Alexei bore a striking resemblance to his mother. His tutor Pierre Gilliard described the 18-month-old Alexei as "one of the handsomest babies one could imagine, with his lovely fair curls and his great blue-grey eyes under their fringe of long curling lashes". A few years later, Gilliard described Alexei as tall for his age, with "a long, finely chiseled face, delicate features, auburn hair with a coppery glint, and large grey-blue eyes like his mother". Baroness Sophie Buxhoeveden, his mother's lady-in-waiting, reflected that "he was a pretty child, tall for his age, with regular features, splendid dark blue eyes with a spark of mischief in them, brown hair, and an upright figure".

=== Personality ===
His tutor Pierre Gilliard wrote that "Alexei was the center of this united family, the focus of all its hopes and affections". Alexei was close with his sisters. Gilliard wrote that they "brought into his life an element of youthful merriment that otherwise would have been sorely missed" and that "His sisters worshipped him. He was his parents' pride and joy. When he was well, the palace was transformed. Everyone and everything in it seemed bathed in sunshine." All four of his sisters were accomplished horsewomen, but he was forbidden from riding.

Alexei's parents indulged his tantrums and mischievous behavior, and they rarely punished him. Nicholas ordered that Alexei be allowed "to do everything that other children of his age were wont to do, and not to restrain him unless it was absolutely necessary". In 1906, Alexei and his family went on a cruise to Finland. In the middle of the night, the 2-year-old Alexei commanded the ship's band to wake up and play for him. Instead of punishing Alexei, Nicholas joked "that's the way to bring up an autocrat!" Nicholas called Alexei "Alexei the Terrible." Olga could not manage Alexei's "peevish temper". The only person he obeyed was his father. Sydney Gibbes noted that "one word [from Nicholas] was always enough to exact implicit obedience from [Alexei]". Sophie Buxhoeveden remembered that Alexei had once thrown her parasol in the river, and Nicholas had chastised Alexei: "That is not the way for a gentleman to behave to a lady. I am ashamed of you, Alexei." After his father scolded him, Alexei was "scarlet in the face" and apologized to her.

Alexei resented that he was forbidden from doing what other boys could do because of his hemophilia. When his mother forbade him to ride a bike and play tennis, he asked angrily, "Why can other boys have everything and I nothing?" Resultantly, Alexei had few friends his age and was often lonely. Alexandra did not allow Alexei to play with his Romanov cousins because she was worried that they would knock him down when playing and he might bleed. Alexei's companions were his sailor-nanny Derevenko's two young sons. Derevenko watched them as they played, and he chastised his children if they played too roughly with Alexei.

Despite his hemophilia, Alexei was adventurous and restless. Doctor Eugene Botkin's children noticed Alexei's inability to "stay in any place or at any game for any length of time". When he was 7, he stole a bicycle and rode it around the palace. Shocked, Nicholas ordered every guard to pursue and capture Alexei. As a small child, Alexei occasionally played pranks on guests. At a formal dinner party, Alexei removed the shoe of a female guest from under the table, and showed it to his father. Nicholas sternly told the boy to return the "trophy", which Alexei did after placing a large ripe strawberry into the toe of the shoe. At a children's party, Alexei began jumping from table to table. When Derevenko tried to stop him, Alexei shouted, "All grown-ups have to go!"

As he aged, Alexei became more thoughtful and considerate. When he was 9, he sent a collection of his favorite jingles to Gleb Botkin, Eugene Botkin's son. He asked Gleb, who was talented at drawing, to illustrate the jingles. He attached a note: "To illustrate and write the jingles under the drawings. Alexei." Before handing the note to Eugene Botkin, he crossed out his signature and explained, "If I send that paper to Gleb with my signature on it, then it would be an order which Gleb would have to obey. But I mean it only as a request and he doesn't have to do it if he doesn't want to." Gilliard eventually convinced Alexei's parents that granting the boy greater autonomy would help him develop better self-control. Alexei took advantage of his unaccustomed freedom, and began to outgrow some of his earlier foibles. Courtiers reported that his illness made him sensitive to the hurts of others.

According to Gilliard, Alexei was a simple, affectionate child, but the court spoiled him by the "servile flattery" of the servants and "silly adulations" of the people around him. Once, a deputation of peasants came to bring presents to Alexei. Derevenko required that they kneel before Alexei. Gilliard remarked that the Tsarevich was "embarrassed and blushed violently", and when asked if he liked seeing people on their knees before him, he said, "Oh no, but Derevenko says it must be so!". When Gilliard encouraged Alexei to "stop Derevenko insisting on it", he said that he "dare not". When Gilliard took the matter up with Derevenko, he said that Alexei was "delighted to be freed from this irksome formality".

Due to his disease, Alexei understood that he might not live to adulthood. When he was ten, his older sister Olga found him lying on his back looking at the clouds and asked him what he was doing. "I like to think and wonder", Alexei replied. Olga asked him what he liked to think about. "Oh, so many things", the boy responded. "I enjoy the sun and the beauty of summer as long as I can. Who knows whether one of these days I shall not be prevented from doing it?"

Alexei enjoyed playing the balalaika. His favorite pet was a spaniel named Joy, a dog who, even after Alexei's death, was faithful towards him. He also had an old performing donkey named Vanka, given to him by Tsar Nicholas. Alexei gave sugar cubes to Vanka, and Vanka pulled Alexei around the park in a sled during the winter.

=== Political involvement ===
Alexei was proud of and enjoyed his position as Tsarevich. Buxhoeveden reflected that "he knew and felt that he was the Tsarevich, and from babyhood mechanically took his place in front of his elder sisters". He liked being kissed on the hand by the officers and "didn't miss his chance to boast about it and give himself airs in front of his sisters". He enjoyed jumping in front of the guards at the front of the Alexander Palace, who would immediately salute him as he walked past. Nicholas forbade the guards to salute Alexei unless another member of the family accompanied him. Alexei was embarrassed "when the salute failed him", which "marked his first taste of discipline". On one occasion, he ordered all of the Finnish officers on various ships to stand before him on the deck of the Standart. He began commanding them, but the Finnish officers did not understand Russian and stood in confusion until an aide informed them that Alexei wanted to hear them say, "We wish you health, your Imperial Highness." When he was told that a group of officers had arrived to call on him, the 6-year-old Alexei told his sisters, "Now girls, run away. I am busy. Someone has just called to see me on business." Also at 6, he walked into his father's study and saw the Foreign Minister Alexander Izvolsky waiting to see Nicholas. Izvolsky remained sitting, and Alexei screamed, "When the heir to the Russian Throne enters a room, people must get up!"

Alexei loved to attend army inspections with his father. When he was 3, he wore a miniature army uniform and played with a toy wooden rifle. From birth, he had the title of "Hetman of all the Cossacks." He wore a miniature uniform of a sailor of the Russian navy, and he had his own Cossack uniform with a fur cap, boots, and dagger. He ended his daily prayers with "Hurrah!" instead of "amen". When asked why, he replied that the soldiers on parade always said "Hurrah!" when his father finished speaking, so he should greet his Heavenly Father in the same way. Before he understood the nature of his disease, he said that he wanted to be a warrior-tsar and lead armies as his ancestors had.

Nicholas's Colonel Mordinov remembered Alexei:

He had what we Russians usually call "a golden heart". He easily felt an attachment to people, he liked them and tried to do his best to help them, especially when it seemed to him that someone was unjustly hurt. His love, like that of his parents, was based mainly on pity. Tsarevich Alexei Nikolaevich was an awfully lazy, but very capable boy (I think, he was lazy precisely because he was capable), he easily grasped everything, he was thoughtful and keen beyond his years ... Despite his good nature and compassion, he undoubtedly promised to possess a firm and independent character in the future.

== Sainthood ==
Saint Alexei Romanov
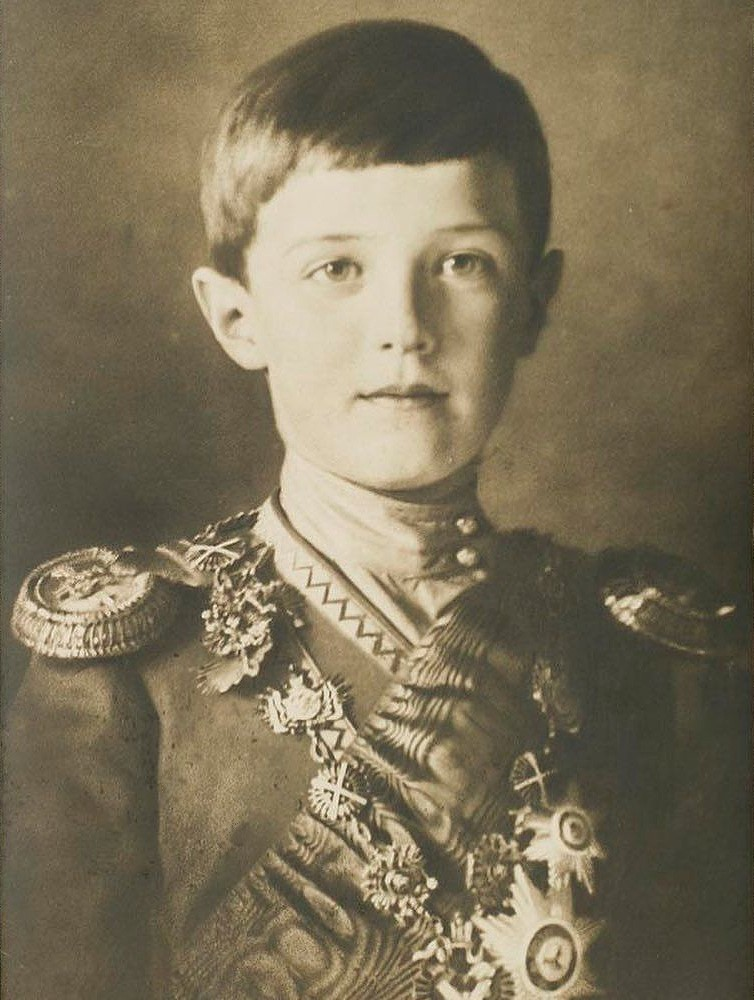

Tsesarevich and Passion bearer (Note: Alexei and the other Romanov saints are considered martyrs by the Russian Orthodox Church Outside of Russia)
- Venerated in: Eastern Orthodox Church
- Canonized: 1981 by Russian Orthodox Church Abroad; 2000 by Russian Orthodox Church
- Major shrine: Church on Blood, Yekaterinburg, Russia
- Feast: 17 July

The Romanov family had been canonized as holy martyrs in 1981 by the Russian Orthodox Church Abroad, which had developed among emigres after the Russian Revolution and the World Wars. After the decline of the Soviet Union, the government of Russia agreed with the Russian Orthodox Church to have the bodies of Tsar Nicholas II, Tsarina Alexandra, and three of their daughters (which were found at the execution site) interred at St. Peter and Paul Cathedral in St. Petersburg on 17 July 1998, eighty years after they were executed. In 2000, Alexei and his family were canonized as passion bearers by the Russian Orthodox Church.

As noted, the remains of Alexei and one of his sisters' bodies were found in 2008. As of 2015, Alexei's remains had not yet been interred with the rest of his family, as the Russian Orthodox Church has requested more DNA testing to ensure that his identity was confirmed.

== Historical significance ==
Alexei was the heir apparent to the Romanov Throne. Paul I had passed laws forbidding women to succeed to the throne (unless there were no legitimate male dynasts left, in which case, the throne would pass to the closest female relative of the last Tsar). He had established this rule in revenge for what he perceived to have been the illegal behavior of his mother, Catherine II ("the Great"), in deposing his father Peter III.

Nicholas II was forced to abdicate on 15 March [O.S. 2 March] 1917. He did this in favour of his twelve-year-old son Alexei, who ascended the throne under a regency. Nicholas later decided to alter his original abdication. Whether that act had any legal validity is open to speculation. Nicholas consulted with doctors and others and realised that he would have to be separated from Alexei if he abdicated in favour of his son. Not wanting Alexei to be parted from the family in this crisis, Nicholas altered the abdication document in favour of his younger brother Grand Duke Michael Alexandrovich of Russia. After receiving advice about whether his personal security could be guaranteed, Michael declined to accept the throne without the people's approval through an election held by the proposed Constituent Assembly. No such referendum was ever held.

Grigori Rasputin rose in political power because the Tsarina believed that he could heal Alexei's hemophilia, or his attacks. Rasputin advised the Tsar that the Great War would be won once he (Tsar Nicholas II) took command of the Russian Army. Following this advice was a serious mistake, as the Tsar had no military experience. The Tsarina, Alexandra, a deeply religious woman, came to rely upon Rasputin and believe in his ability to help Alexei where conventional doctors had failed. Historian Robert K. Massie explored this theme in his book, Nicholas and Alexandra.

Massie contends that caring for Alexei seriously diverted the attention of his father, Nicholas II, and the rest of the Romanovs from the business of war and government.

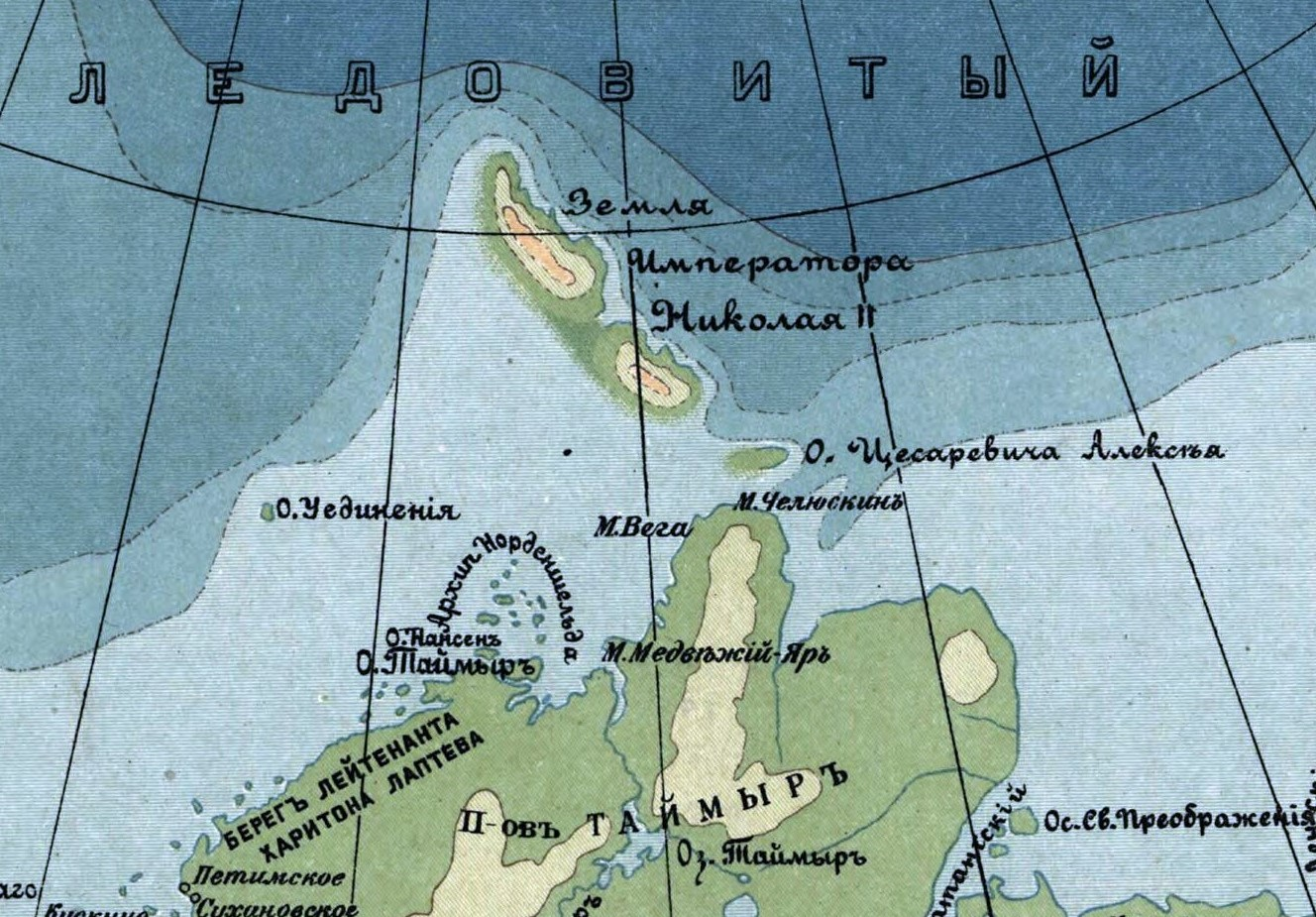
Tsesarevich Alexei Island southeast of Emperor Nicholas II Land in a 1915 map of the Russian Empire.

Tsarevich Alexei Island (Russian: Остров Цесаревича Алексея), later renamed Maly Taymyr, was named in honour of Alexei by the 1913 Arctic Ocean Hydrographic Expedition led by Boris Vilkitsky on behalf of the Russian Hydrographic Service.

== Honours ==
- Russian Empire:
  - Knight of the Imperial Order of Saint Andrew the Apostle the First-called, 11 August 1904
  - Knight of the Imperial Order of Saint Alexander Nevsky, 11 August 1904
  - Knight of the Imperial Order of the White Eagle, 11 August 1904
  - Knight of the Imperial Order of Saint Anna, 1st Class, 11 August 1904
  - Knight of the Imperial Order of Saint Stanislaus, 1st Class, 11 August 1904
  - George Medal, 4th Class, 17 October 1915
- France: Grand Cross of the National Order of the Legion of Honour, 8 July 1914
- Sweden: Knight of the Royal Order of the Seraphim, 27 June 1909
- Kingdom of Italy: Knight of the Supreme Order of the Most Holy Annunciation, 25 October 1909
- Qing dynasty: Imperial Order of the Double Dragon

== Archives ==
Alexei's diary, which was presumably kept by his tutors and relates his daily activities for January and February 1917, is written in both French and English and is preserved in the "Grand Duchess Kseniia Aleksandrovna Papers" collection in the Hoover Institution Archives (Stanford, California, USA).

== The royal haemophilia line ==
Haemophilia in European royalty

Queen Victoria; Xx	Albert; XY
Victoria; X?	Edward VII; XY	Alice; Xx	Louis IV; XY	Alfred; XY	Helena; X?	Louise; X?	Arthur; XY	Leopold xY	Helen; XX	Beatrice; Xx	Henry; XY
Victoria; X?	Elisabeth; X?	Irene; Xx	Henry; XY	Ernest Louis; XY	Frederick xY	Alix; Xx	Nicholas II; XY	Alice; Xx	Alexander; XY
Waldemar xY	Sigismund; XY	Henry xY	Olga; XX?	Tatiana; XX?	Maria; Xx?	Anastasia; Xx?	Alexei xY
May; X?	Rupert xY	Maurice; XY
Alexander; XY	Victoria Eugenie; Xx	Alfonso XIII; XY	Leopold xY	Maurice; XY
Alfonso xY	Jaime; XY	Beatriz; X?	Maria Cristina; X?	Juan; XY	Gonzalo xY

Legend: X – unaffected X chromosome; x – affected X chromosome; Y – Y chromosome; ? - unknown carrier status
Source: Aronova-Tiuntseva, Yelena; Herreid, Clyde Freeman (20 September 2003). "Hemophilia: 'The Royal Disease'" (PDF). SciLinks. National Science Teachers Association. p. 7. Archived from the original (PDF) on 10 January 2018.

== Notes ==
Alexei Nikolaevich, Tsarevich of Russia House of Romanov Born: 30 July 1904 Died: 17 July 1918
Russian royalty
Preceded by Michael Alexandrovich as heir presumptive	Tsesarevich of Russia; 12 August 1904 – 15 March 1917	Monarchy abolished
Titles in pretence
Preceded by Nicholas II	— TITULAR — Emperor of Russia; 15 March 1917^{1} – 17 July 1918; Reason for succession failure: Empire abolished in 1917	Succeeded by Kirill Vladimirovich
