= Bruce Conde =

US Army officer

- Born: Bruce Chalmers; December 5, 1913; San Juan Capistrano, California
- Died: July 20, 1992 (aged 78); Morocco
- Other names: Bruce Alfonso de Bourbon, Prince of Condé
- Education: UCLA
- Spouse: Beatrice Dolgorouky
- Military career
- Allegiance: United States; Kingdom of Yemen
- Branch: (United States) US Army
- Rank: General
- Unit: (United States) 82nd Airborne Division
- Conflicts: World War II: North African campaign; North Yemen Civil War

Bruce Conde (akas: Bruce Alfonso de Bourbon, Prince of Condé, Alfonso Yorba, and Hajji Abdurrahman; born December 5, 1913 – died July 20, 1992) was a US Army officer, stamp collector, royal imposter, and a general for Royalist forces during the North Yemen Civil War.

== Early years ==
Born Bruce Chalmers in San Juan Capistrano, California, Chalmers was orphaned and put up for adoption. As a young boy, he was an avid stamp collector, and wrote to the King of Yemen, asking for local postage stamps for his collection. His reply came from the Imam's young son, Muhammad al-Badr, which started a lifelong friendship between the two.

== Military service ==
After studying Spanish at UCLA, he joined the US Army, serving in the 82nd Airborne in North Africa during the Second World War. He was later posted to Japan where he studied Japanese, but his true passion remained the Arab world. Following his discharge from the army, he moved to Beirut to study Arabic with the assistance of the G.I. Bill. He changed his name to Conde, his grandmother's family name, and claimed to be descended from the French royal family, even though the House of Bourbon-Condé became extinct in 1830.

== Yemen ==
As his correspondence with Muhammad al-Badr continued, he received an invitation to visit the country. After relocating to Sana'a, Yemen, Conde renounced American citizenship and converted to Islam in 1958.

He was granted Yemeni citizenship and a passport. Conde convinced the Imam that Yemen could make money selling postage stamps to collectors and was placed in charge of the country's philatelic office, which eventually caused some friction between Conde and the Minister of Communications. Conde was accused of espionage and expelled from the country and his passport revoked. Without travel documents, he spent three weeks in the Cairo Airport before moving to Beirut, Lebanon where he became a correspondent for Linn's Stamp News. He published a limited number of books about coastal cities such as Byblos and Tripoli.

== Sharjah ==
Conde eventually found himself invited to the tiny emirate of Sharjah, where he established a post office and again taught the country how to generate revenue from the sale of postage stamps to collectors. In gratitude, the government of Sharjah reportedly issued him a passport.

== North Yemen Civil War ==
Following the overthrow of the Imam of Yemen in 1962, Conde returned to Yemen and enlisted with Royalist forces in the North Yemen Civil War. He eventually rose to the rank of General, while in the meantime overseeing the production of Royalist Yemen postage stamps, which helped to raise funds for the cause. He now called himself H.S.H. Abdurraham B.A. de Bourbon, Prince of Condé, claiming his royal lineage had been recognized and "reinstated" by the Yemeni Royal Family. Despite serving bravely in the war, the Imam's forces collapsed in 1970, and Conde moved to Spain, and then to Morocco in 1980.

== Post-war years ==
During the 1980s, he ceased writing for Linn's Stamp News, and wrote instead for Stamp Collector newspaper, owned by Capital Cities/ABC, Inc.

In 1984 Conde married Beatrice Dolgorouky, who claimed to have been descended from the Russian/Ukrainian royal families. He adopted her son, Alexis Brimeyer, who spent a lifetime attempting to prove his alleged connection to European royalty.

Having given up his US citizenship many years before, Conde eventually found himself once again stateless, without a passport, and unable to leave Morocco. He died there on July 20, 1992.

== See also ==
- North Yemen Civil War
- Mutawakkilite Kingdom of Yemen
- Muhammad al-Badr
- Alexis Brimeyer
- Louis Henry II, Prince of Condé

== Sources ==
- Schmidt, Dana Adams Yemen: The Unknown War (London: Bodley Head, 1968), 316 pages.
