= North Yemen civil war =

1962–1970 conflict

- Part of the Arab Cold War
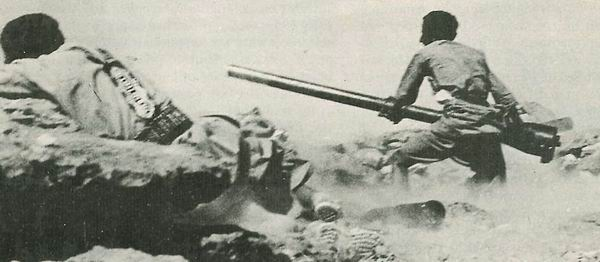
- Royalist Yemeni forces attempt to repel an Egyptian armored attack
Date	26 September 1962 – 1 December 1970 (8 years, 2 months and 5 days)
Location	North Yemen (with spillovers into Saudi Arabia)
Result	Republican victory

Belligerents
Kingdom of Yemen; Saudi Arabia	Yemen Arab Republic; Egypt

Commanders and leaders
Muhammad al-Badr; Hassan ibn Yahya; Mohamed bin Hussein; Abdullah bin Hassan (Saudi Arabia) Faisal bin Abdulaziz	Abdullah al-Sallal; Abdul Rahman al-Eryani; Hassan al-Amri; Gamal Abdel Nasser # Anwar Sadat

Strength
1965: 20,000 semi-regulars 200,000 tribesmen	1964: 3,000 soldiers 1967: 130,000 soldiers

Casualties and losses
Unknown; 1,000 dead	Unknown; 15,194–26,000 dead (Note: The official death toll is 15,194, other sources reported up to 26,000 deaths)
- 100,000–200,000 killed overall

The North Yemen civil war, also known in Yemen as the 26 September Revolution, (Note: Arabic: ثورة 26 سبتمبر, romanized: Thawrat 26 Sibtambar) was a civil war fought in North Yemen from 1962 to 1970 between partisans of the Mutawakkilite Kingdom and supporters of the Yemen Arab Republic. The war began with a coup d'état carried out in 1962 by revolutionary republicans led by the army under the command of Abdullah al-Sallal. He dethroned the newly crowned King and Imam Muhammad al-Badr and declared Yemen a republic under his presidency. His government abolished slavery in Yemen. The Imam escaped to the Saudi Arabian border where he rallied popular support from northern Zaydi tribes to retake power, and the conflict rapidly escalated to a full-scale civil war.

On the royalist side, Jordan, Saudi Arabia, and Israel supplied military aid, and Britain offered covert support. The republicans were supported by Egypt (then formally known as the United Arab Republic or UAR) and were supplied warplanes from the Soviet Union. Both foreign irregular and conventional forces were also involved. Egyptian President Gamal Abdel Nasser supported the republicans with as many as 70,000 Egyptian troops and weapons. Despite several military actions and peace conferences, the war sank into a stalemate by the mid-1960s. Egypt's commitment to the war is considered to have been detrimental to its performance in the June 1967 Six-Day War against Israel. Once the Six-Day War began, Nasser found it increasingly difficult to maintain his army's involvement in Yemen and began to pull out his forces. The surprising removal of Sallal on November 5 by Yemeni dissidents, who were supported by republican tribesmen, resulted in an internal shift of power in the capital, as the royalists were approaching from the north.

The new republican government was headed by Abdul Rahman al-Eryani, Ahmed Noman, and Mohamed Ali Uthman, all of whom promptly resigned or fled the country. The capital was left under the control of Prime Minister Hassan al-Amri. The 1967 siege of Sana'a became the turning point of the war. The remaining republican Prime Minister succeeded in keeping control of Sana'a and, by February 1968, the royalists lifted the siege. Clashes continued in parallel with peace talks until 1970, when Saudi Arabia recognized the Republic and a ceasefire came into effect.

Egyptian military historians refer to the war in Yemen as their "Vietnam [War]". Historian Michael Oren (former Israeli Ambassador to the U.S.) later wrote that Egypt's military adventure in Yemen was so disastrous that the United States' actions in the continuing Vietnam War could easily have been dubbed "America's Yemen".

== Background ==
=== Yemen ===
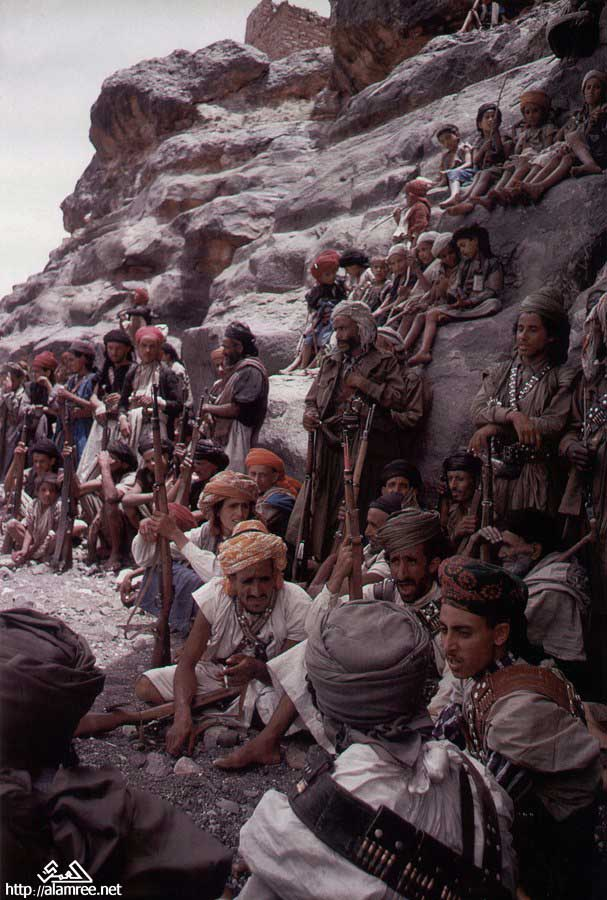
Yemeni tribesmen who supported al-Badr

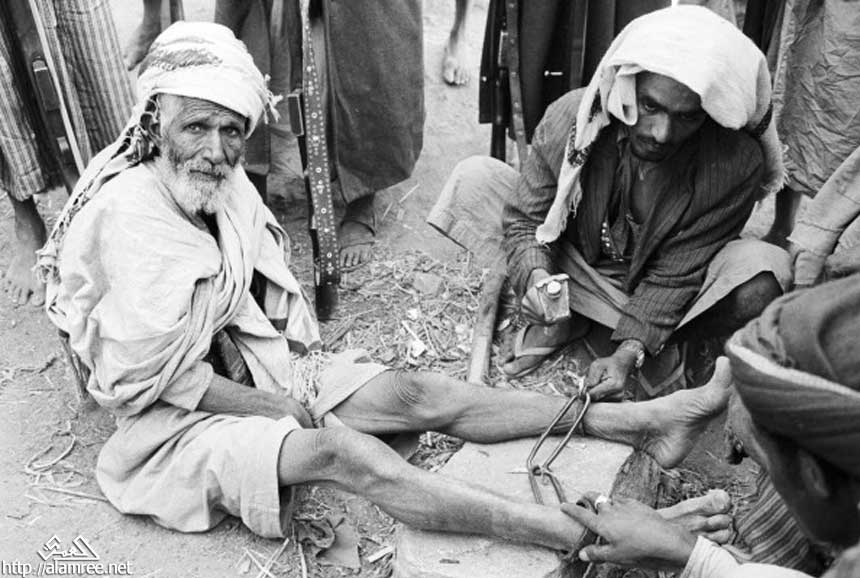
Yemeni tribesman being held as a hostage by al-Badr's forces

Imam Ahmad bin Yahya inherited the Yemeni throne in 1948. In 1955, Iraq-trained Colonel Ahmad Thalaya led a revolt against him. A group of soldiers under his command surrounded the royal palace of Al Urdhi at Taiz—a fortified stronghold where the Imam lived with his harem, that also housed the royal treasure, an arsenal of modern weapons, and a contingent of 150 palace guards—and demanded that Ahmad abdicate. Ahmad agreed, but demanded that his son, Muhammad al-Badr, succeed him. Thalaya refused, preferring the king's half-brother, the Emir Saif el Islam Abdullah, the 48-year-old foreign minister. While Abdullah began forming a new government, Ahmad opened the country's coffers and secretly began buying off the Thalaya's soldiers. After five days, the number of soldiers besieging the palace was reduced from 600 to 40. Ahmad then came out of the palace, wearing a devil's mask and wielding a long scimitar, terrifying the besiegers. He slashed two sentries dead before exchanging the sword for a sub-machine gun and leading his 150 guards onto the roof of the palace to begin a direct attack on the rebels. After 28 hours, 23 rebels and 1 palace guard were dead, and Thalaya gave up. Abdullah was later reported executed, and Thalaya was publicly decapitated.

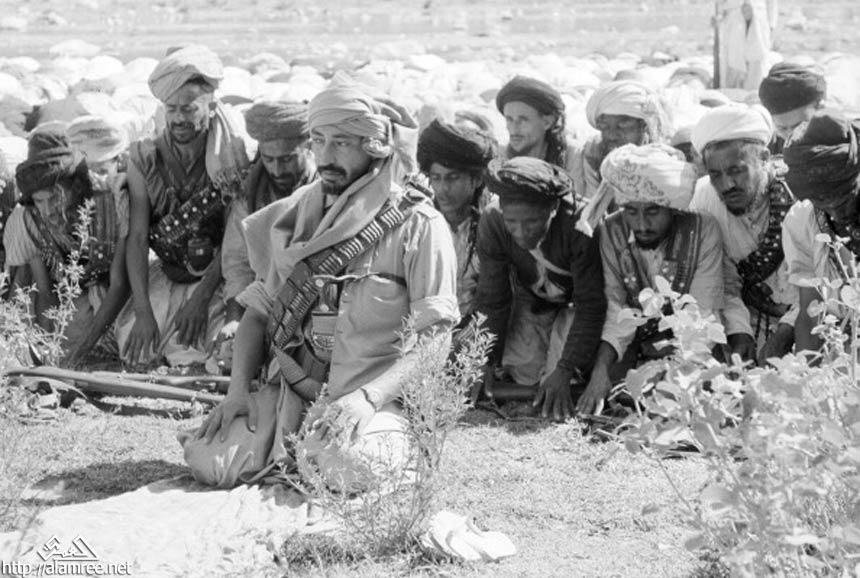
Muhammad al-Badr praying with his guards

In March 1958, al-Badr arrived in Damascus to tell President Nasser of Yemen's adherence to the United Arab Republic (UAR). However, Ahmad was to keep his throne and his absolute power, and the arrangement constituted only a close alliance. In 1959, Ahmad went to Rome for treatment of his arthritis, rheumatism, heart trouble and, reportedly, drug addiction. Fights erupted between tribal chieftains, and al-Badr unsuccessfully tried to buy off the dissidents by promising "reforms", including the appointment of a representative council, more army pay, and promotions. Upon his return, Ahmad swore to crush the "agents of the Christians". He ordered the decapitation of one of his subjects and the amputation of the left hand and right foot of 15 others as punishment for the murder of a high official the previous June. Al-Badr was only rebuked for his leniency, but the Yemeni radio stopped broadcasting army officers' speeches, and talks of reforms were silenced.

In June 1961, Ahmad was still recovering from an assassination attempted four months prior, and moved out of the capital, Taiz, into the pleasure palace of Sala. Defense and foreign minister, Badr became acting prime minister and interior minister. Despite being crown prince, al-Badr still needed the Ulema in San'a to ratify him. Al-Badr was not popular with the Ulema due to his association with Nasser, and the Ulema had refused Ahmad's request to ratify Badr's title. Imam Ahmad died on September 19, 1962, and was succeeded by his son, Muhammad al-Badr. One of al-Badr's first acts was to appoint Colonel Abdullah Sallal, a known socialist and Nasserist, as commander of the palace guard.

=== Egypt ===
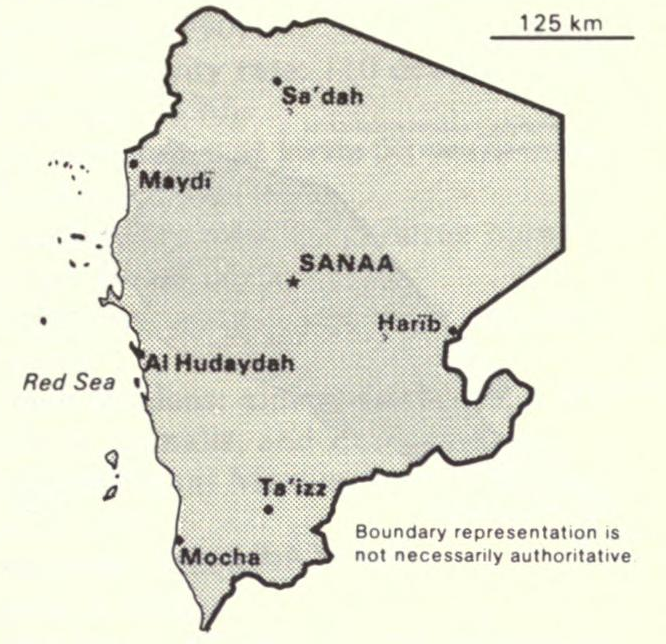
Map of North Yemen

Nasser had looked to a regime change in Yemen since 1957 and finally put his desires into practice in January 1962 by giving the Free Yemen Movement office space, financial support, and radio airtime. Anthony Nutting's biography of Nasser identifies several factors that led the Egyptian president to send expeditionary forces to Yemen, including the unraveling of the union with Syria in 1961, which dissolved his UAR in all but name, damaging Nasser's prestige. A quick, decisive victory in Yemen could help him recover leadership of the Arab world. Nasser was also keen to maintain his reputation as an Arab nationalist, setting his sights on expelling British forces from South Yemen, including Britain's presence in the strategic port city of Aden.

Mohamed Heikal, a chronicler of Egyptian national policy and decision making, and confidant of Nasser, wrote in For Egypt Not For Nasser, that he had engaged Nasser on the subject of supporting the coup in Yemen. Heikal argued that Sallal's revolution could not absorb the massive number of Egyptian personnel who would arrive in Yemen to prop up his regime, and that it would be wise to consider sending Arab nationalist volunteers from throughout the Middle East to fight alongside the republican Yemeni forces, suggesting the Spanish Civil War as a template from which to conduct events in Yemen. Nasser refused Heikal's ideas, insisting on the need to protect the Arab nationalist movement. Nasser was convinced that a regiment of Egyptian Special Forces and a wing of fighter-bombers would be able to secure the Yemeni republican coup d'état.

Nasser's considerations for sending troops to Yemen may have included the following:

1. Impact of his support to the Algerian War of Independence from 1954 to 1962
2. Syria leaving Nasser's UAR in 1961
3. Taking advantage of a breach in British and French relations, which had been strained by Nasser's support for the FLN in Algeria, and primarily as an effort to undermine the Central Treaty Organization (CENTO), which caused the downfall of the Iraqi monarchy in 1958
4. Confronting imperialism, which Nasser saw as Egypt's destiny
5. Guaranteeing dominance of the Red Sea from the Suez Canal to the Bab-el-Mandeb strait
6. Retribution against the Saudi royal family, whom Nasser felt had undermined his union with Syria.

== History ==
=== Coup d'état ===
==== Plot ====
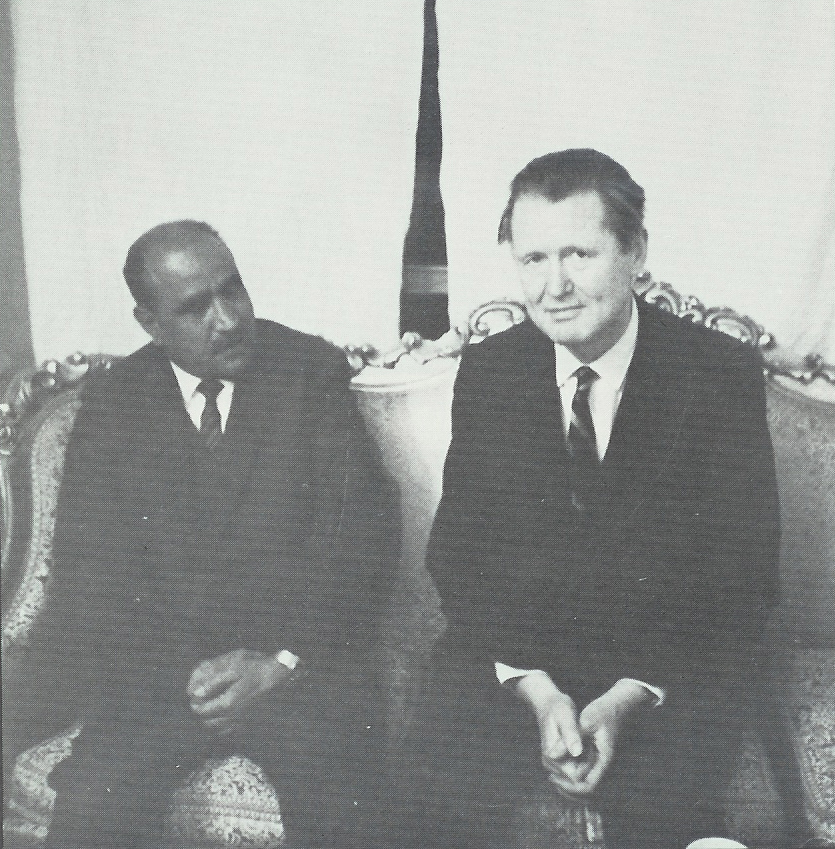
Author Dana Adams Schmidt with President Sallal, March 1967

At least four plots were going on in San'a. One was headed by Lieutenant Ali Abdul al Moghny. Another one was conceived by Sallal. His plot merged into a third conspiracy prodded by the Hashid tribal confederation in revenge for Ahmad's execution of their paramount sheik and his son. A fourth plot was shaped by several young princes who sought to get rid of Badr but not the imamate. The only men who knew about those plots were the Egyptian chargé d'affaires, Abdul Wahad, and Badr himself. The day after Ahmad's death, Badr's minister in London, Ahmad al Shami, sent him a telegram urging him not to go to San'a to attend his father's funeral because several Egyptian officers, as well as some of his own, were plotting against him. Badr's private secretary did not pass this message to him, pretending he did not understand the code. Badr may have been saved by the gathering of thousands of men at the funeral. Badr learned of the telegram only later.

A day before the coup Badr was warned by Wahad, who claimed to have information from the Egyptian intelligence service. He warned Badr that Sallal and fifteen other officers, including Moghny, were planning a revolution. Wahad's purpose was to cover himself and Egypt in case the coup failed, to prompt the plotters into immediate action, and drive Sallal and Moghny into a single conspiracy. Sallal got imamic permission to bring in the armed forces. Then, Wahad went to Moghny, and told him that Badr had somehow discovered the plot, and that he must act immediately before the other officers are arrested. He told him that if he could hold San'a, the radio and the airport for three days, the whole of Europe would recognize him.

Sallal ordered that the military academy in San'a go on full alert - opening all armories and issuing weapons to all junior officers and troops. On the evening of September 25, Sallal gathered known leaders of the Yemeni nationalist movement and other officers who had sympathized or participated in the military protests of 1955. Each officer and cell would be given orders and would commence as soon as the shelling of Badr's palace began. Key areas that would be secured included Al-Bashaer palace (Badr's palace); Al-Wusul palace (Reception area for dignitaries); The radio station; The telephone exchange; Qasr al-Silaah (The Main Armory); and The central security headquarters (Intelligence and Internal Security).

==== Execution ====
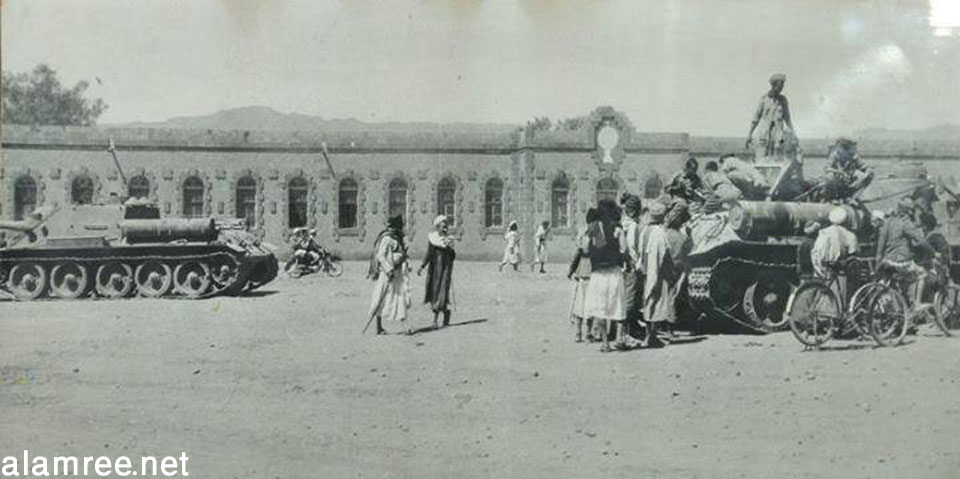
Tanks and troops that carried out the coup.

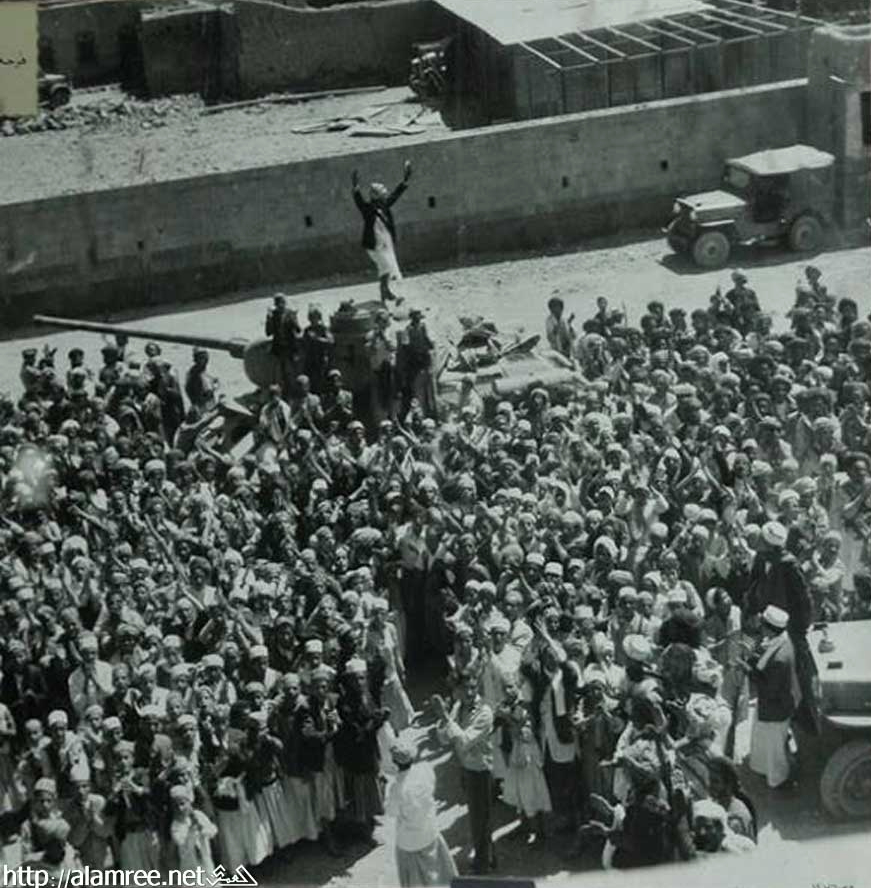
A tank of the coup participants next to a jubilant crowd.

At 10:30 p.m., al-Badr heard tanks moving through the nearby streets and reckoned that they were the ones Sallal had asked to move. At 11.45 p.m., the army began shelling the palace. Al-Badr seized a machine gun and began firing at the tanks, although they were out of range. Moghny sent an armored car to Sallal's house and invited him to the headquarters, where he asked him to join the revolution. Sallal agreed on condition that he would become president. Moghny assented. The coup d'état was carried out with thirteen tanks from the Badr Brigade, six armored cars, two mobile artillery cannons, and two anti-air guns. Command and control of the forces loyal to the coup took place at the Military Academy. A unit of revolutionary officers accompanied by tanks headed towards Al-Bashaer Palace. By megaphone, they voiced an appeal to the imamate guard for tribal solidarity and to surrender Muhammad al-Badr, who would be sent peacefully into exile. The imamate guard refused to surrender and opened fire, prompting the revolutionary leaders to respond with tank and artillery shells. The rebels planned to deploy tanks and artillery in the coup.

The battle at the palace continued until guards surrendered to the revolutionaries the following morning. The radio station was first to fall, secured after a loyalist officer was killed and resistance collapsed. The armory was perhaps the easiest target, as a written order from Sallal was sufficient to open the storage facility, beat the royalists, and secure rifles, artillery, and ammunition for the revolutionaries. The telephone exchange likewise fell without any resistance. At the Al-Wusul Palace, revolutionary units remained secure under the guise of granting and protecting diplomats and dignitaries staying there to greet the new imam of Yemen. By late morning on September 26, all areas of San'a were secure and the radio broadcast that Muhammad al-Badr had been overthrown by the new revolutionary government in power. Revolutionary cells in the cities of Taiz, Al-Hujja and the port city of Hodeida then began securing arsenals, airports, and port facilities.

==== Coup aftermath ====
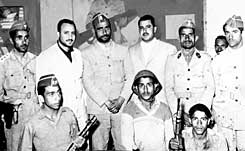
Abdullah Sallal (center) and the heads of the coup in October 1962

Al-Badr and his personal servants managed to escape through a door in the garden wall in the back of the palace. Because of the curfew, they had to avoid the main streets. They decided to escape individually and meet in the village of Gabi al-Kaflir, where they were reunited after a 45-minute walk. Sallal had to defeat a fellow revolutionary, Al-Baidani, an intellectual who had a doctorate degree, who did not share Nasser's vision. On September 28, there were radio broadcasts announcing al-Badr's death. Sallal gathered tribesmen in San'a and proclaimed: "The corrupt monarchy which ruled for a thousand years was a disgrace to the Arab nation and to all humanity. Anyone who tries to restore it is an enemy of God and man!" By then, he had learned that al-Badr was still alive and had made his way to Saudi Arabia.

Egyptian General Ali Abdul Hameed was dispatched by plane, and arrived in Yemen on September 29 to assess the situation and needs of the Yemeni Revolutionary Command Council. Egypt sent a battalion of Special Forces (Saaqah) on a mission to act as personal guards for Sallal. They arrived at Hodeida on October 5. Fifteen days after leaving San'a, al-Badr sent a man ahead to Saudi Arabia to announce that he was alive. He then went there himself, crossing the border near Khobar, at the north-eastern edge of the kingdom.

=== Criticism of post-revolutionary executions ===
According to several Yemeni accounts, the first days of the revolution saw a wave of arrests and executions without trial that targeted not only former officials but also members of the Hamid al-Din families and other civilians who surrendered voluntarily. Judge Abd al-Rahman al-Eryani, who later became president of the Yemen Arab Republic, criticised these executions in his memoirs, warning that they would fuel a counter revolution. He wrote that he had telegraphed al Sallal to say that he held himself innocent before God of every drop of blood shed without right, and that each such execution added fuel for the royalist cause.

According to the memoirs of the participants, a list of individuals was drawn up for arrest on the first night of the revolution. Among those detained were the head of the Court of Appeal, Yahya Muhammad al-Shahari, as well as Zaid Uqbat, Abd al Samad Abu Talib, and Muhammad Salih al Alfi. Other figures, including Sayf al Islam Ali (the Imam's brother), Sayf al Islam Ismail (another brother), and al Hasan bin Ali (the Imam's cousin), were brought from their homes and executed.

The first revolutionary statement had declared as its first principle the "elimination of the Imamate and its supporters". Some revolutionaries interpreted this literally. According to one participant, opponents converged on that first goal, but for many the other goals meant nothing; they wanted victory over the Hamid al-Din family either out of revenge or for personal gain.

Dr. Muhammad Abdul Malik al-Mutawakkil, who was in Aden at the time, later refused to return to Sana'a after hearing radio announcements of executions. He stated: "They sentenced us to death because of our family name or identity. This is not a national revolution."

Some authors argue that many members of Hamid al-Din families were not royalists in the sense of collaborating against the revolution; some had even participated in earlier opposition movements against the Imamate, including the 1948 coup and opposition to Imam Ahmad. However, according to some accounts, their opposition was met with suspicion and was interpreted as an attempt to regain family influence rather than sincere support for the revolution.

Brigadier Hadi Issa became known as an executioner during the first weeks of the revolution. According to participant memoirs, he did not act alone, but his role grew, and within a month his name was widely associated with carrying out executions. He was himself executed without trial in 1966 on charges of spying for Israel.

Abd al-Rahman al-Baydani, who became Vice President, criticised the executions. He wrote that he had been disturbed by news from Sana'a that some officers, having lost control after the revolution, had hastened to execute about twenty prominent Yemenis without justification or trial, some of whom could have served the republic. Al-Baydani explicitly accused Abdullah Juzaylan of having participated in or ordered these executions. He wrote that the ghosts of the twenty executed men haunted Juzaylan day and night, and that Juzaylan himself had killed his friend al-Hasan bin Ali, who had begged for mercy while tied in the execution square.

According to al-Baydani, Juzaylan's own memoirs confirm the killing of the head of the Court of Appeal and his son at al-Sallal's command, without trial. Juzaylan described the scene: the head of the Court of Appeal was brought before al-Sallal, who ordered him shot. The son tried to flee and was also killed.

One participant described witnessing the bodies of five executed men in the artillery garage, stating that he was deeply affected by the manner of execution, that those individuals had not been tried, and that some did not deserve execution. He said the event had a negative impact on the reputation and justice of the revolution.

Hussein al-Muqaddami, another participant, wrote that when Sana'a Radio announced the names of executed persons, many revolutionaries were dismayed by the haste of the executions without trial. He noted that some of those executed did not deserve execution in the first place, and that the revolutionaries had criticised the Imam for haste and excess in executions — yet they were repeating the same mistakes.

Some participants argued that the executions were necessary. Naji Ali al-Ashwal wrote that some armies suffer from fear of their enemy until they taste his blood. He also wrote that the leadership fed the revolutionaries the blood of the enemy, and that the fall of the head of the Court of Appeal dispelled all clouds of despair.

Other participants claimed that the success of the revolution was linked to the public seeing the blood of the fallen regime. According to one account, the crowds applauded when they saw the necks of symbols of reaction and Imamate thrown into the square.

In some cases, executions were carried out in public squares. Anwar Sadat, who visited Sana'a in 1963, reportedly protested against the public display of executions, describing the method as "savage".

Some bodies were buried in mass graves near the Officers' Club in Sana'a (now the Khuzaymah cemetery). Al-Baydani claimed that upon his arrival in Sana'a on 30 September 1962, he stopped the killings and opposed al-Sallal over the execution of Sheikh Sinan Abu Luhum. He also stated that al-Sallal had ordered the executions on 26 and 27 September while al-Baydani was still in Cairo.

The revolutionary command attempted to channel arrests through a newly established "People's Court" headed by Lieutenant Colonel Ghalib al Shara'i, with Abdullah Barakat as public prosecutor and Hadi Issa as a member. According to the public prosecutor, the court was created almost by accident, after a man named Jibr bin Jibr stopped the execution of a prisoner named Ali Mani' and demanded a proper trial. However, the court soon became overwhelmed with approximately 600 cases.

On 12 June 1963, Sana'a Radio announced the execution of nine detainees, including Qasim al-Thawr and Hussein al-Waysi, before their trials had been completed. This news shocked some of the original revolutionaries, including al-Zubayri and al-Eryani, who sent a protest to al-Sallal demanding an end to the killings, which they said had damaged the reputation of the revolution.

=== Diplomatic attempts ===
Saudi Arabia, fearing Nasserist encroachment, moved troops along its border with Yemen, as King Hussein of Jordan dispatched his army chief of staff for discussions with al-Badr's uncle, Prince Hassan. Between October 2–8, four Saudi cargo planes left Saudi Arabia loaded with arms and military material for Yemeni royalist tribesmen; however, the pilots defected to Aswan. Ambassadors from Bonn, London, Washington D.C., and Amman supported the imam, while ambassadors from Cairo, Rome and Belgrade declared support for the republican revolution. The USSR was the first nation to recognize the new republic, and Nikita Khrushchev cabled Sallal: "Any act of aggression against Yemen will be considered an act of aggression against the Soviet Union".

The United States was concerned that the conflict might spread to other parts of the Middle East. President John F. Kennedy rushed to send notes to Nasser, Faisal of Saudi Arabia, Hussein, and Sallal. His plan was that Nasser's troops should withdraw from Yemen while Saudi Arabia and Jordan halted their aid to the imam. Nasser agreed to pull out his forces only after Jordan and Saudi Arabia "stop all aggressive operations on the frontiers". Faisal and Hussein rejected Kennedy's plan, since it would involve US recognition of the "rebels". They insisted that the US should withhold recognition of Sallal's presidency because the imam might still regain control of Yemen, and that Nasser had no intention of pulling out. The Saudis argued that Nasser wanted their oil fields and was hoping to use Yemen as a springboard for revolt in the rest of the Arabian Peninsula. King Hussein of Jordan was also convinced that Nasser's target was Saudi Arabia's oil and that, if the Saudis went, he would be next.

Sallal declared "I warn America that if it does not recognize the Yemen Arab Republic, I shall not recognize it!". US chargé d'affaires in Taiz, Robert Stookey, reported that the republican regime was in full control of the country, except in some border areas. However, the British government was insisting on the strength of the imam's tribal support. A letter, which was kept confidential until January 1963, from President Kennedy to Faisal dated October 25, stated: "You may be assured of full US support for the maintenance of Saudi Arabian integrity". American jet aircraft twice staged shows of force in Saudi Arabia. The first involved six F-100 jets staging stunt-flying demonstrations over Riyadh and Jeddah; on the second, two jet bombers and a giant jet transport, while returning to their base near Paris after a visit to Karachi, Pakistan, put on a demonstration over Riyadh.

Sallal proclaimed Yemen's "firm policy to honor its international obligations", including a 1934 treaty pledging respect for Britain's Aden Protectorate. Nasser promised to "start gradual withdrawal" of its 18,000-man force, "provided Saudi and Jordanian forces also retire from border regions", but would leave his technicians and advisers behind. On December 19, the US became the 34th nation to recognize the Yemen Arab Republic. United Nations recognition followed the next day. The UN continued to consider the republic the only authority in the land and completely ignored the royalists.

Britain, with its commitment to South Arabia and its base in Aden, considered the Egyptian intervention a real threat. Recognition of the republic posed a problem to several treaties Britain had signed with the sheiks and sultans of the South Arabian Federation. Saudi Arabia urged the British to ally themselves with the royalists. On the other hand, there were some in the British Foreign Office who believed Britain could buy security for Aden by recognizing the republic. However, Britain eventually decided not to recognize the regime. Iran, Turkey and most of western Europe also withheld recognition. The republic did receive the recognition from West Germany, Italy, Canada and Australia, as well as the remaining Arab governments, Ethiopia, and the entire communist bloc.

A week after the US recognized the republic, Sallal boasted at a military parade that the republic had rockets that could strike "the palaces of Saudi Arabia", and, in early January, the Egyptians again bombed and strafed Najran, a Saudi Arabian city near the Yemeni border. The US responded with another aerial demonstration over Jeddah and a destroyer joined on January 15. The US reportedly agreed to send antiaircraft batteries and radar-control equipment to Najran. In addition, Ralph Bunche was sent to Yemen, where he met with Sallal and Egyptian Field Marshal Abdel Hakim Amer. On March 6, Bunche was in Cairo, where Nasser reportedly assured him that he would withdraw his troops from Yemen if the Saudis would stop supporting the royalists.

=== Operation Hard-surface ===
While Bunche was reporting to UN Secretary-General U Thant, the United States Department of State sought the help of ambassador Ellsworth Bunker. His mission was based on a decision made by the National Security Council, which was conceived by McGeorge Bundy and Robert Komer. The idea behind what became known as "Operation Hard-surface" was to trade American protection (or the appearance of it) for a Saudi commitment to halt aid to the royalists, on the basis of which the Americans would get Nasser to withdraw his troops. The operation would consist of "eight little planes".

Bunker arrived in Riyadh on March 6. Faisal refused Bunker's offer, which was also hitched to pledges of reform. The original instructions for Operation Hard-surface were that American planes would "attack and destroy" any intruders over Saudi air space, but were later changed to read that the Saudis could defend themselves if attacked. Bunker evidently stuck to the original formula and stressed that only if Faisal would halt his aid to the royalists, the US would be able pressure Nasser to withdraw. Faisal eventually accepted the offer, and Bunker went on to meet with Nasser in Beirut, where the Egyptian President repeated the assurance he had given Bunche.

The Bunche and Bunker mission gave birth to the idea of an observer mission to Yemen, which eventually became the United Nations Yemen Observation Mission. The former UN Congo commander, Swedish Major General Carl von Horn established the UN observer team. His disengagement agreement called for:

1. Establishing a demilitarized zone extending 20 kilometers on either side of a demarcated Saudi Arabian Yemen border, from which all military equipment was to be excluded
2. Stationing UN observers within this zone on both sides of the border to observe, report, and prevent any continued attempt by the Saudis to supply royalist forces.

On April 30, von Horn was sent to discover what kind of force was required. A few days later, he met with Amer in Cairo and discovered that Egypt had no intention of drawing all its troops from Yemen. After a few more days, the Saudi deputy Minister for Foreign Affairs, Omar Saqqaff, told him that the Saudis would not accept any attempt by Egypt to leave security forces after its withdrawal. Saudi Arabia had already been cutting back on its support to the royalists, in part because Egypt's projected plan for unity with Syria and Iraq made Nasser seem too dangerous. By that time, the war was costing Egypt $1,000,000 a day and nearly 5,000 casualties. Although promising to remove its troops, Egypt had the privilege of leaving an unspecified number for "training" Yemen's republican army.

In June, von Horn went to San'a, in an unsuccessful attempt to achieve the objectives of:

1. Ending Saudi aid to the royalists
2. Creating a 25-mile demilitarized strip along the Saudi border
3. Supervising the phased withdrawal of the Egyptian troops.

In September, von Horn cabled his resignation to U Thant, who announced that the mission would continue, due to "oral assurances" by Egypt and Saudi Arabia to continue financing it. The number of Egyptian troops increased, and at the end of January, the "Hard-surface" squadron was withdrawn after a wrangle with Faisal. On September 4, 1964, the UN admitted failure and withdrew.

=== Egyptian offensives ===
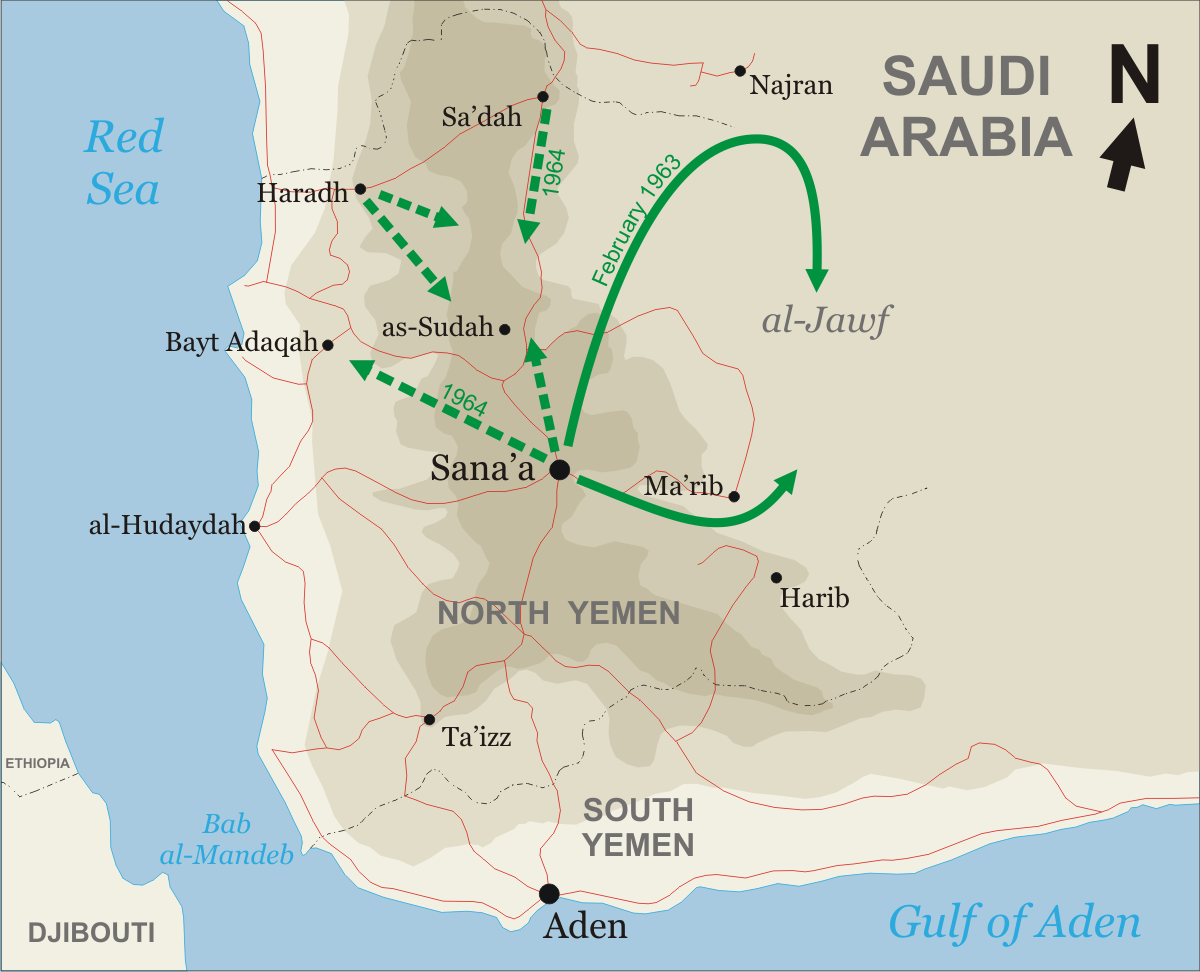
The Ramadan (solid line) and Haradh (dotted line) offensives

The Egyptian general staff divided the Yemen War into three operational objectives. The first was the air phase, which began with jet trainers modified to strafe and carry bombs and ended with three wings of fighter-bombers stationed near the Saudi-Yemeni border. Egyptian sorties traveled along the Yemen's Tihama coast and into the Saudi towns of Najran and Jizan. It was designed to attack royalist ground formations and substitute the lack of Egyptian ground formations with high-tech air power. In combination with Egyptian air strikes, a second operational phase involved securing major routes leading to San'a, and from there securing key towns and hamlets.

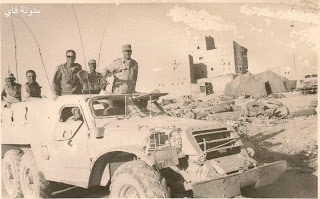
Egyptian army officer Saad el-Shazly on the BTR-152 in North Yemen.

The largest offensive based on this operational tactic was the March 1963 "Ramadan Offensive" that lasted until February 1964. The offensive focused on opening and securing roads from San'a to Sadah to the North, and San'a to Marib to the East. The Egyptian forces' success meant that royalist resistance could take refuge in the hills and mountains to regroup and carry out hit-and-run offensives against republican and Egyptian units controlling towns and roads. The third strategic offensive was the pacification of tribes and enticing them to support the republican government. This required the expenditure of massive amounts of funds for humanitarian needs and outright bribery of tribal leaders.

==== Ramadan offensive ====
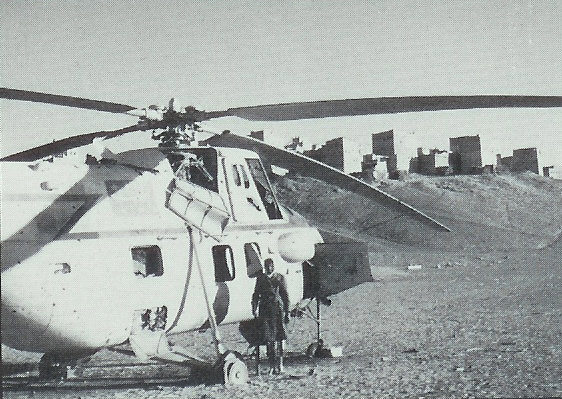
A republican helicopter, captured early in the war by the royalists outside Marib

The Ramadan offensive began in February 1963 when Amer and Sadat arrived in San'a. Amer asked Cairo to double the 20,000 men in Yemen, and, in early February, the first 5,000 of the reinforcements arrived. On February 18, a task force of 15 tanks, 20 armored cars, 18 trucks and numerous jeeps departed San'a' moving northwards, heading for Sadah. More garrison troops followed. A few days later, another task force, spearheaded by 350 men in tanks and armored cars, left Sadah heading southeast toward Marib. They maneuvered into the Rub al-Khali desert, perhaps well into Saudi territory, and there the forces were built up by an airlift. Then they headed west. On February 25, the forces occupied Marib, and on March 7 they took Harib. A royalist force of 1,500 men ordered down from Najran failed to stop them on their way out from Sadah. The royalist commander at Harib fled to Beihan, on the British-protected side of the border. In the battle of El-Argoup, 25 miles (40 km) southeast of San'a, 500 royalists under Prince Abdullah's command attacked an Egyptian position on top of a sheer-sided hill that was fortified with six Soviet T-54 tanks, a dozen armored cars and entrenched machine guns. The royalists advanced in a thin skirmish line and were plastered by artillery, mortars, and strafing planes. They replied with rifles, one mortar with twenty rounds, and a bazooka with four rounds. The battle lasted a week and cost the Egyptians three tanks, seven armored cars, and 160 dead. The Egyptians were now in positions from which they could hope to interdict the royalist movement of supplies in the mountains north and east of San'a'.

In the beginning of April, the royalists held a conference with Faisal in Riyadh. They decided to adopt new tactics, including attempts to get supplies around the positions now held by the Egyptians by using camels instead of trucks to cross the mountains to reach the positions east of San'a. Camel caravans from Beihan would swing into the Rub al-Khali and enter Yemen north of Marib. It was also decided that the royalists must now strengthen their operations west of the mountains with three "armies". By the end of April, they began to recover and were contending to regain some of the positions the Egyptians had taken in the Jawf, particularly the small but strategic towns of Barat and Safra, both in the mountains between Sadah and the Jawf, and were able to move freely in the eastern Khabt desert. In the Jawf, they claimed to have cleaned up all Egyptian strong-points except Hazm and, in the west, the town of Batanah.

==== Haradh offensive ====
On June 12, about 4,000 Egyptian infantry, reinforced by the republican army and mercenaries from the Aden protectorate, invaded the town of Beit Adaqah, about 30 miles (48 km) west of San'a, where Prince Abdullah held a front extending from the Hodeida road, through Kawakaban Province, to southern Hajjah. In two days, the attackers advanced about 12 miles (19 km), before being repelled by a counter-attack. The royalists admitted about 250 casualties. Next, the Egyptians attacked Sudah, about 100 miles (160 km) north-west of San'a. They leveraged the unpopularity of the local royalist commander to bribe several local sheiks and occupied the town unopposed. After a month, the sheiks sent delegations to al-Badr soliciting pardons and asking for guns and money with which to fight the Egyptians. Al-Badr sent new forces and managed to regain the surroundings of Sudah, though not the town itself.

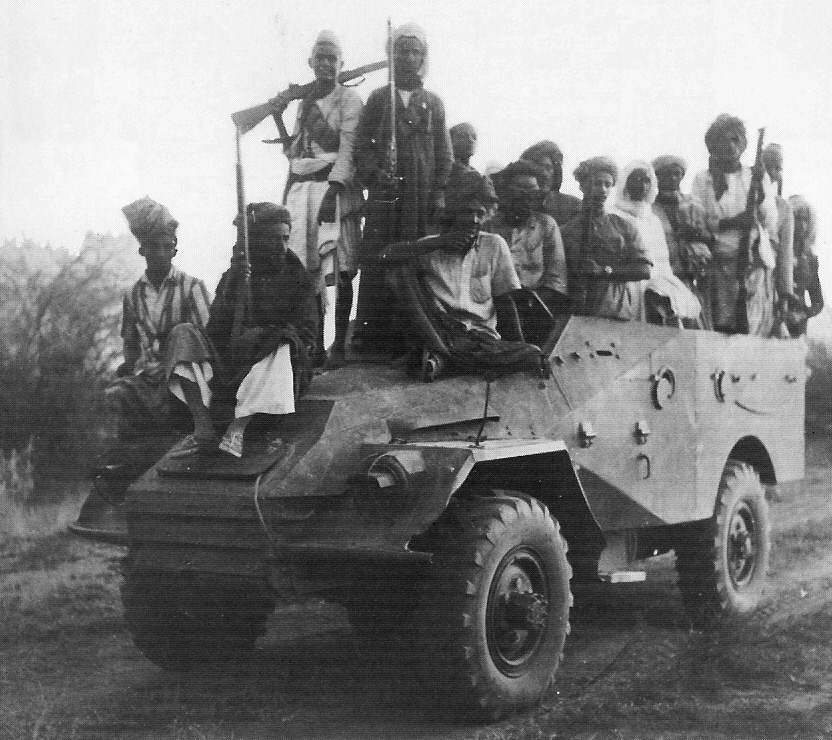
A Soviet-manufactured armored car, captured by royalist guerrillas from the Egyptians near Haradh

On August 15, the Egyptians launched an offensive from their major north-western base in Haradh. They had 1,000 troops and about 2,000 republicans. The plan, as interpreted by British intelligence, seemed to have been to cut the 30-mile (48-kilometer) track southward through the mountains from the Saudi border at Al Khubah to al-Badr's headquarters in the Qara mountains near Washa, and then to split into two task forces: one moving east through Washa to the headquarters and the other north-east along the track to the Saudi border below the Razih mountains. The Egyptians began their move on Saturday morning, moving along the Haradh and Tashar ravines. On Saturday and Sunday afternoons, they were caught in heavy rain and their vehicles, including 20 tanks and about 40 armored cars sank axle-deep into the mud. The defenders left them alone until Monday at dawn. Al-Badr left his headquarters at 3 a.m. with 1,000 men to direct a counterattack in the Tashar ravine, while Abdullah Hussein attacked in the Haradh ravine.

Meanwhile, the Egyptians had planned a coordinated drive from Sadah to the southwest, below the Razih mountains, hoping to link up with the force coming from Haradh. They were counting on a local sheik, whose forces were to supposed to join 250 Egyptian parachutists. The sheik failed to deliver, and the parachutists made their way back to Sadah, suffering losses from snipers on the way. Al-Badr had sent radio messages and summonses by runner in all directions calling for reinforcement. He asked reserve forces training in the Jawf to arrive in trucks mounting 55- and 57-millimeter cannon and 81 millimeter mortars and heavy machine guns. They arrived within 48 hours, in time to face the attackers. They outflanked the Egyptian columns, still stuck in mud in the ravines. They later announced they had knocked out 10 of the Egyptian tanks and about half of their armored cars, and claimed to have shot down an Ilyushin bomber. The royalists also carried out two supporting movements. One was a raid on Jihana, in which several staff officers were killed. The second was an attempt, involving British advisors and French and Belgian mercenaries from Katanga, to bombard San'a from a nearby mountain peak. Other diversionary operations included raids on Egyptian aircraft and tanks at the south airport of San'a, and a mortar at the Egyptian and republican residence in a suburb of Taiz. Although the Egyptians managed to drive al-Badr out of his headquarters to a cave on Jabal Shedah mountain, they could not close the Saudi border. They declared victory on the radio and in the press, but were obliged to agree to a ceasefire in the upcoming Erkwit conference on November 2.

=== Alexandria summit and Erkwit ceasefire ===
In September 1964, Nasser and Faisal met at the Arab summit in Alexandria. By that time, Egypt had 40,000 troops in Yemen and had suffered an estimated 10,000 casualties. In their official communiqué, the two leaders promised to:

1. Cooperate fully to solve the existing differences between the various factions in Yemen
2. Work together in preventing armed clashes in Yemen
3. Reach a solution by peaceful agreement.

The communiqué was widely hailed in the Arab world, and Washington called it a "statesmanlike action" and a "major step toward eventual peaceful settlement of the long civil war". Nasser and Faisal warmly embraced at Alexandria's airport and called each other "brother". Faisal said he was leaving Egypt "with my heart brimming with love for President Nasser".

On November 2, at a secret conference in Erkwit, Sudan, the royalists and republicans declared a ceasefire effective at 1:00 p.m. on Monday, November 8. Tribesmen of both sides celebrated the decision until that day, and for two days after it went into effect, they fraternized in several locations. On November 2 and 3, nine royalists and nine republicans, with a Saudi and an Egyptian observer, worked out the terms. A conference of 168 tribal leaders was planned for November 23. For the royalists, the conference was to become an embryonic national assembly that would name a provisional national executive of two royalists, two republicans and one neutral to administer the country provisionally and to plan a plebiscite. Until that plebiscite, which would decide whether Yemen would be a monarchy or a republic, both Sallal and al-Badr were to step aside. At the end of the two days, the Egyptians resumed their bombing of royalist positions. The conference was planned for November 23, postponed to the 30th, and then postponed indefinitely. The republicans blamed the royalists for not arriving, while the royalists blamed the Egyptian bombings.

=== Royalist offensive ===
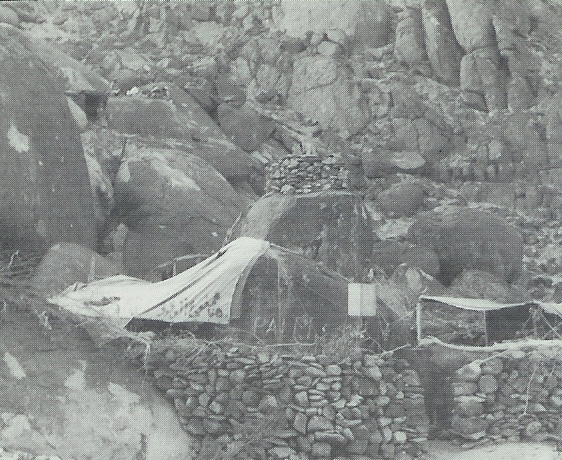
The camp used by royalist forces at Hanjar, in north-eastern Yemen

Between December 1964 and February 1965, the royalists discerned four Egyptian attempts to drive directly into the Razih mountains. The intensity of these thrusts gradually diminished, and it was estimated that the Egyptians lost 1,000 men who were killed, wounded, and taken prisoner. Meanwhile, the royalists were building up an offensive. The Egyptian line of communications went from San'a to Amran, then Khairath, where it branched off north-eastwards to Harf. From Harf, the line turned due south to Farah, and then South-eastwards to Humaidat, Mutamah, and Hazm. From Hazm it led south-eastwards to Marib and Harib. A military convoy went over this route twice a month. Since the royalists had closed the direct route across the mountains from San'a to Marib, the Egyptians had no alternative.

The objective of the royalists under the command of Prince Mohamed was to cut the Egyptians' line and force them to withdraw. They intended to take over the garrisons along this line and establish positions from which they could interdict the Egyptian movement. They had prepared the attack with the help of the Nahm tribe, who tricked the Egyptians into believing that they were their allies and would take care of the mountain pass, known as Wadi Humaidat, themselves. The royalist deal was that the Nahm would be entitled to loot the ambushed Egyptians. The Egyptians may have suspected something was up, as they sent a reconnaissance aircraft over the area a day before the attack. The royalists occupied two mountains known as Asfar and Ahmar and installed 75-mm guns and mortars overlooking the wadi. On April 15, the day after the last Egyptian convoy went through, the royalists launched a surprise attack. Both forces numbered at only a few thousand. The guns positioned on Asfar and Ahmar opened fire, and then the Nahm came out from behind the rocks. Finally, Prince Mohamed's troops followed. This time, the royalists' operation was fully coordinated by radio. Some of the Egyptians surrendered without resistance, others fled to Harah 800 yards to the north. Both sides brought reinforcements and the battle shifted between Harf and Hazm.

Meanwhile, Prince Abdullah bin Hassan began to raid Egyptian positions north-east of San'a at Urush, While Prince Mohamed bin Mohsin was attacking the Egyptians with 500 men west of Humaidat, Prince Hassan struck out from near Sadah and Prince Hassan bin Hussein moved from Jumaat, west of Sadah, to within mortar-firing distance of the Egyptian airfield west of Sadah. Fifty Egyptians surrendered at Mutanah, near Humaidat. They were eventually allowed to evacuate to San'a with their weapons. Mohamed's policy was to keep officers as prisoners for exchange, and to allow soldiers to go in return for their weapons. Three- to five-thousand Egyptian troops in garrisons on the eastern slopes of the mountains and in the desert now had to be supplied entirely by air.

=== Stalemate ===
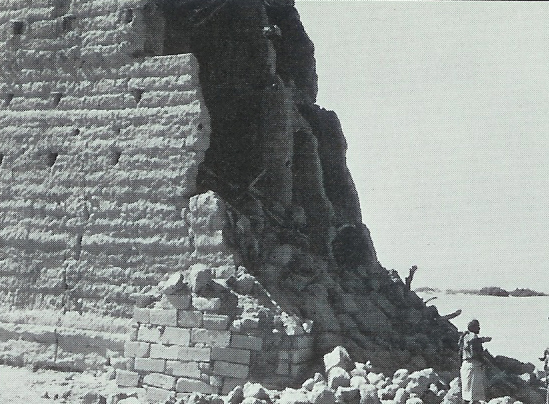
Egyptian bomb damage in a village near Marib

The royalist radio tried to widen the split in republican ranks by promising amnesty to all non-royalists once the Egyptians withdrew. Al-Badr also promised a new form of government: "a constitutionally democratic system" ruled by a "national assembly elected by the people of Yemen". At Sallal's request, Nasser provided him with ammunition and troop reinforcements by transport plane from Cairo. By August, the royalists had seven "armies", each varying in strength between 3,000 and 10,000 men, with a total somewhere between 40,000 and 60,000. There were also five or six times as many armed royal tribesmen, and the regular force under Prince Mohamed. In early June, they moved into Sirwah in eastern Yemen. On June 14, they entered Qaflan and, on July 16, they occupied Marib. According to official Egyptian army figures, 15,194 of their troops had died. Other sources report 20,000 or 26,000 Egyptian deaths. The war was costing Egypt $500,000 a day. The royalists had lost an estimated 40,000 dead. In late August, Nasser decided to get the Soviets more involved in the conflict. He convinced them to cancel a $500 million debt he had incurred and provide military aid to the republicans. In early May, Sallal fired his premier, General Hassan Amri, and appointed Ahmed Noman in his place. Noman was considered a moderate who believed in compromise. He had resigned as president of the republican Consultative Council in December in protest against Sallal's "failure to fulfill the people's aspirations". Noman's first act was to name a new 15-man Cabinet, maintaining an even balance between Yemen's two main tribal groupings, the Zaidi Shias from the mountains, who were mostly royalist, and the Shafi'i Sunnis, who were mostly republican.

=== Nasser's "long-breath" strategy ===
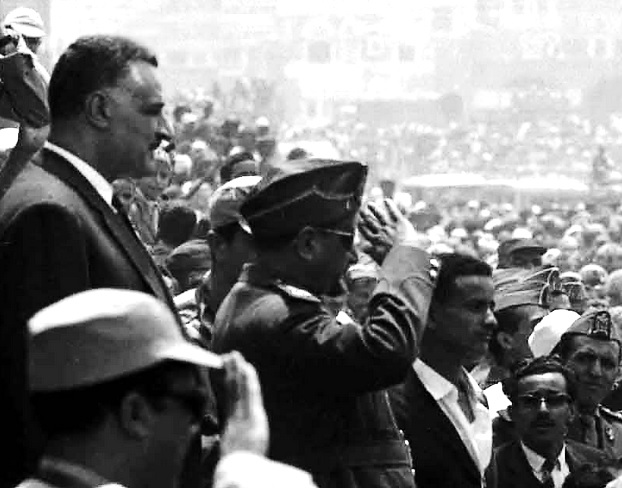
Egyptian President Gamal Abdel Nasser (standing to the left) welcomed by Yemeni crowds on his visit to Sanaa, April 1964. In front of Nasser is Yemeni President al-Sallal, saluting.

Egypt had run up a foreign debt of nearly $3 billion, and the gap between exports and imports had widened to a record $500 million in 1965. On victory day in Port Said, Nasser conceded that "We are facing difficulties. We must all work harder and make sacrifices. I have no magic button that I can push to produce the things you want". Premier Zakaria Mohieddin raised Egypt's income tax, added a "defense tax" on all sales, and boosted tariffs on nonessential imports. He also hiked the cost of luxury goods by 25% and set low price ceilings on most foodstuffs. He sent 400 plainclothesmen to Cairo to arrest 150 shopkeepers for price violations. In March 1966, the Egyptian forces, now numbering almost 60,000, launched their biggest offensive. The royalists counterattacked but the stalemate resumed. Egyptian-supported groups executed sabotage bombings in Saudi Arabia.

In a speech on May Day, 1966, Nasser said the war was entering a new phase. He launched what he called a "long-breath strategy". The plan was to pare the army down from 70,000 men to 40,000, withdraw from exposed positions in eastern and northern Yemen, and tighten the hold on particular parts of Yemen: the Red Sea coastline; a northern boundary that takes in the well-fortified town of Hajja and Sanaa; and the border with the South Arabian Federation, which was to become independent in 1968. Nasser insisted that attacks on Najran, Qizan and other "bases of aggression" would continue, arguing that "these were originally Yemeni towns, which the Saudis usurped in 1930".

The assistant secretary of state for the Near East and South Asia, flew in for talks with both Faisal and Nasser. In Alexandria, Nasser refused to pull out his troops, despite the risk of losing part or all of a new $150 million US food-distribution program, and another $100 million worth of industrial-development aid. Later that month, Alexei Kosygin counseled Nasser not to risk a stoppage of the U.S. Food for Peace program because Russia could not afford to pay the bill. The Soviets were also willing to aid Nasser with arms and equipment in Yemen, but feared that a widening of the conflict to Saudi Arabia would lead to a "hot war" confrontation in the Middle East. Nasser was warned that "the Soviet Union would be displeased to see an attack on Saudi Arabia".

In October, Sallal's palace in Sanaa was attacked with a bazooka, and insurgents began targeting an Egyptian army camp outside the city and setting fire to Egyptian installations, killing a reported 70 Egyptian troops. Sallal arrested about 140 suspects, including Mohamed Ruwainy, the ex-minister for tribal affairs, and Colonel Hadi Issa, former deputy chief of staff of the armed forces. Sallal accused Ruwainy and Issa of organizing a "subversive network seeking to plunge the country into terrorism and panic" and planning a campaign of assassination, financed by Saudi Arabia, Britain, Israel and the US. Ruwainy, Issa, and five others were executed, while eight others received prison sentences ranging from five years to life. In February 1967, Nasser vowed to "stay in Yemen 20 years if necessary", while Prince Hussein bin Ahmed said "We are prepared to fight for 50 years to keep Nasser out, just as we did the Ottoman Turks". Tunisia broke diplomatic relations with the republic, stating that the Sallal government no longer had power to govern the country. Sallal's chargé d'affaires in Czechoslovakia flew to Beirut and announced that he was on his way to offer his services to the royalists. Nasser said that "As the situation now stands, Arab summits are finished forever".

==== Chemical warfare ====
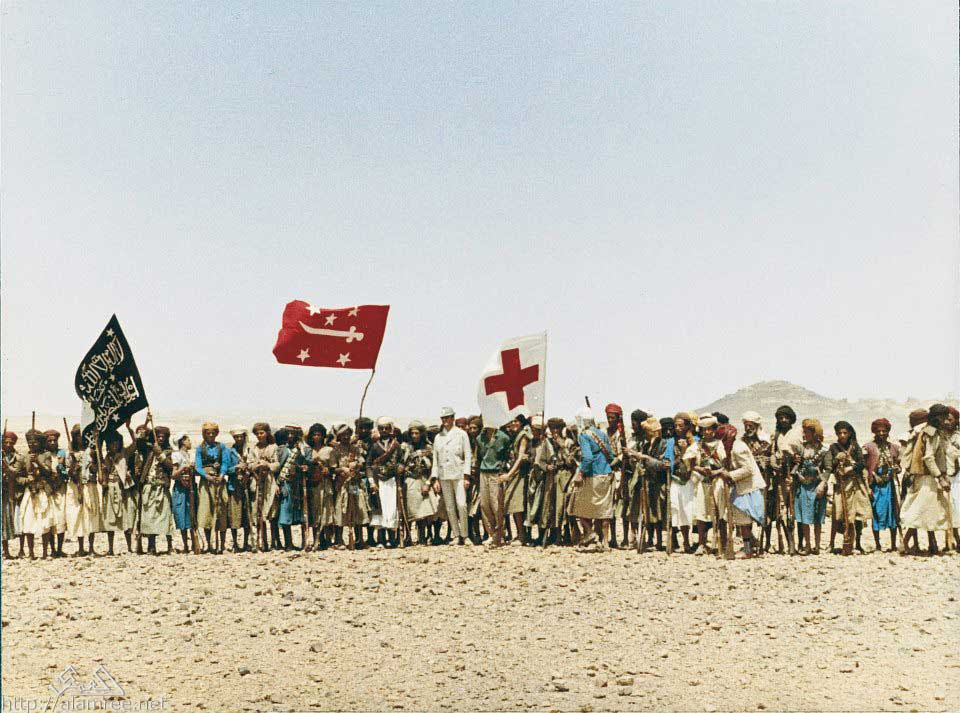
Kingdom of Yemen receiving Red Cross aid

Egyptian forces made use of chemical warfare during the conflict, including attacks with nerve gas. The prevalence of gas attacks sharply increased from 1967 onwards. They have been described by Asher Orkaby as "a calculated part of the Egyptian effort to depopulate the countryside" through scorched-earth policies.

The first use of gas took place on June 8, 1963, against Kawma, a village of about 100 inhabitants in northern Yemen, killing about 7 people and damaging the eyes and lungs of 25 others. This incident is considered to have been experimental, and the bombs were described by Dana Schmidt as "home-made, amateurish and relatively ineffective". The Egyptian authorities suggested that the reported incidents were probably caused by napalm, not gas. The Israeli foreign minister, Golda Meir, suggested in an interview that Nasser would not hesitate to use gas against Israel as well. There were no reports of gas during 1964, and only a few reports in 1965. The reports grew more frequent in late 1966. On December 11, 1966, 15 gas bombs killed 2 people and injured 35. On January 5, 1967, the biggest gas attack came against the village of Kitaf, causing 270 casualties, including 140 fatalities. The target may have been Prince Hassan bin Yahya, who had installed his headquarters nearby. The Egyptian government denied using poison gas, claiming that Britain and the US were using the reports as psychological warfare against Egypt. On February 12, 1967, Egypt said it would welcome a UN investigation. On March 1, U Thant said he was "powerless" to deal with the matter.

On May 10, the twin villages of Gahar and Gadafa in Wadi Hirran, where Prince Mohamed bin Mohsin was in command, were gas bombed, resulting in at least 75 deaths. The Red Cross was alerted and, on June 2, it issued a statement in Geneva expressing concern. The Institute of Forensic Medicine at the University of Bern made a statement, based on a Red Cross report, that the gas was likely to have been made of halogenous derivatives—phosgene, mustard gas, lewisite, chlorine, or cyanogen bromide. The gas attacks stopped for three weeks after the Six-Day War in June, but resumed against all parts of royalist Yemen in July. Casualty estimates vary, and a conservative assumption is that the mustard- and phosgene-filled aerial bombs caused approximately 1,500 fatalities and 1,500 injuries. The Egyptian use of nerve gas (sometimes directed against local populations in a punitive way) contributed to popular resentment against the republican forces, especially in the Ṣaʿdah region. During the war, the CIA found that gas was being used. However, the Americans opted to downplay this aspect of Egyptian warfare in their public statements, partially because it would have invited criticism of their own large-scale use of chemical weapons during the Vietnam War. Other major powers also refrained from calling out the human rights abuses.

=== Egyptian withdrawal ===
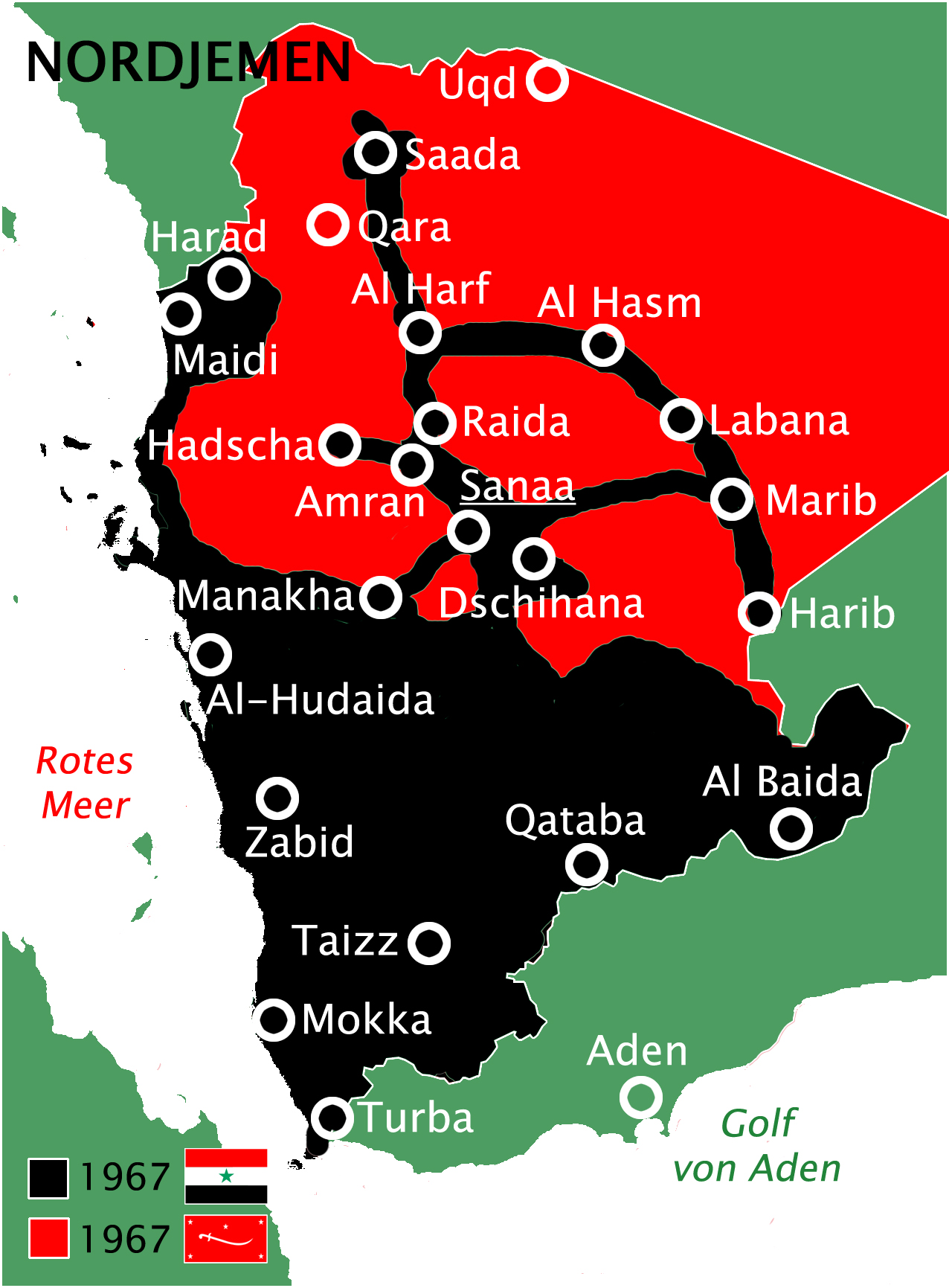
Situation in North Yemen 1967 between Republicans (black) and Zaidi Royalists (red)

By 1967, Egyptian forces relied exclusively on defending a triangle linking Hodeida, Taiz, and San'a, while striking southern Saudi Arabia and North Yemen with air sorties. In August 1967, to make up for the 15,000 killed, captured, or missing Egyptians as a result of the Six-Day War, Nasser recalled 15,000 of his troops from Yemen. Egypt imposed higher taxes on its middle and upper classes, raised workers' compulsory monthly savings by 50%, reduced overtime pay, cut the sugar ration by a third, and curtailed practically all major industrial programs. Only military expenditures were increased, going from $140 million to an estimated $1 billion. Nasser also increased the price of beer, cigarettes, long-distance bus and railroad fares, and movie tickets. Egypt was losing $5,000,000 a week in revenues from closing the Suez Canal, on the other side of which the Israelis were sitting on the Sinai wells that had produced half of Egypt's oil supply. Egypt's hard-currency debt was now approaching $1.5 billion and its foreign-exchange reserves were down to $100 million.

As part of the Khartoum Resolution of August, Egypt announced that it was ready to end the war in Yemen. The Egyptian foreign minister, Mahmoud Riad, proposed that Egypt and Saudi Arabia revive their Jeddah Agreement of 1965. Faisal expressed satisfaction with Nasser's offer, and al-Badr promised to send his troops to fight with Egypt against Israel, if Nasser lived up to the Jeddah agreement Nasser and Faisal signed a treaty under which Nasser would pull out his 20,000 troops from Yemen, Faisal would stop sending arms to al-Badr, and three neutral Arab states would send in observers. Sallal accused Nasser of betrayal. Nasser unfroze more than $100 million of Saudi assets in Egypt, and Faisal denationalized two Egyptian-owned banks that he had taken over earlier that year. Saudi Arabia, Libya, and Kuwait agreed to provide Egypt with an annual subsidy of $266 million, out of which $154 million was to be paid by Saudi Arabia.

Sallal's popularity among his troops declined and, after two bazooka attacks on his home by disaffected soldiers, he took Egyptian guards. He ordered the execution of his security chief, Colonel Abdel Kader Khatari, after Khatari's police fired into a mob attacking an Egyptian command post in San'a, and had refused to recognize the committee of Arab leaders appointed at Khartoum to arrange peace terms. He also fired his entire cabinet and formed a new one, installing three army men in key ministries, and took over the army ministry and the foreign ministry for himself. Meanwhile, Nasser announced the release of three republican leaders—Abdul Rahman al-Eryani, Ahmed Noman and General Amri—who had been held prisoner in Egypt for over a year, and who were in favor of peace with the royalists. When Sallal met with Nasser in Cairo in early November, Nasser advised him to resign and go into exile. Sallal refused and went to Baghdad, hoping to get support from other Arab socialists. As soon as he left Cairo, Nasser sent a cable to San'a, instructing his troops there not to block an attempt at a coup.

=== Siege of Sanaa ===
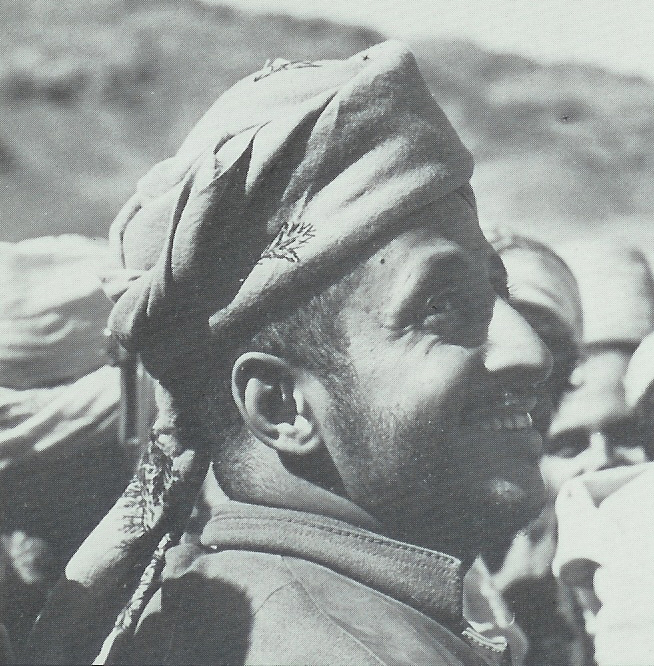
Prince Mohamed bin Hussein, deputy to Muhammad al-Badr, in command of the royalist forces besieging San'a, December 1967

On November 5, 1967, Yemeni dissidents, supported by republican tribesmen called down to San'a, moved four tanks into the city's dusty squares, took over the presidential palace and announced over the government radio station that Sallal had been removed "from all positions of authority". The coup went unopposed. In Baghdad, Sallal asked for political asylum, saying "every revolutionary must anticipate obstacles and difficult situations". The Iraqi government offered him a home and a monthly grant of 500 dinars.

The new republican government was headed by Qadi Abdul Rahman al-Eryani, Ahmed Noman, and Mohamed Ali Uthman. The prime minister was Mohsin al-Aini. Noman, however, remained in Beirut. He was doubtful of his colleagues' reluctance to negotiate with the Hamidaddin family, preferring to expel them instead. On November 23, he resigned, and was replaced by Hassan Amri. Prince Mohamed bin Hussein told the country's chiefs "We have money, and you will have your share if you join us. If not, we will go on without you". The chiefs agreed to mobilize their tribes. Six-thousand royalist regulars and 50,000 armed tribesmen known as "the Fighting Rifles" surrounded San'a, captured its main airport, and severed the highway to the port of Hodeida, a main route for Russian supplies. In a battle 12 miles east of the capital, 3,200 soldiers from both sides were killed, and an entire republican regiment reportedly deserted to the royalists. Bin Hussein gave them an ultimatum: "Surrender the city or be annihilated". Eryani went to Cairo for what the Egyptian official press agency called "a medical checkup". Foreign Minister Hassan Makki also left Yemen, leaving Amri in charge of the government. Amri declared a 6 p.m. curfew and ordered civilians to form militia units "to defend the republic". In Liberation Square, six suspected royalist infiltrators were publicly executed by a firing squad, and their bodies were later strung up on poles.

The republicans boasted a new air force, while the royalists claimed to have shot down a MiG-17 fighter with a Russian pilot. The US State Department said that this claim and reports of 24 MiGs and 40 Soviet technicians and pilots who had arrived in Yemen were correct. In January, the republicans were defending San'a with about 2,000 regulars and tribesmen, plus armed townsmen and about 10 tanks. They also had the backing of 20 or more fighter aircraft piloted by Russians or Yemenis who passed a crash course in the Soviet Union. The city could still feed itself from the countryside immediately surrounding the area. Between 4,000 and 5,000 royalists suffered from republican air power, but had the advantage of high ground. However, they did not have enough ammunition, as the Saudis had halted arms deliveries after the Khartoum agreement and stopped financing the royalists after December.

=== Final accords ===
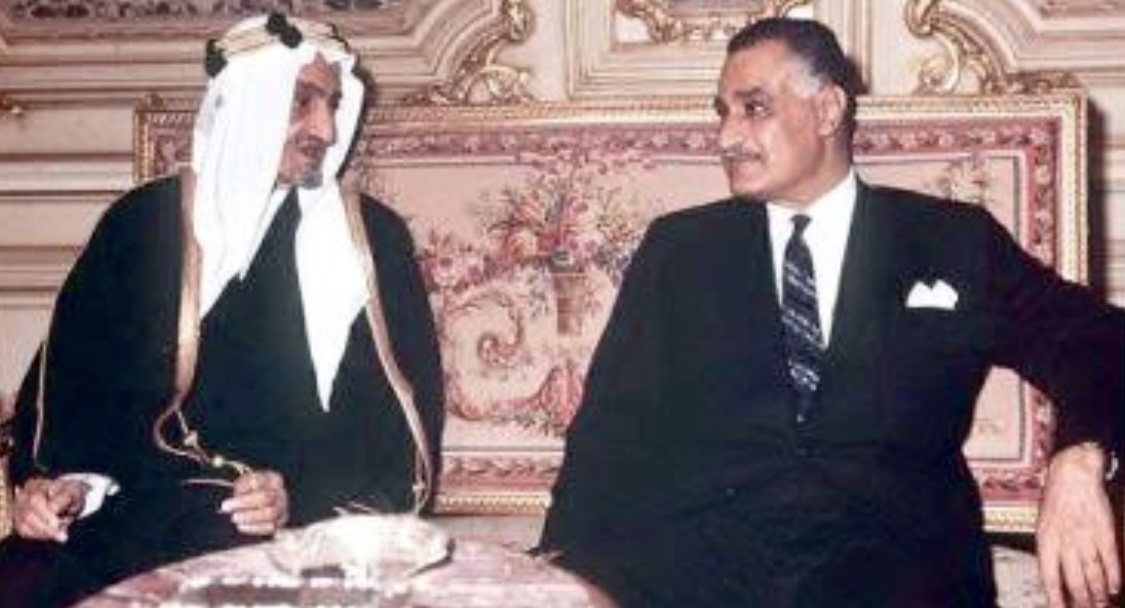
President Gamal Abdel Nasser and King Faisal in Cairo, December 1969

By February 1968, the siege was lifted and the republicans had essentially won the war. Meanwhile, the British had withdrawn from the Federation of South Arabia, which had now become South Yemen. The royalists remained active until 1970. Talks between the two sides commenced while the fighting went on. The foreign minister, Hassan Makki, said "Better years of talk than a day of fighting". In 1970, Saudi Arabia recognized the Republic, and a ceasefire was effected. The Saudis gave the republic a grant of $20 million, which was later repeated intermittently, and Yemeni sheikhs received Saudi stipends.

== Aftermath ==
By 1971, both Egypt and Saudi Arabia had disengaged from Yemen. South Yemen formed a connection with the Soviet Union. In September 1971, Amri resigned after murdering a photographer in San'a, and more power was given to Eryani, the effective president. By then, the royalists were integrated into the new republic, except for al-Badr's family, and a consultative council was established. Clashes along the border between the states rose and, in 1972, a small war broke out.

After the war, the tribes were better represented in the republican government. In 1969, sheikhs were brought into the National Assembly and, in 1971, into the Consultative Council. Under Eryani, the sheikhs, particularly the ones who fought for the republicans, were close to the mediation attempt. By the end of the war, there was a breach between the older and more liberal politicians and republican sheiks, and certain army sheiks and activists from South Yemen. In the summer of 1972, a border war broke out and ended with a declaration from both North Yemen and South Yemen that they would reunite, but they did not. There were complaints in North Yemen about foreign influence by Saudi Arabia.

== Opposing forces ==
=== Royalists ===
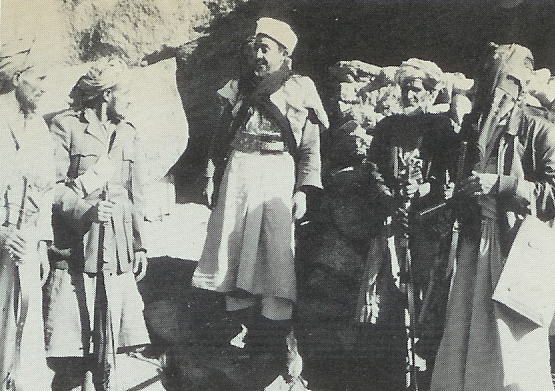
Yemeni Prime Minister, Prince Hassan ibn Yahya, talking to tribesmen outside his cave in Wadi Amlah, December 1962

Muhammad al-Badr led his campaign with the princes of the house of Hamidaddin. Those included Hassan bin Yahya, who had come from New York, Mohamed bin Hussein, Mohamed bin Ismail, Ibrahim al Kipsy, and Abdul Rahman bin Yahya. At 56, Hassan bin Yahya was the oldest and most distinguished. Prince Hassan ibn Yahya was made prime minister and commander-in-chief. The imam was joined by his childhood pen pal, American Bruce Conde, who set up the post office and would later rise to the rank of general in the Royalist forces.

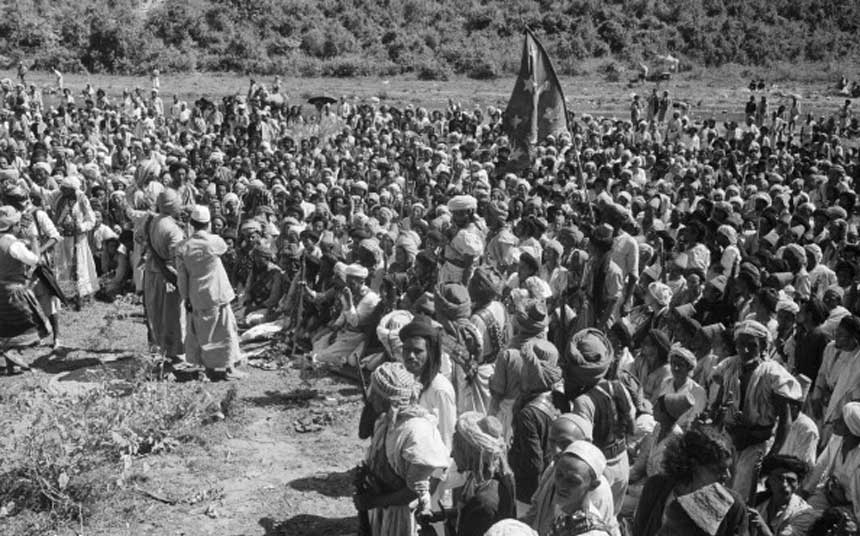
Camp of the royalist forces, 1962.

In 1963, the Saudis spent $15 million to equip royalist tribes, hire hundreds of European mercenaries, and establish their own radio station. Remnants of the Imam's Army also had elements of the Saudi National Guard fight alongside its ranks. Iran subsidized royalist forces on and off, as the Shah (a ruler of a predominantly Shia country) felt compelled to provide al-Badr (a Zaidi Shia leader) with financing. The British allowed convoys of arms to flow through one of its allies in Northern Yemen, the Sheriff of Beijan, who was protected by the British administration in Aden. RAF planes conducted night operations to resupply al-Badr's forces. The MI6 was responsible for contacting the royalists, and used the services of a private company belonging to Colonel David Stirling, founder of the Special Air Service (SAS), who recruited dozens of former SAS men as advisors to the royalists. Britain participated in a $400 million British air defense program for Saudi Arabia. In the US, the Lyndon Johnson administration was more willing than Kennedy's to support long-range plans in support of the Saudi army. In 1965, the US authorized an agreement with the Corps of Engineers to supervise the construction of military facilities and, in 1966, it sponsored a $100 million program that provided the Saudi forces with combat vehicles, mostly trucks. Faisal also initiated an Islamic alignment called the Islamic Conference, to counter Nasser's Arab socialism.

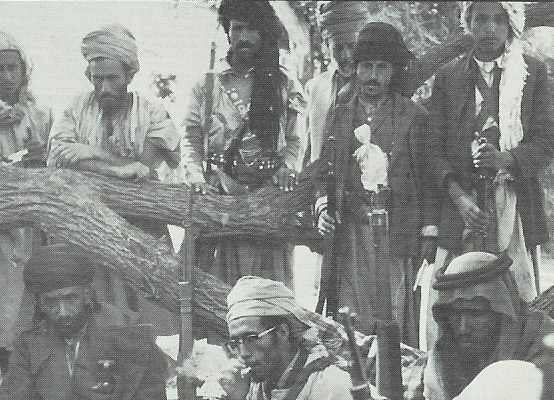
Prince Abdullah Hussein (below, center) with his men soon after the Egyptian air attack in Wadi Hirran, December 1962

The tribes of Southern Saudi Arabia and Northern Yemen were closely linked, and the Saudis enticed thousands of Yemeni workers in Saudi Arabia to assist the royalist cause. In addition to the Saudis and British, the Iraqis also sent plane loads of Baathist Yemenis to undermine Sallal's regime. The royalists fought for the imam despite his father's unpopularity. One sheik said "The Imams have ruled us for a thousand years. Some were good and some bad. We killed the bad ones sooner or later, and we prospered under the good ones". The hill tribes were Shia, like the imam, while the coastal Yemenis and the southern Yemenis were Sunni, as were most Egyptians. President Sallal was himself a mountain Shia fighting with lowland Sunnis. Al-Badr was convinced that he was Nasser's biggest target, saying "Now I'm getting my reward for befriending Nasser. We were brothers, but when I refused to become his stooge, he used Sallal against me. I will never stop fighting. I will never go into exile. Win or lose, my grave will be here".

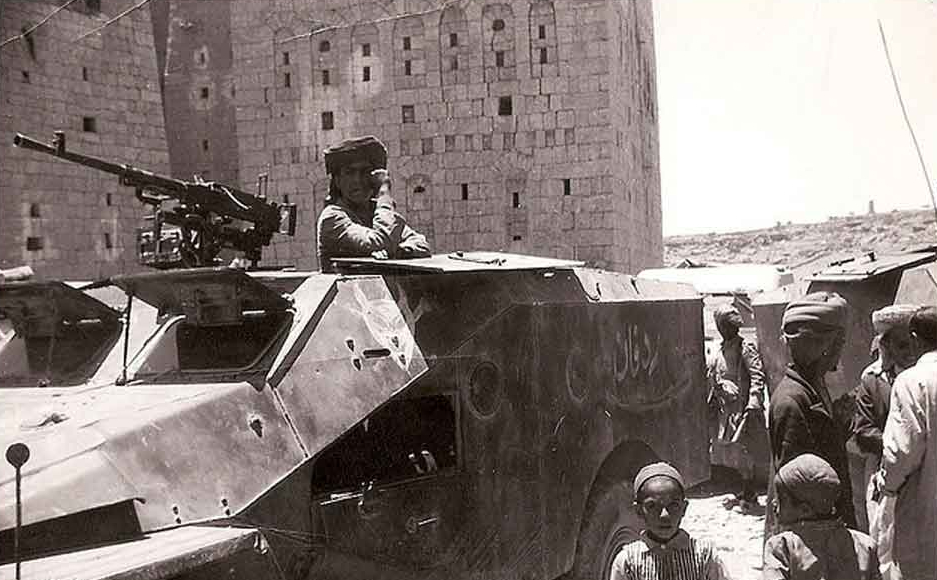
Royalist tribes with captured Egyptian armoured vehicle, 1965.

Al-Badr had formed two royalist armies—one under his uncle Prince Hassan in the east and one under his own control in the west. Both armies controlled most of the north and east of Yemen, including the towns of Harib and Marib. The provincial capital of Northern Yemen, Sadah, which would have given the Imam a key strategic road towards the main capital San'a, was controlled by the republicans. There were also areas, like the town of Hajjah, where the royalists controlled the mountains while the Egyptians and republicans controlled the town and fortress. Mercenaries from France, Belgium and England, who had fought in Rhodesia, Malaya, Indochina, and Algeria were sent to assist the imam in planning, training, and giving the irregular forces the ability to communicate with one another and the Saudis. They trained tribesmen in the use of antitank weapons, such as the 106-mm gun, and in mining techniques. The number of mercenaries is estimated in the hundreds, although Egyptian sources at the time reported there were 15,000. Royalist tactics were confined to guerilla warfare, isolating conventional Egyptian and republican forces, and conducting attacks on supply lines.

==== British involvement 1962–1965 ====
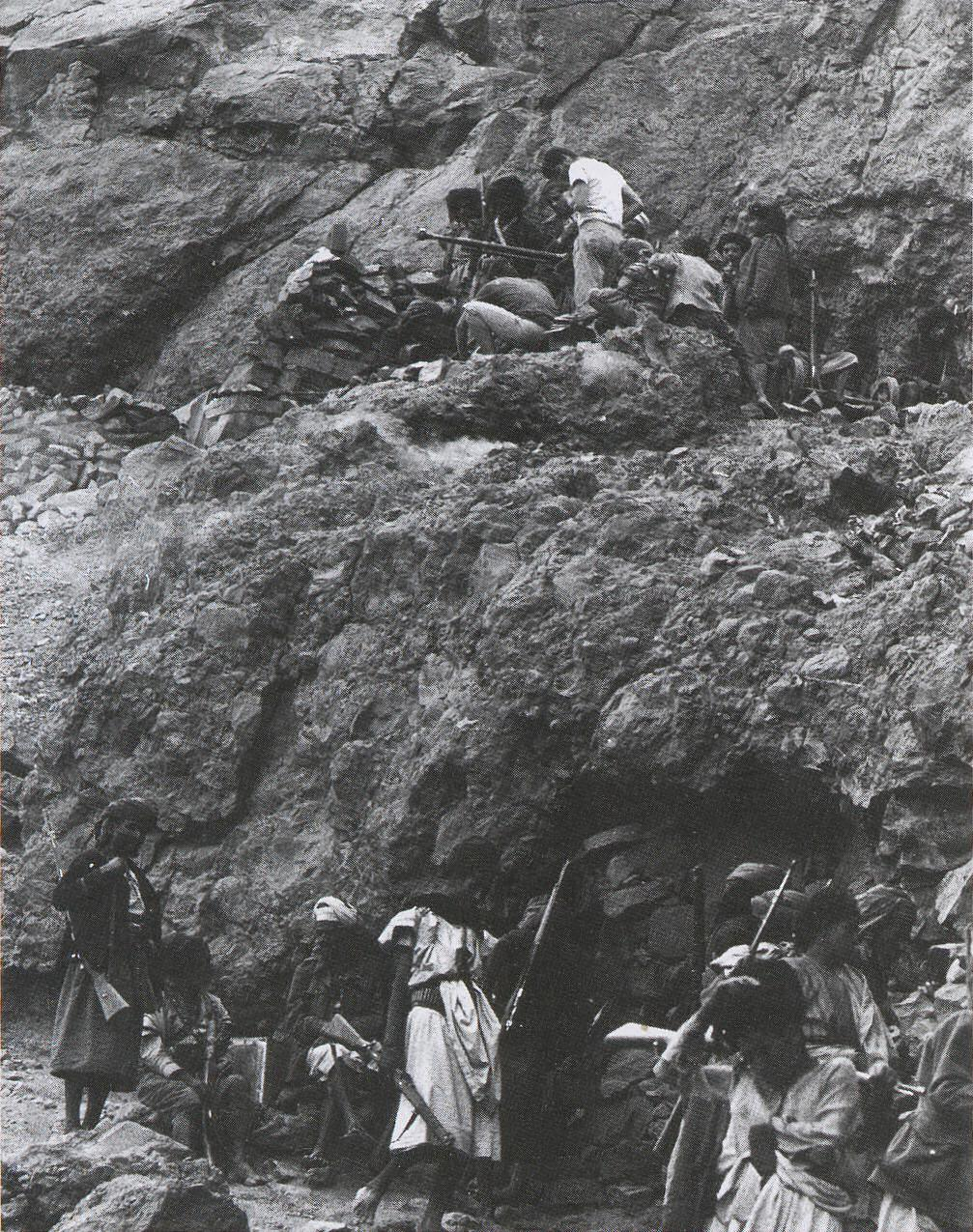
British mercenaries in the mountains of North Yemen helping Royalist rebels set up a heavy machine gun above a hideout cave

Between 1962 and 1965, Britain engaged in covert operations in support of Royalist forces fighting the Egyptian-backed Republican regime that had seized power in Yemen's capital, Sana'a, in September 1962. Until the end of 1965, the British presence in Aden was considered of high interest to the United Kingdom, linked to the realization of oil assets in the Middle East. The means to secure this presence however involved a bitter argument within the British government, with no coherency in decision making on the Yemen issue. The British objective was mainly keeping the Aden base via cooperation with the Federation of South Arabia, which complicated British relations with many global and regional players, as well as with the rulers of South Arabia themselves. The British involvement was executed mainly via the British Mercenary Organization (BMO), which was capable to stage its own covert operations, independent of London and away from the view of their sponsor Saudi Arabia. The BMO was specifically formed to train and support the royalists on the course of the war.

According to Duff Hart-Davis, the British mercenary leader Jim Johnson had originally considered buying his own aircraft, a Lockheed Constellation 749. He then flew to Teheran to try to persuade the Iranians to do an air drop. Hart-Davis further claims that success was finally achieved by an adviser to the mercenaries, the MP Neil "Billy" McLean, who privately (without the British government's knowledge) flew to Tel Aviv to meet Moshe Dayan, defense minister, and Meir Amit, head of Mossad. According to Haaretz, Tony Boyle contacted David Karon, the head of the Middle East department in the Tevel (Cosmos) section of the Mossad, and met with IAF commander Ezer Weizman and his officers. They was decided to conduct airdrops. Haaretz suggested the crew of the airdrops were British; while according to Hart-Davis the crew were Israeli (including the pilot named Arieh Oz), with Tony Boyle on board as an observer. Three decades after the war, former Mossad director, Shabtai Shavit, and Ariel Sharon both said Israel had been clandestinely involved in Yemen, though both remained vague concerning the nature and scale of the involvement. The airlifts were originally codenamed Operation Gravy, but were later renamed Operation Porcupine. The IAF's largest transport plane, a Stratofreighter, was recruited for the British operation. According to Jones, what is clear is that the British organized some of the mercenary air drops to the royalists (code-named "Mango") using aircraft, which were contracted privately from IAF to the British mercenary operation and were either using Israeli air bases or Israeli transport planes themselves making the drops.

According to Hart-Davis, the Israelis had systematically concealed the source of the weapons delivered by the mercenaries, brazing out all the serial numbers, using Italian parachutes, and even ensuring that the packaging consisted of wood-shavings from Cyprus. The contracted aircraft flew along the Saudi coastline. The Saudis did not have radar systems, and would later state they were not aware of the airlifts. The planes would make the drops and then refuel in French Somaliland (now Djibouti) and return to bases in Israel. The Porcupine operation continued over slightly more than two years, during which the Stratofreighter carried out 14 nighttime sorties from Tel Nof to Yemen.

British support to the royalists remained covert. Prime Minister Alec Douglas-Home replied to Michael Foot's parliamentary question on May 14, 1964, having, according to Hart-Davis "to skate across thin ice", by saying "Our policy towards the Yemen is one of non-intervention in the affairs of that country. It is not therefore our policy to supply arms to the Royalists in the Yemen, and the Yemen Government have not requested these or other forms of aid." To an addition question by George Wigg, Douglas-Home said that "at no time in the last eighteen months have British arms been supplied to the Imam's Government". Hart-Davis notes that this "may have been strictly true; but ... a great many weapons of non-British provenance had been spirited into the Yemen through Jim Johnson's machinations".

Their content was published by Al-Ahram and then broadcast by Cairo radio on May 1, 1964. Al-Ahram quoted an estimate for British, French, and other foreigners of "over 300 officers", "directed from Britain and most probably under the command of British Intelligence". On July 5, 1964, the Sunday Times published the letters, connecting "these Buchanesque freebooters" (Cooper and his team) with Tony Boyle.

However, the British Government was able to continue denying any knowledge of mercenary activity. On July 21, 1964, Douglas-Home replied to a parliamentary question by saying "Both the present High Commissioner and his predecessor have assured us that they were not aware that the person in question (Tony Boyle) was involved in any way". On July 22, 1964, Douglas-Home sent a memorandum to Foreign Secretary Rab Butler in which he "decreed that the United Kingdom should 'make life intolerable' for Nasser, 'with money and arms', and that this 'should be deniable if possible'". The result was that a secret Joint Action Committee was created to handle British policy on Yemen. The British support continued until 1965, when the Kingdom decided to abandon its Aden Colony.

==== Saudi and Jordanian support ====
Saudis and Jordanians provided an active support to the royalists through the first years of war. The September 1962 coup d'état in Yemen was perceived a threat to the monarchies in both Saudi Arabia and Jordan, prompting shipments of weapons to the royalists, beginning October 1. The support to the monarchists was quickly countered by the Egyptian aid to the Republicans, rapidly spiraling the country into a full-scale war, as the Republicans called for general mobilization and the Egyptians dispatched their troops. On November 4, with the war expanding across North Yemen, Mecca Radio reported Egyptian air force attacks on Saudi villages. The same day, a military alliance between Saudi Arabia and Jordan became widely known. Following the Egyptian raids on Saudi Arabia and the official Joint Defense Pact formed between Egypt and the Republicans, the Saudis decided to launch attacks on the Republicans in North Yemen.

The Jordanians withdrew from the war in 1963 by recognizing the Republicans, but the Saudi support continued. At some point, Saudi border towns and airfields were attacked by Egyptian forces in order to "prevent Saudi supplies and ammunition from reaching Royalist-held areas in the Yemen".

=== Republicans and Egyptian deployment ===
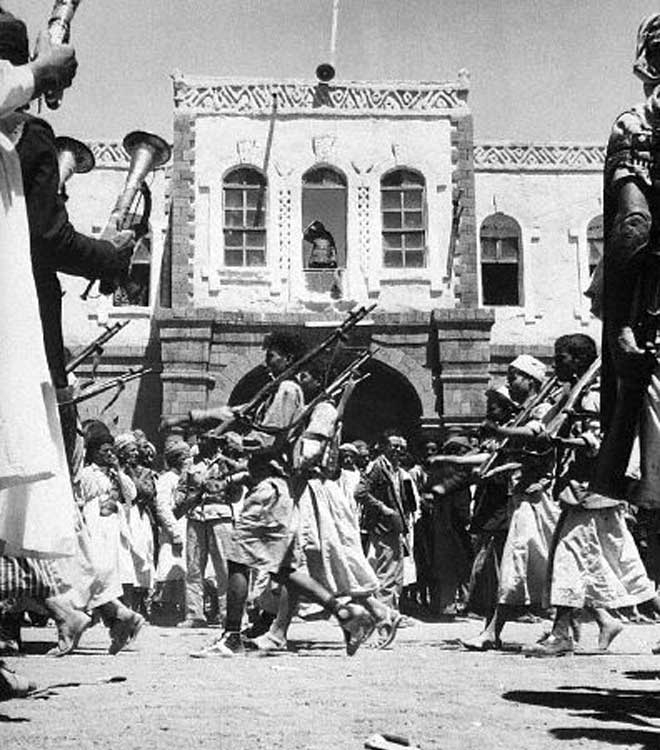
Pro-republican tribes marching in Sana'a.

Egypt supported republicans, and the Soviet Union supplied them with war plans. Anwar Sadat was convinced that a regiment reinforced with aircraft could firmly secure Al-Sallal and his free officer movement, but within three months of sending troops to Yemen, Nasser realized that this would require a larger commitment than anticipated. A little fewer than 5,000 troops were sent in October 1962. Two months later, Egypt had 15,000 regular troops deployed. By late 1963, deployment had increased to 36,000; and in late 1964, there were 50,000 Egyptian troops in Yemen. In late 1965, the Egyptian troop commitment in Yemen was at 55,000 troops, which were broken into 13 infantry regiments of 1 artillery division, 1 tank division and several Special Forces as well as paratroop regiments. Ahmed Abu-Zeid, who served as Egypt's ambassador to royalist Yemen from 1957 to 1961, sent numerous reports on Yemen that did not reach Ministry of Defense officials. He warned Egyptian officials in Cairo, including Defense Minister Amer, that the tribes were difficult and had no sense of loyalty or nationhood. He opposed sending Egyptian combat forces, arguing that only money and equipment be sent to the Yemeni Free Officers, and warned that the Saudis would finance the royalists.

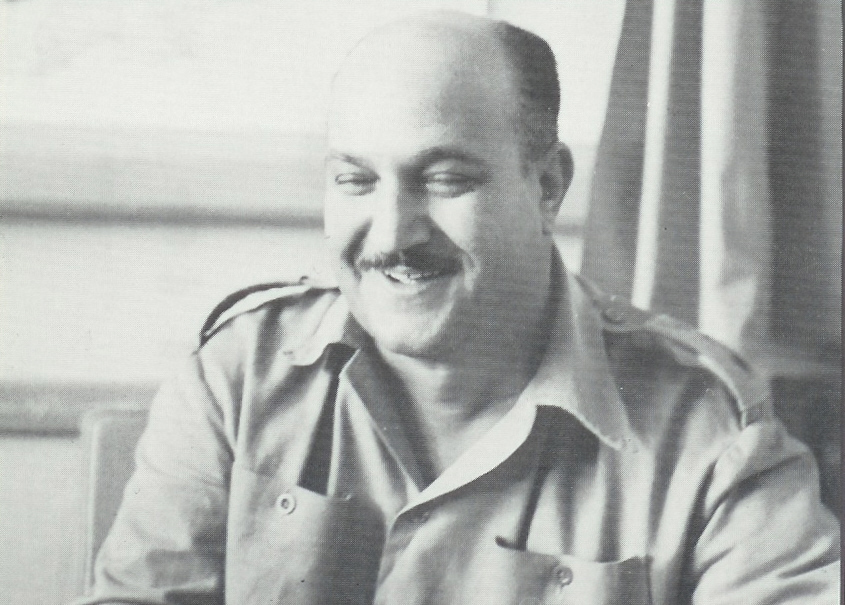
Brigadier Kamal Hassan Ali, Egyptian chief of operations, at his desk in Sanaa

Egyptian field commanders complained of a total lack of topographic maps, which caused a real problem in the first months of the war. Commanders had difficulty planning military operations effectively or sending back routine and casualty reports without accurate coordinates. Field units were given maps that were only useful for aerial navigation. Chief of Egyptian Intelligence Salah Nasr admitted that information on Yemen was nonexistent. Egypt had not had an embassy in Yemen since 1961; therefore when Cairo requested information from the US ambassador to Yemen, who only provided an economic report on the country.

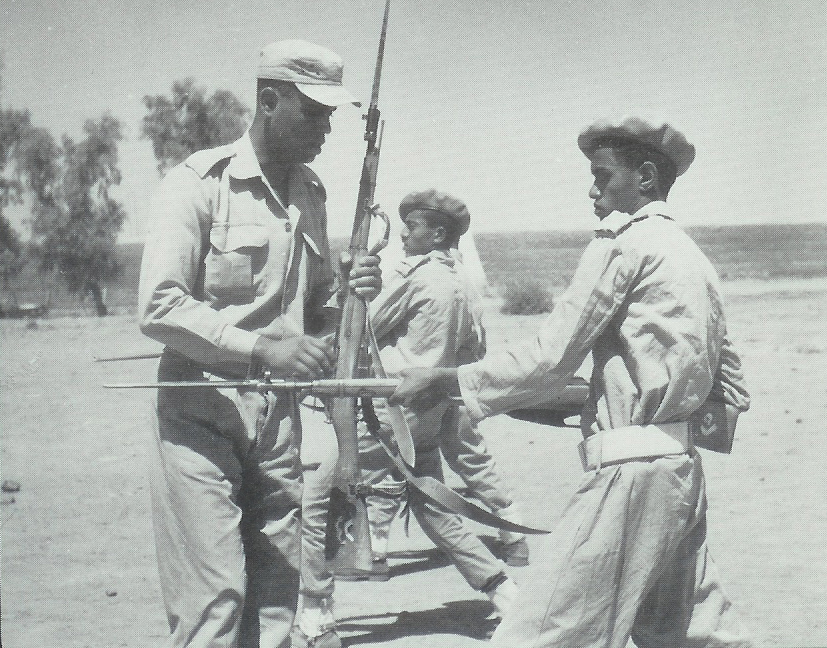
An Egyptian instructor at the San'a military academy showing a Yemeni how to use a bayonet affixed to a Mosin–Nagant rifle

In 1963 and 1964, the Egyptians had five squadrons of aircraft in Yemen at airfields near San'a and Hodeida. They were using Yak-11 piston-engined fighters, MiG-15 and MiG-17 jet fighters, Ilyushin Il-28 twin-engined bombers, Ilyushin Il-14 twin-engined transports, and Mil Mi-4 transport helicopters. They were also flying four-engined Tupolev bombers from Egyptian bases like Aswan. All the air crew were Egyptian, except for the Tupolev bombers, which were thought to have mixed Egyptian and Russian personnel. The Ilyushin transports flying between Egypt and Hodeida had Russian crews. Throughout the war, the Egyptians relied on airlift. In January 1964, when royalist forces placed San'a under siege, Egyptian Antonov heavy-lift cargo planes airlifted tons of food and kerosene into the region. The Egyptians estimate that hundreds of millions of dollars were spent to equip Egyptian and republican Yemeni forces. In addition, Moscow refurbished the Al-Rawda Airfield outside San'a. The politburo saw a chance to gain a toehold on the Arabian Peninsula and accepted hundreds of Egyptian officers to be trained as pilots for service in the Yemen War.

Egyptian air and naval forces began bombing and shelling raids in the southwestern Saudi city of Najran and the coastal town of Jizan, which were staging points for royalist forces. In response, the Saudis purchased a British Thunderbird air defense system and developed their airfield in Khamis Mushayt. Riyadh also attempted to convince the US to respond on its behalf. President Kennedy sent only a wing of jet fighters and bombers to Dhahran Airbase, demonstrating to Nasser the seriousness of American commitment to defending US interests in Saudi Arabia.

== Peace attempts: Khamir, Jeddah, and Haradh conferences ==
=== Khamir ===
Noman spoke over Radio San'a, offering reconciliation and inviting "all tribes of all persuasions" to meet with him the following week at Khamir, 50 miles north of San'a, to achieve "the one thing which we all prize over anything else: peace for the nation". To convince al-Badr to come the conference, Noman announced that he personally would head the republican delegation at Khamir, and that Sallal would stay in San'a. Al-Badr and his ranking chiefs did not attend the conference, but a handful of pro-royalist sheiks were present. The conference named a committee of five tribal and four religious leaders who were charged with seeking out the "beguiled brothers", al-Badr and his friends. Noman's effort, including a private promise to reach a withdrawal of Egyptian troops, was backed by Nasser. Radio Cairo hailed the Khamir conference as the "dawn of a new era". Sallal called the talks "a complete success", while al-Badr stated that "It is essential that the conflict which has devastated our beloved country be brought to an end by peaceful negotiations between the Yemeni people themselves." However, by early June, when Noman said that Egypt's 50,000 troops would have to be replaced by a joint royalist-republican peace force, the Nasserites lost interest in the deal. After Noman flew to Cairo to protest directly to Nasser, Sallal threw seven civilian cabinet ministers into jail. Noman resigned, saying "It is obvious that Sallal and his cronies are more interested in war than peace". Sallal soon named a new cabinet to replace Noman's, with thirteen military men and two civilians.

=== Jeddah ===
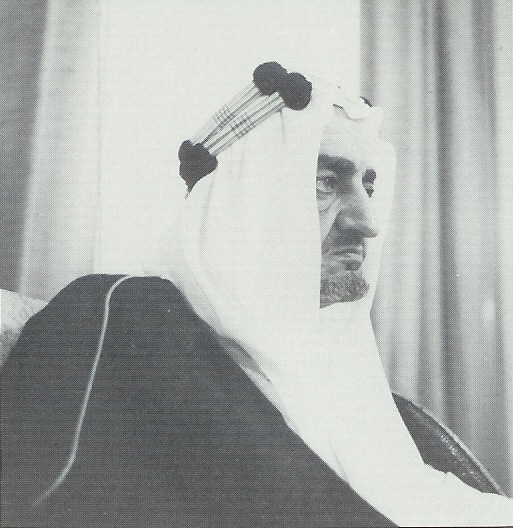
King Faisal at Jeddah

By August, the war was costing Nasser $1,000,000 a day, when he arrived in Jedda harbor aboard his presidential yacht Hurriah (Freedom) to negotiate with Faisal. It was Nasser's first visit to Saudi Arabia since 1956. At the Egyptians' request, due to assassination rumors, the banners and flags normally displayed to celebrate a visiting dignitary were omitted, the sidewalks were cleared of people, and the car was a special bulletproof model. On the evening of his arrival, Nasser was welcomed at a banquet and reception for 700 guests. In less than 48 hours, they reached full agreement. Once the agreement was signed, Faisal embraced Nasser and kissed him on both cheeks. The agreement provided for:

1. The gradual withdrawal of the Egyptian force within a 10-month period and the cessation of all Saudi help to the royalists; and
2. The formation of a Yemen Congress of 50, representing all factions, which would be charged with forming a transitional regime and establishing procedures for a national plebiscite to determine Yemen's future government.

=== Haradh ===
On November 23, the two sides met in Haradh. The first issue was the name of the transition state that was supposed to exist until a plebiscite could be held the following year. The royalists wanted the name "Kingdom of Yemen" but were willing to settle for a neutral title like "State of Yemen". The republicans insisted on having the word "republic" or "republican" in the title. It was agreed to suspend the conference until after Ramadan, which was about to begin the following week. The conference reached a stalemate when the Egyptians, possibly due to a tactical decision made by Amer, encouraged the republicans to take a headstrong stand.

== See also ==
- Aden Emergency
- Bruce Conde
- Houthi takeover in Yemen
- List of modern conflicts in the Middle East
- List of wars involving Saudi Arabia
- Mutawakkilite Kingdom of Yemen
- Saudi Arabian–led intervention in Yemen
- Houthi insurgency in Yemen

== Bibliography ==
=== Arabic sources ===
- al-Ashwal, Naji Ali (1988). الجيش والحركة الوطنية في اليمن، 1919-1969 م: دراسة تاريخية عسكرية سياسية [The Army and the National Movement in Yemen, 1919-1969: A Military-Political Historical Study] (in Arabic). d.n.
- al-Baydani, Abd al-Rahman (1984). أزمة الأمة العربية وثورة اليمن [The Crisis of the Arab Nation and the Yemeni Revolution] (in Arabic) (3rd ed.). Cairo: d.n. p. 320.
- al-Eryani, Abd al-Rahman. مذكرات الرئيس القاضي عبدالرحمن بن يحيى الإرياني [Memoirs of President al-Eryani] (in Arabic). Vol. Part Two.
- al-Maswari, Hussein Muhammad (2008). أوراق من ذكرياتي [Pages from My Memories] (in Arabic).
- al-Muqaddami, Hussein Abdullah (2004). ذكريات وحقائق للتاريخ [Memories and Facts for History] (in Arabic). p. 128.
- al-Sandi, Ahmad Qaid (1983). حركة المعارضة اليمنية في عهد الإمام يحيى بن محمد حميد الدين [The Yemeni Opposition Movement during the Era of Imam Yahya bin Muhammad Hamid al-Din] (in Arabic). مركز الدراسات والبحوث اليمنية.
- al-Shami, Ali (n.d.). ثورة 26 سبتمبر (دراسات وشهادات للتاريخ) [The 26 September Revolution: Studies and Testimonies for History] (in Arabic). Yemeni Center for Studies and Research. p. 338.
- Juzaylan, Abdullah (2019). التاريخ السري للثورة اليمنية 1956-1962 [The Secret History of the Yemeni Revolution 1956-1962] (in Arabic). p. 210.

=== English sources ===
- Badeeb, Saeed M (1986). The Saudi-Egyptian Conflict Over North Yemen, 1962-1970. Avalon Publishing. ISBN 9780813372969.
- Dresch, Paul (2000). A History of Modern Yemen. Cambridge; New York: Cambridge University Press. ISBN 978-0-521-79092-5. OCLC 43657092.
- Dresch, Paul (1994). Tribes, Government, and History in Yemen. New York: Oxford University Press. p. 480. ISBN 978-0-19-827790-3. OCLC 19623719.
- Elbaz, Yogev (2022). "Beyond the Periphery—Israel's Intervention in the Yemen Civil War in the 1960s". Israel Studies. 27 (1). Indiana University Press: 84–107. doi:10.2979/israelstudies.27.1.04. ISSN 1084-9513. JSTOR 10.2979/israelstudies.27.1.04.
- Ferris, Jesse (2013). Nasser's Gamble: How Intervention in Yemen Caused the Six-Day War and the Decline of Egyptian Power. Princeton University Press.
- Hart-Davis, Duff (2011). The War That Never Was: The True Story of the Men Who Fought Britain's Most Secret Battle. Random House. ISBN 978-1-84605-825-7. OCLC 760081166.

— (paperback edition), London: Arrow Books, 2012. OCLC 772967969. ISBN 978-0-099-55329-8.

- Jones, Clive (2004). Britain and the Yemen Civil War, 1962–1965: Ministers, Mercenaries and Mandarins: Foreign Policy and the Limits of Covert Action. Brighton; Portland Or.: Sussex Academic Press. ISBN 978-1-903900-23-9. OCLC 54066312.
- Kadri, Jude (2021). "Impact of 1962-68 North Yemen War on Cold War Balance of Power". Middle East Critique. 30 (3): 265–286. doi:10.1080/19436149.2021.1957562. ISSN 1943-6149.
- O'Ballance, Edgar (1971). The War in the Yemen. Archon Books.
- Orkaby, Asher (2017). Beyond the Arab Cold War: The International History of the Yemen Civil War, 1962–68. Oxford: Oxford University Press. ISBN 978-019-061844-5. OCLC 972901480.
- Rahmy, Ali Abdel Rahman (1983). The Egyptian Policy in the Arab World Intervention in Yemen, 1962-1967: Case Study. Washington, D.C: University Press of America. OCLC 9082857.
- Schmidt, Dana Adams (1968). Yemen: The Unknown War. New York: Holt, Rinehart, and Winston. LCCN 68024747. OCLC 443591.
- Witty, David M. (2001). "A Regular Army in Counterinsurgency Operations: Egypt in North Yemen, 1962-1967". The Journal of Military History. 65 (2): 401. doi:10.2307/2677166. JSTOR 2677166.
