= Ceclava Czapska =

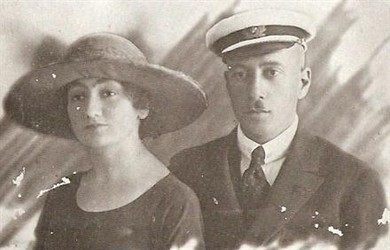
- With husband Nicolas Dolgoruky in 1919.
- Born: 2 January 1899
- Died: 1 December 1970 (aged 71); Rome, Italy
- Other names: Cécile Czapska; Ceclava di Fonzo Czapska; Ceclava Dolgoruky
- Known for: Romanov impostor who claimed to be the Grand Duchess Maria
- Spouse: Prince Nicolas Alexandrovich Dolgoruky

Ceclava Czapska (Cécile Czapska) (Bucharest 2 January 1899 – 1 December 1970) was a Romanov impostor who claimed to be the Grand Duchess Maria, daughter of Tsar Nicholas II, the last autocratic ruler of Imperial Russia, and his wife Tsarina Alexandra.

== Biography ==
She was the daughter of Polish nobleman, Bolesław Czapski and Raja Ludmilla Tchaplina. On 20 January 1919, she and Prince Nikolai Alexandrovich Dolgoruky (1898-1970), called 'di Fonz,' were married in Romania.

They had two daughters, Olga-Béata (born 1927), mother of Alexis Brimeyer; and Julia-Yolande (born 1937).

She died in Rome. Her grave is in Prima Porta.

The remains of all the Romanovs have been found and identified via DNA testing disproving her claim.

== Sources ==
- Cécile Czapska
- La zarina y sus cuatro hijas sobrevivieron a la matanza de la familia imperial rusa
- Martha Schad Wielkie dynastie. Mit i historia – Romanowowie, Warsaw 2003, s. 72.
- Le Parchemin, n°225, 1983, pp. 273–277
