= Alexis Brimeyer =

Romanov impostor

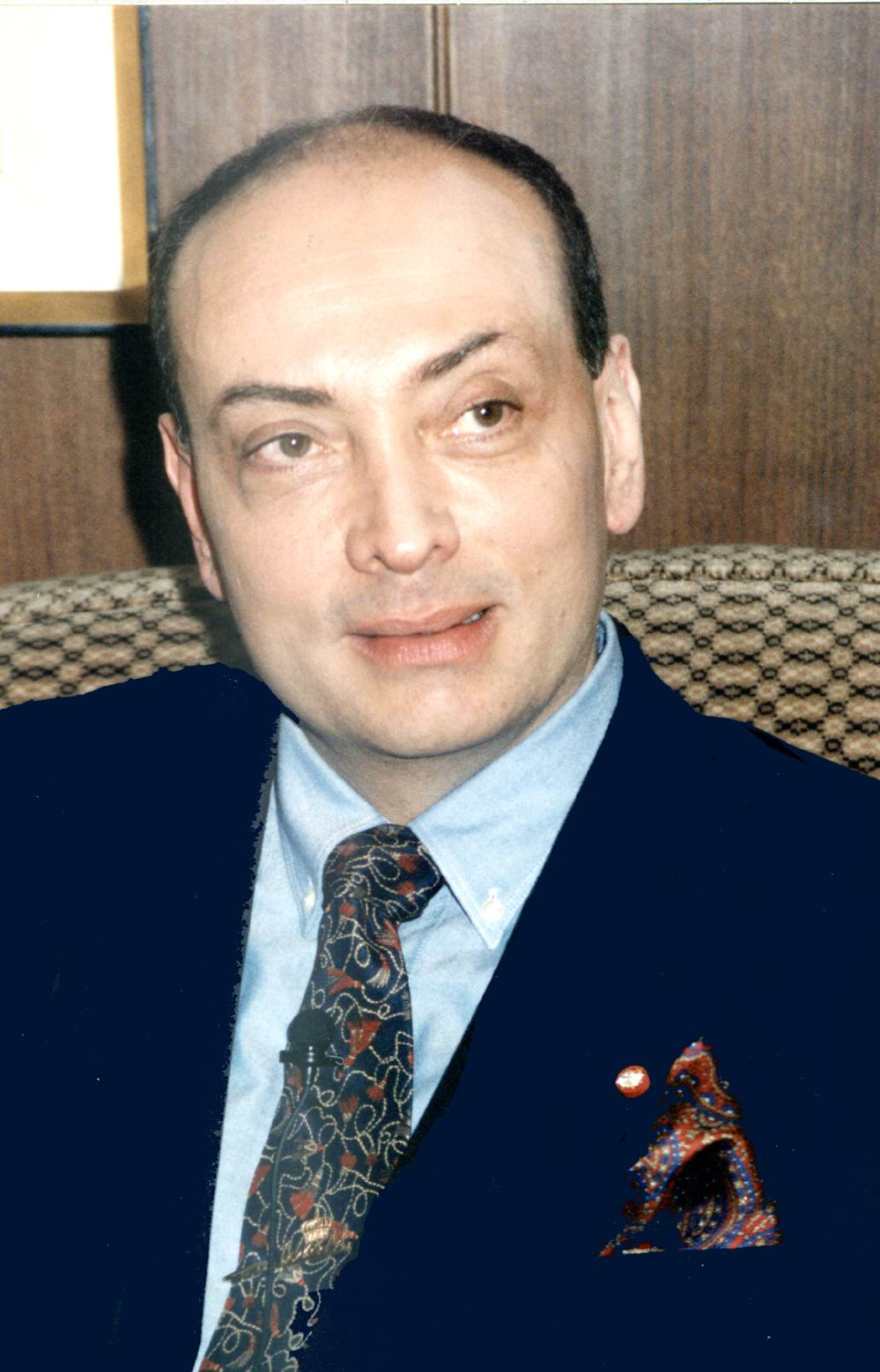
- Born: 4 May 1946; Costermansville, Belgian Congo (now Bukavu, Democratic Republic of the Congo)
- Died: 27 January 1995 (aged 48); Madrid, Spain
- Parent(s): Victor Brimeyer; Beatrice Dolgoruky

Alex Ceslaw Maurice Jean Brimeyer (4 May 1946 – 27 January 1995) was a pretender who claimed connection to various European thrones. He used fraudulent combined titles such as "Prince d'Anjou Durazzo Durassow Romanoff Dolgorouki de Bourbon-Condé". He authored the highly controversial book, Moi Petit-Arriere-Fils du Tsar. He also sold false titles of nobility through "orders" that he and his associates had created.

== Early life ==
Alex Brimeyer was born on 4 May 1946 in Costermansville (now Bukavu, Democratic Republic of the Congo). His parents were the engineer Victor Brimeyer and his wife, Beatrice Dolgoruky, daughter of Ceclava Czapska.

== Noble pretender ==
Brimeyer's first attempt to ennoble himself came when he adopted the name Brimeyer de la Calchuyére in the 1950s, at about ten years of age. This came to nothing. In 1955, he adopted the title His Serene Highness Prince Khevenhüller-Abensberg, but the real Princess Khevenhüller threatened to sue him. He withdrew the claim and apologized. Brimeyer also wrote to a number of aristocrats in an attempt to persuade them to adopt him. In 1969, he received a passport from the Principality of Sealand with the name His Highness Prince Alexis Romanov Dolgorouki. When he contacted a Brussels Orthodox priest, Jean Maljinowski, to be baptized, the priest was suspicious since the supposed prince did not speak a word of Russia.

He commissioned two death certificates to be published in Le Soir. Through them, he claimed that Nikolai Dolgorouki, his supposed father, had used a pseudonym of Nicholas di Fonzo to escape the October Revolution and lived under the name. In actuality, the Bolsheviks executed the real Nikolai Dolgorouki after the Revolution.

== Khevenhüller trial ==
Princess von Khevenhüller-Metsch, Princess Maria Dolgoroukova and Prince Alexander Pavlovich Dolgorouki sued Brimeyer. They charged that Brimeyer was using their noble titles with malicious intent. The prosecutor presented a large number of fraudulent documents, including letters where Emperor Charles V supposedly ennobles Brimeyer. The court noted that his claim of marriage between his "grandfather", Prince Dolgorouki, and his "grandmother", Maria Nikolaevna (who was long mistakenly thought by some to have survived the execution of the Romanov family in July 1918), was false. On 24 November 1971, Brimeyer was sentenced to jail for 18 months but had fled to Greece from where he sent a letter to the prosecutor. In it he claimed descent from the Emperors of Byzantium.

In Greece Brimeyer presented himself in the police station, and said that his passport had been stolen. He requested temporary documents. He registered then himself as Alexis Romanov Dolgorouki and for the next ten years he used those documents to "prove" his status.

== "I, Alexis, Great Grandson of the Tsar" ==
In 1979 Brimeyer was living in Spain and contacted the cadet line of the Anjou Durassos. He convinced some of them to give their support and recognize him as the head of the royal house of Anjou-Durazzo. In 1982 he published a book "I, Alexis, Great Grandson of the Tsar" by "H.R.H. Prince Alexis d'Anjou Romanov-Dolgorouki, Duke of Durazzo". The book included a "will" where Vassili d'Anjou Durassow supposedly recognized him as his only son. Thus he claimed connection to the Capetian House of Anjou and the throne of Naples.

Alexis was certain that Victor Brimeyer was not his father. He claimed that after his mother divorced Brimeyer she married Vassili d'Anjou Durassow on 15 April 1947 and that he was born in 1948. This supposed marriage was then annulled and she married Prince Igor Dolgorouki on 6 September 1948, divorcing him shortly thereafter and marrying Joseph Fabry in 1950.

== Ties to the House of Condé ==
In August 1984, Alexis' mother, Beatrice, married Bruce Conde, an imposter to the Princes of Condé. After the wedding, he adopted Brimeyer. This gave Alexis an excuse to add the title Bourbon-Condé.

== Ties to Russia ==
Next, Alexis claimed that as his father was the son of Prince Dolgorouki and that Prince Dolgorouki had married the supposedly escaped Grand Duchess Maria Nikolaevna of Russia, and that his mother was their only daughter.

Alexis claimed that his grandfather had been elected Volodar of Ukraine and persuaded a few orthodox priests that he was the heir to a throne. Through the Grand Duchess, Alexis claimed a connection to the Romanovs and the Russian throne.

== Serbian throne ==
He sent numerous letters to King Juan Carlos of Spain and demanded his recognition. He married and had a son. He also managed to convince the British College of Arms to include himself in documents. Lord Mountbatten of Burma wrote to him on 3 January 1977, addressing him as Prince Dolgorouky as a courtesy.

In 1992, two Greater Serbian nationalists, including Vojislav Šešelj, visited Brimeyer in Spain. Supposedly they offered him the throne of Serbia. He told journalists that he had been in touch with Slobodan Milošević, who was supposedly in favor of restoring the Serbian monarchy. Then he used the title, "Prince Alexis II Nemanitch Romanov Dolgorouki", Grand Master of the Order of Saint John of Jerusalem. He had convinced his Serbian nationalist supporters that he was descended, in a very convoluted manner, from Hrebeljanović-Nemanjić dynasty.

Alexis claimed to have accepted the throne of Serbia. There appeared to be at least some support for him. The European Monarchist Association published a communiqué, where it stated Brimeyer's real identity. The scheme then appears to have collapsed.

== Death ==
Alexis Brimeyer died of HIV/AIDS in Madrid, aged 48, on 27 January 1995.

== See also ==
- Romanov impostors
- Bruce Conde
