= Murder of the Romanov family =

1918 mass murder in Yekaterinburg, Russia

- Part of the Red Terror during the Russian Civil War
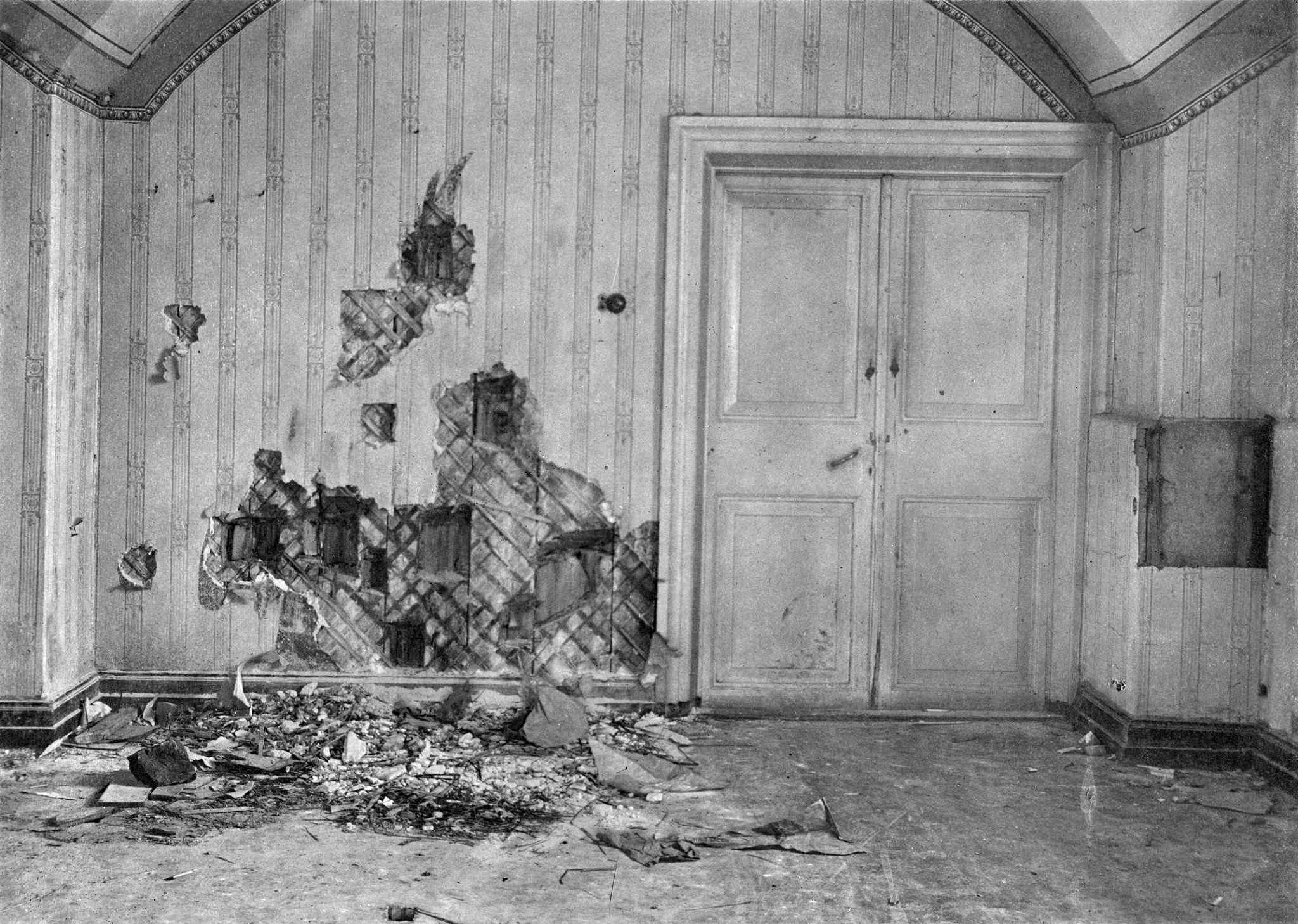
- The basement where the Romanov family and their retainers were killed
- Location: 56°50′39″N 60°36′35″E; Ipatiev House, Yekaterinburg, Russia
- Date: 16–17 July 1918, 108 years ago
- Target: Romanov family and their retainers
- Attack type: Regicide, mass murder, extrajudicial killing, execution
- Weapons: Mauser C96 (Yurovsky & Ermakov); Colt M1911 (Yurovsky & Kudrin); FN M1900; FN M1906 (Nikulin); Smith & Wesson revolver; Nagant M1895s; Bayonets
- Deaths: 11
- Perpetrator: Bolshevik revolutionaries under Yakov Yurovsky on instructions from the Ural Regional Soviet (Note: Members of the Presidium of the Ural Executive Council: 1. Alexander Beloborodov (Chairman); 2. Boris Didkovsky (Vice Chairman); 3. Filipp Goloshchyokin; 4. Georgy Safarov; 5. Nikolay Tolmachyov)

Members of the Romanov family–the former Emperor Nicholas II of Russia, Empress Alexandra, and their children, Olga, Tatiana, Maria, Anastasia, and Alexei–were shot and stabbed to death by Bolshevik revolutionaries under Yakov Yurovsky on the orders of the Ural Regional Soviet in Yekaterinburg on the night of 16–17 July 1918. Also killed that night were members of the imperial entourage who had accompanied them: court physician Eugene Botkin; lady-in-waiting Anna Demidova; footman Alexei Trupp; and head cook Ivan Kharitonov. The bodies were taken to the Koptyaki forest, where they were stripped, mutilated with grenades and acid to prevent identification, and buried.

Following the February Revolution in 1917, the Romanovs and their servants had been imprisoned in the Alexander Palace before being moved to Tobolsk, Siberia, in the aftermath of the October Revolution. They were next moved to a house in Yekaterinburg, near the Ural Mountains, before they were murdered in July 1918. The Bolsheviks initially announced only Nicholas's death. For the next eight years, the Soviet leadership maintained a systematic web of disinformation regarding his family, making claims ranging from murder by left-wing revolutionaries in September 1919, to outright denial of their deaths in April 1922.

In 1926 the Soviet regime acknowledged the killings of the entire family (following a French republishing of a 1919 investigation by a White émigré) but claimed the bodies were destroyed and that Lenin's Cabinet was not responsible. The Soviet cover-up of the murders fuelled rumors of survivors. Various Romanov impostors claimed to be members of the Romanov family, which drew media attention away from the activities of Soviet Russia.

In 1979, amateur detective Alexander Avdonin discovered the burial site. The Soviet Union did not acknowledge the existence of these remains publicly until 1989 during the Glasnost period. The identities of the remains were confirmed by forensic and DNA analysis and investigation in 1994, with the assistance of British experts. In 1998, eighty years after the killings, the remains of the Romanovs were reinterred in a state funeral in the Peter and Paul Cathedral in Saint Petersburg. The funeral was not attended by key members of the Russian Orthodox Church, who disputed the authenticity of the remains. In 2007, a second, smaller grave which contained the remains of two of the Romanov children, missing from the larger grave, was discovered by amateur archaeologists; those remains were confirmed to be from Alexei and a sister—either Anastasia or Maria—by DNA analysis. In 2008, after considerable and protracted legal wrangling, the Russian prosecutor general's office rehabilitated the Romanov family as "victims of political repressions". A criminal case was opened by the Russian government in 1993, but nobody was prosecuted on the basis that the perpetrators were dead.

According to the official state version of the Soviet Union, the imperial family and retinue were killed by firing squad by order of the Ural Regional Soviet. Historians have debated whether the execution was sanctioned by Moscow leadership. Some Western historians attribute the execution order to the government in Moscow, specifically Vladimir Lenin and Yakov Sverdlov, who wanted to prevent the rescue of the imperial family by the approaching Czechoslovak Legion during the Russian Civil War. This is supported by a passage in Leon Trotsky's diary. However, other historians have cited documented orders from the All-Russian Central Committee of the Soviets preferring a public trial for Nicholas II with Trotsky as chief prosecutor and his family spared.

A 2011 investigation concluded that, despite the opening of state archives in the post-Soviet years, no written document has been found which proves Lenin or Sverdlov ordered the executions. However, they endorsed the killings after they occurred.

== Background ==
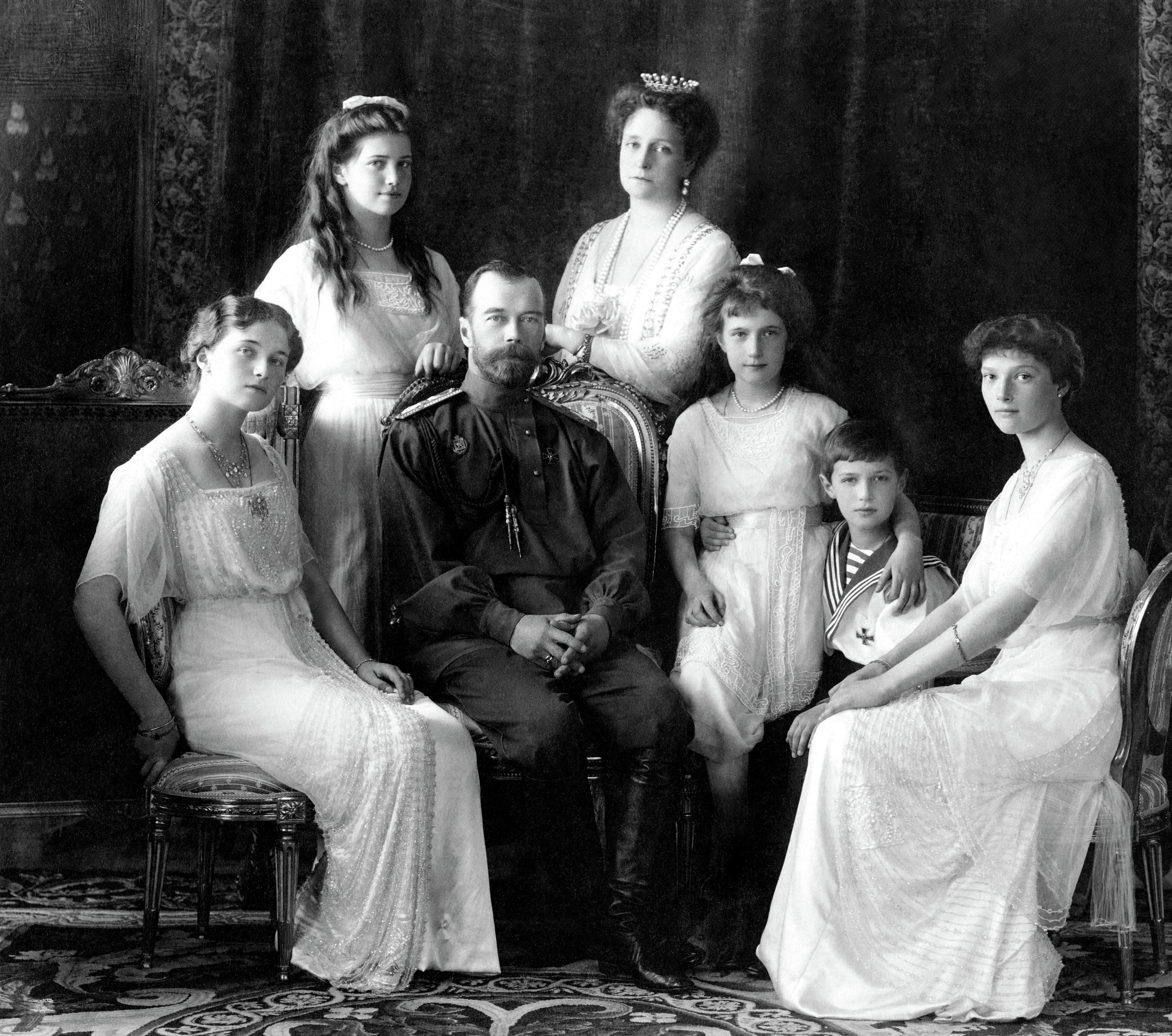
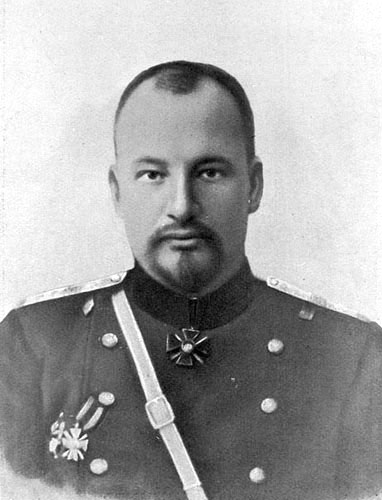
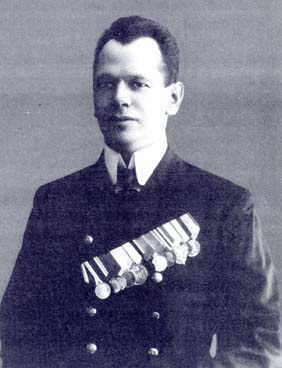
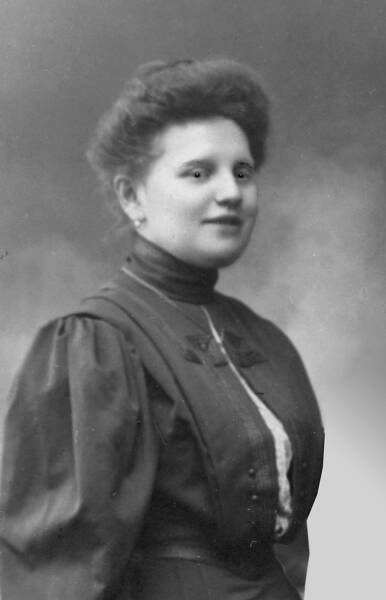
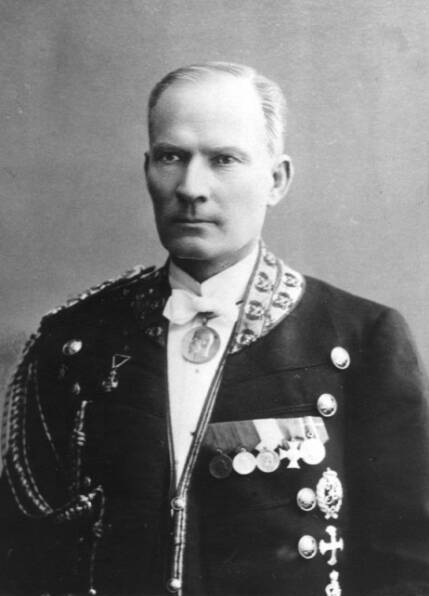
From top: the Romanov family, Eugene Botkin, Ivan Kharitonov, Anna Demidova, and Alexei Trupp

On March 7th while his family was in Tsarskoye Selo, Nicholas was stuck in Stavka. He kept in touch with Alexandra through several letters, in which they expressed how much they missed each other. Shortly following his abdication on March 15th, Tsar Nicholas II, addressed by the sentries as "Nicholas Romanov", was reunited with his family at the Alexander Palace in Tsarskoye Selo, on March 22nd. He was placed under house arrest with his family by the Provisional Government, and the family was surrounded by guards and confined to their quarters. During this time Alexandra recorded in her diary the temperatures of her children, specifically Alexei, Tatiana, and Olga who were ill.

In August 1917, after a failed attempt to send the Romanovs to the United Kingdom, where the ruling monarch, King George V, was the mutual first cousin of Nicholas and his wife Alexandra, Alexander Kerensky's provisional government evacuated the Romanovs to Tobolsk, Siberia, allegedly to protect them from the rising tide of revolution. There they lived in the former governor's mansion in considerable comfort. The justice minister in charge of handling the family's arrest, Kerensky, highlighted in his speeches how he hopes this treatment will cause Nicholas to feel ashamed of the “horrors that had been perpetuated in his name”. However the guards were cruel towards the family and often scribbled insulting graffiti on the walls and benches. After the Bolsheviks came to power in October 1917, the conditions of their imprisonment grew stricter as talk within the government of putting Nicholas on trial grew more frequent. Nicholas was forbidden to wear epaulettes, and the sentries scrawled lewd drawings on the fence to offend his daughters. On 1 March 1918, the family was placed on soldiers' rations. Their ten servants were dismissed, and they had to give up butter and coffee.

As the Bolsheviks gathered strength, the government moved Nicholas, Alexandra, and their daughter Maria to Yekaterinburg under the direction of Vasily Yakovlev in April 1918. Alexei, who had severe haemophilia, was too ill to accompany his parents and remained with his sisters Olga, Tatiana, and Anastasia, not leaving Tobolsk until May. The family was imprisoned with their few remaining retainers in Yekaterinburg's Ipatiev House, which was designated the House of Special Purpose (Russian: Дом Особого Назначения, romanized: Dom Osobogo Naznacheniya):

All those under arrest will be held as hostages, and the slightest attempt at counter-revolutionary action in the town will result in the summary execution of the hostages.

— Announcement in the local newspaper by Bolshevik war commissar Filipp Goloshchyokin, in overall charge of the family's incarceration in Yekaterinburg.

=== House of Special Purpose ===
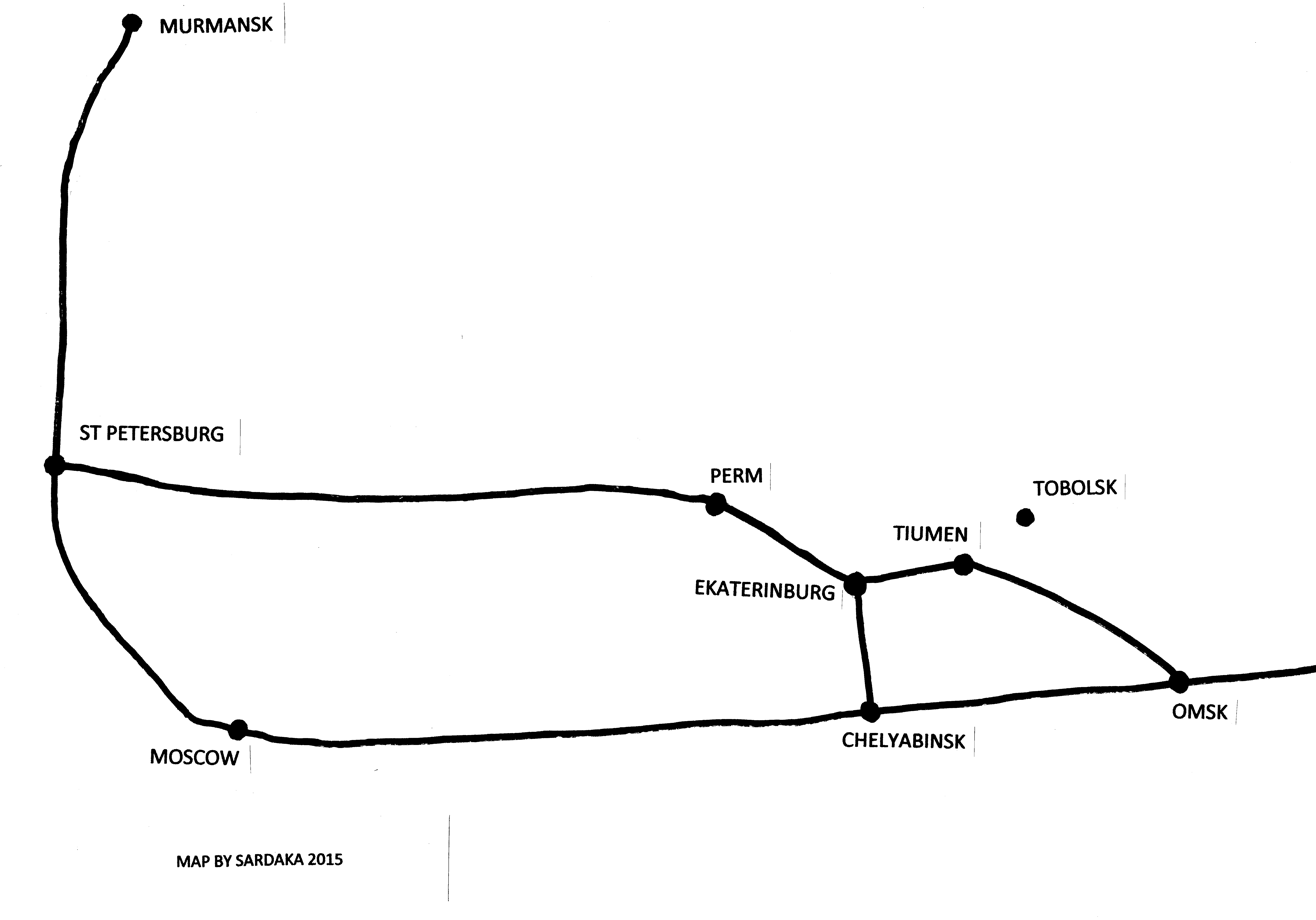
Location of the main events in the last days of the Romanov family, who were held at Tobolsk, Siberia, before being transported to Yekaterinburg, where they were killed.

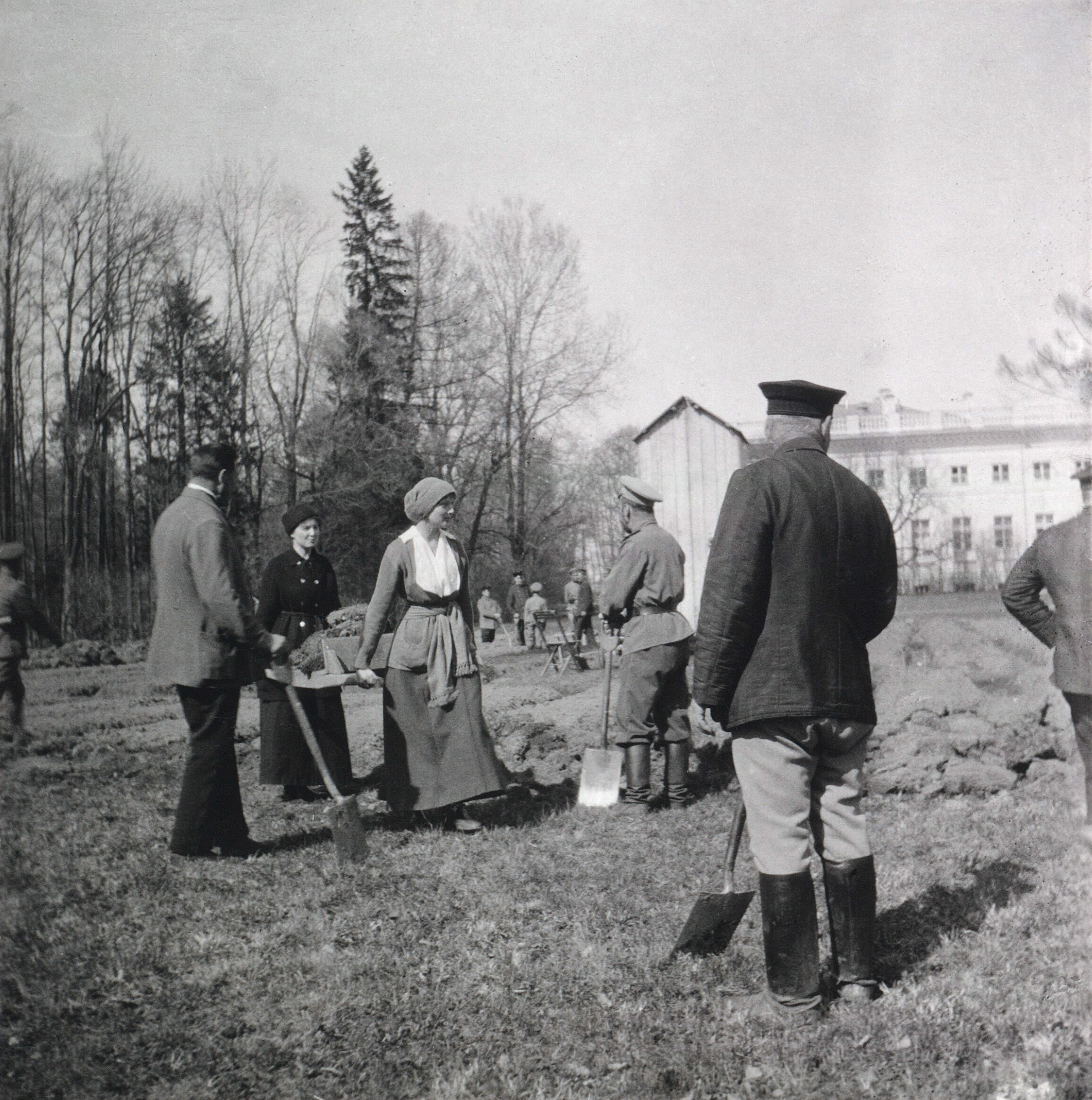
Nicholas II, Tatiana and Anastasia Hendrikova working on a kitchen garden at Alexander Palace in May 1917. The family was allowed no such indulgences at the Ipatiev House.

The Romanovs were kept in strict isolation at the Ipatiev House. They were forbidden to speak any language other than Russian and were not permitted access to their luggage, which was stored in a warehouse in the interior courtyard. Their Brownie cameras and photographic equipment were confiscated. The servants were ordered to address the Romanovs only by their names and patronymics. The imperial family was subjected to regular searches of their belongings, confiscation of their money for "safekeeping by the Ural Regional Soviet's treasurer", and attempts to remove Alexandra's and her daughters' gold bracelets from their wrists. The house was surrounded by a 4-metre-high (13 ft) double palisade that obscured the view of the streets from the house. The initial fence enclosed the garden along Voznesensky Lane. On 5 June a second palisade was erected, higher and longer than the first, which completely enclosed the property. The second palisade was constructed after it was learned that passersby could see Nicholas's legs when he used the double swing in the garden.

The windows in all the family's rooms were sealed shut and covered with newspapers (later painted with whitewash on 15 May). Their only source of ventilation was a fortochka in the grand duchesses' bedroom, but peeking out of it was strictly forbidden; in May a sentry fired a shot at Anastasia when she looked out. After the Romanovs made repeated requests, one of the two windows in the tsar and tsarina's corner bedroom was unsealed on 23 June 1918. The guards were ordered to increase their surveillance accordingly, and the prisoners were warned not to look out of the window or attempt to signal to anyone outside, on pain of being shot. From this window, they could see only the spire of the Voznesensky Cathedral located across the road from the house. An iron grille was installed on 11 July, after Alexandra had ignored repeated warnings from the commandant, Yakov Yurovsky, not to stand too close to the open window.

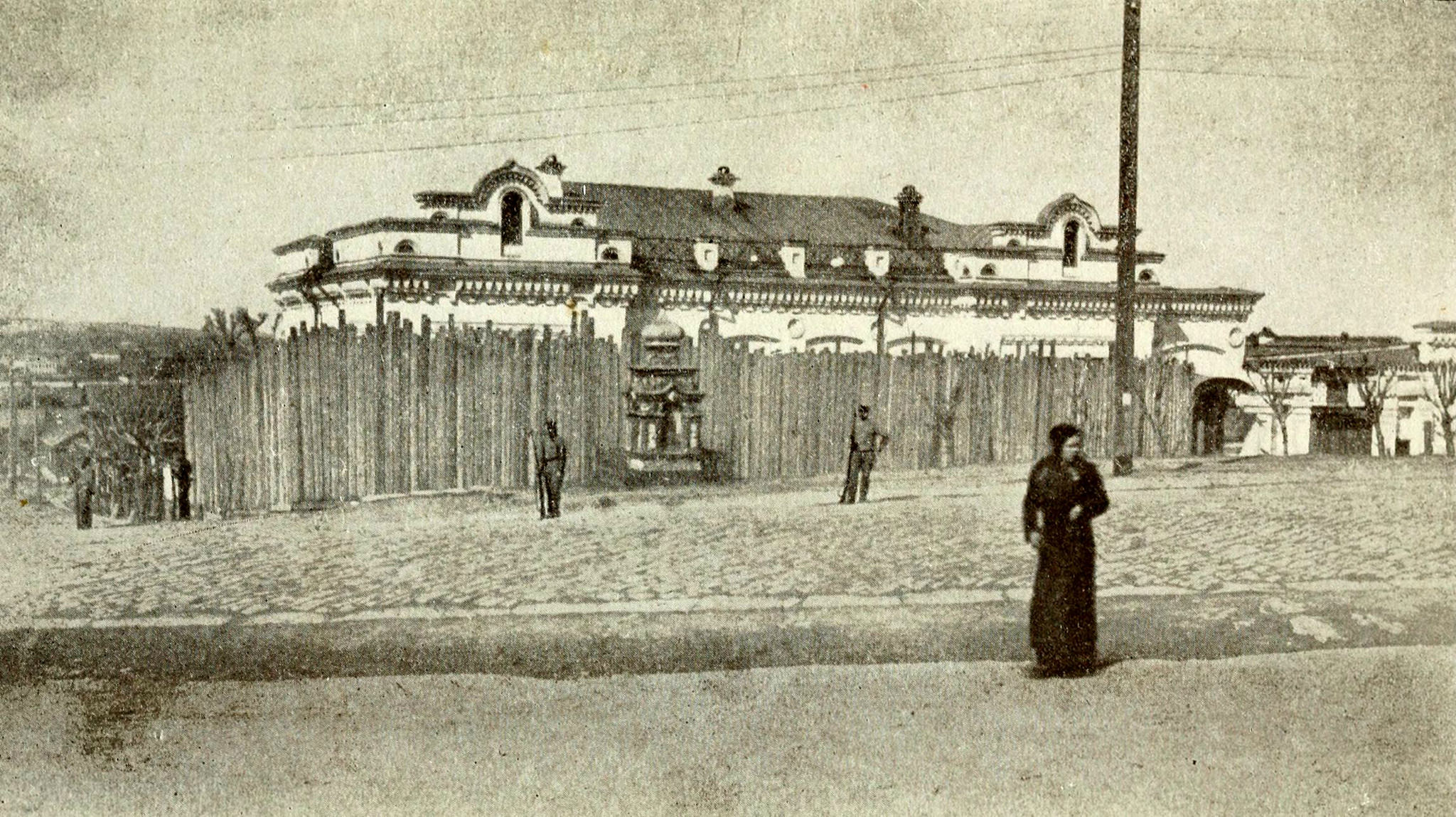
Ipatiev House, with the palisade erected just before Nicholas, Alexandra and Maria arrived on 30 April 1918. On the top left of the house is an attic dormer window where a Maxim gun was positioned. Directly below it was the tsar and tsarina's bedroom.

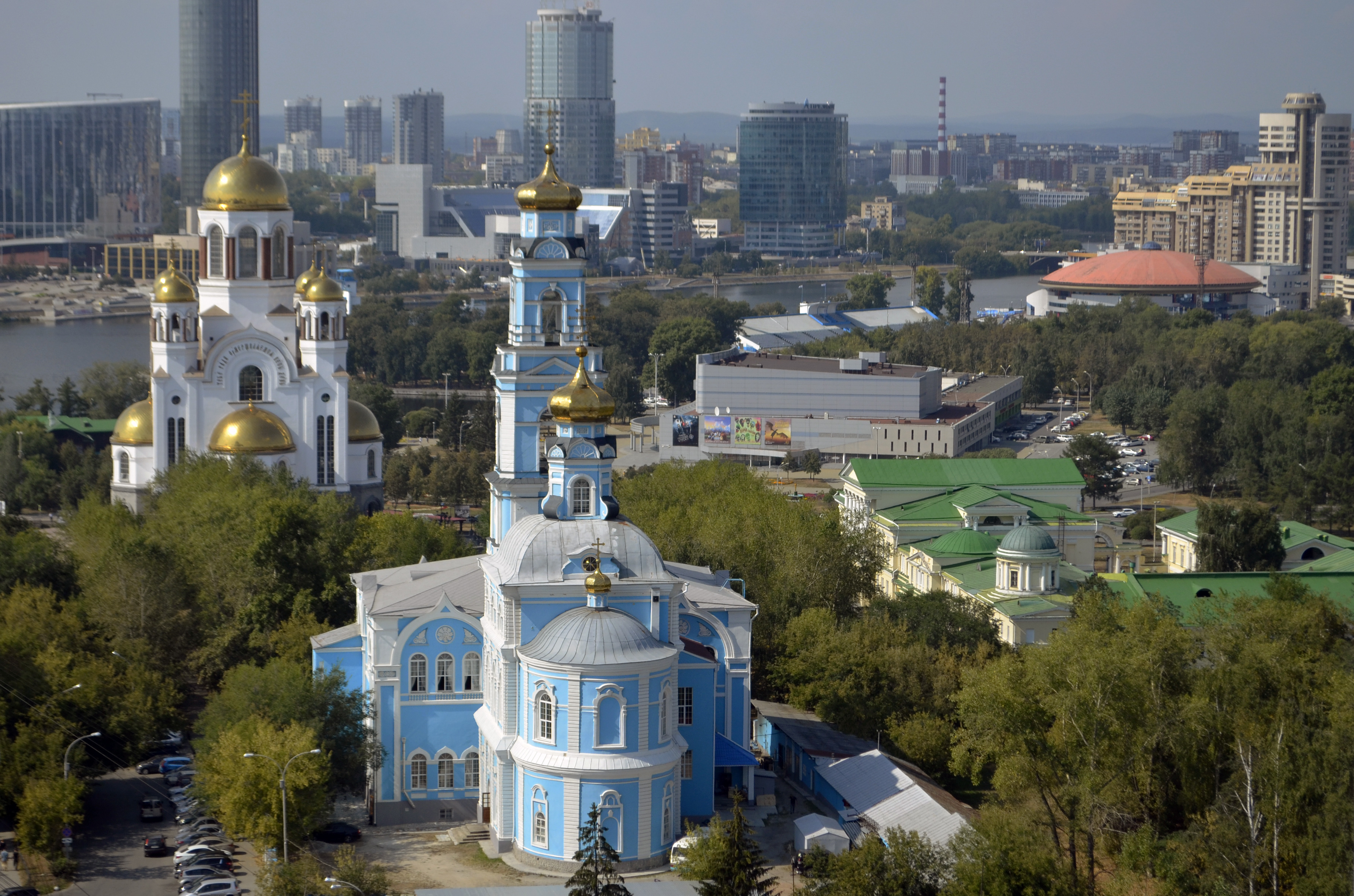
The Church of All Saints in 2016 (top left), where the Ipatiev House used to be. Voznesensky Cathedral is in the foreground, where a machine gun was mounted in the belfry aimed at the tsar and tsaritsa's bedroom on the southeastern corner of the house.

The guard commandant and his senior aides had complete access at any time to all rooms occupied by the family. The prisoners were required to ring a bell each time they wished to leave their rooms to use the bathroom and lavatory on the landing. Strict rationing of the water supply was enforced on the prisoners after the guards complained that it regularly ran out. Recreation was allowed only twice daily in the garden, for half an hour morning and afternoon. The prisoners were ordered not to engage in conversation with any of the guards. Rations were mostly tea and black bread for breakfast, and cutlets or soup with meat for lunch; the prisoners were informed that "they were no longer permitted to live like tsars". In mid-June, nuns from the Novo-Tikhvinsky Monastery also brought the family food on a daily basis, most of which the captors took when it arrived. The family was not allowed visitors or to receive and send letters. Princess Helen of Serbia visited the house in June but was refused entry at gunpoint by the guards, while Dr Vladimir Derevenko's regular visits to treat Alexei were curtailed when Yurovsky became commandant. No excursions to Divine Liturgy at the nearby church were permitted. In early June, the family no longer received their daily newspapers.

To maintain a sense of normality, the Bolsheviks lied to the Romanovs on 13 July 1918 that two of their loyal servants, Klimenty Nagorny (Alexei's sailor nanny) and Ivan Dmitrievich Sednev (OTMA's footman; Leonid Sednev's uncle), "had been sent out of this government" (i.e., out of the jurisdiction of Yekaterinburg and Perm province). In fact, both men were already dead: after the Bolsheviks had removed them from the Ipatiev House in May, they had been shot by the Cheka with a group of other hostages on 6 July, in reprisal for the death of Ivan Malyshev, Chairman of the Ural Regional Committee of the Bolshevik Party killed by the Whites. On 14 July, a priest and deacon conducted a liturgy for the Romanovs. The following morning, four housemaids were hired to wash the floors of the Popov House and Ipatiev House; they were the last civilians to see the family alive. On both occasions, they were under strict instructions not to engage in conversation with the family. Yurovsky always kept watch during the liturgy and while the housemaids were cleaning the bedrooms with the family.

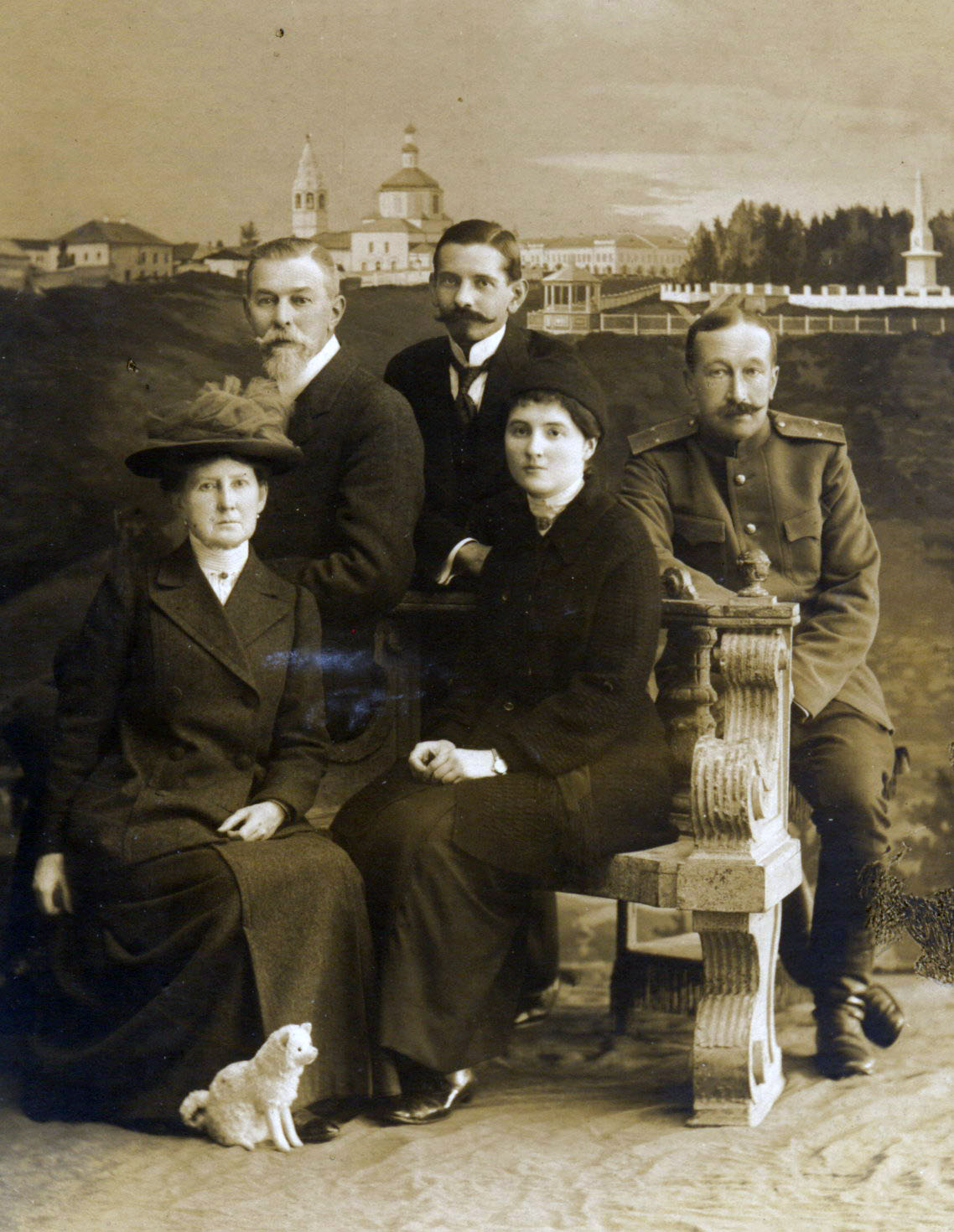
The Romanov entourage. From left to right: Catherine Schneider; Ilya Tatishchev; Pierre Gilliard; Anastasia Hendrikova; and Vasily Dolgorukov. They voluntarily accompanied the Romanov family into imprisonment but were forcibly separated by the Bolsheviks at Ekaterinburg. All except Gilliard were later murdered by the Bolsheviks.

The sixteen men of the internal guard slept in the basement, hallway, and commandant's office during shifts. The external guard, led by Pavel Medvedev, numbered 56 and took over the Popov House opposite. The guards were allowed to bring in women for sex and drinking sessions in the Popov House and basement rooms of the Ipatiev House. There were four machine gun emplacements: one in the bell tower of the Voznesensky Cathedral aimed toward the house; a second in the basement window of the Ipatiev House facing the street; a third monitoring the balcony overlooking the garden at the back of the house; and a fourth in the attic overlooking the intersection, directly above the tsar and tsarina's bedroom. Ten guard posts were located in and around the Ipatiev House, and the exterior was patrolled twice hourly day and night. In early May, the guards moved the piano from the dining room, where the prisoners could play it, to the commandant's office next to the Romanovs' bedrooms. The guards would play the piano, while singing Russian revolutionary songs and drinking and smoking. They also listened to the Romanovs' records on the confiscated phonograph. The lavatory on the landing was also used by the guards, who scribbled political slogans and crude graffiti on the walls. The number of Ipatiev House guards totaled 300 at the time the imperial family was killed.

When Yurovsky replaced Aleksandr Avdeev on 4 July, he moved the old internal guard members to the Popov House. The senior aides were retained but were designated to guard the hallway area and no longer had access to the Romanovs' rooms; only Yurovsky's men had it. The local Cheka chose replacements from the volunteer battalions of the Verkh-Isetsk factory at Yurovsky's request. He wanted dedicated Bolsheviks who could be relied on to do whatever was asked of them. They were hired on the understanding that they would be prepared, if necessary, to kill the tsar, about which they were sworn to secrecy. Nothing at that stage was said about killing the family or servants. To prevent a repetition of the fraternization that had occurred under Avdeev, Yurovsky chose mainly foreigners. Nicholas noted in his diary on 8 July that "new Latvians are standing guard", describing them as Letts – a term commonly used in Russia to classify someone as of European, non-Russian origin. The leader of the new guards was Adolf Lepa, a Lithuanian.

In mid-July 1918, forces of the Czechoslovak Legion were closing on Yekaterinburg, to protect the Trans-Siberian Railway, of which they had control. According to historian David Bullock, the Bolsheviks, falsely believing that the Czechoslovaks were on a mission to rescue the family, panicked and executed their wards. The Legions arrived less than a week later and on 25 July captured the city.

During the imperial family's imprisonment in late June, Pyotr Voykov and Alexander Beloborodov, president of the Ural Regional Soviet, directed the smuggling of letters written in French to the Ipatiev House. These claimed to be by a monarchist officer seeking to rescue the family, but were composed at the behest of the Cheka. These fabricated letters, along with the Romanov responses to them (written on either blank spaces or the envelopes), provided the Central Executive Committee (CEC) in Moscow with further justification to 'liquidate' the imperial family. Yurovsky later observed that, by responding to the faked letters, Nicholas "had fallen into a hasty plan by us to trap him". On 13 July, across the road from the Ipatiev House, a demonstration of Red Army soldiers, Socialist Revolutionaries, and anarchists was staged on Voznesensky Square, demanding the dismissal of the Yekaterinburg Soviet and the transfer of control of the city to them. This rebellion was violently suppressed by a detachment of Red Guards led by Peter Ermakov, which opened fire on the protesters, all within earshot of the tsar and tsarina's bedroom window. The authorities exploited the incident as a monarchist-led rebellion that threatened the security of the captives at the Ipatiev House.

We like this man less and less.

— Diary entry of Tsar Nicholas II, referring to the constant tightening of restrictions on his family by Yurovsky.

=== Planning for the murders ===
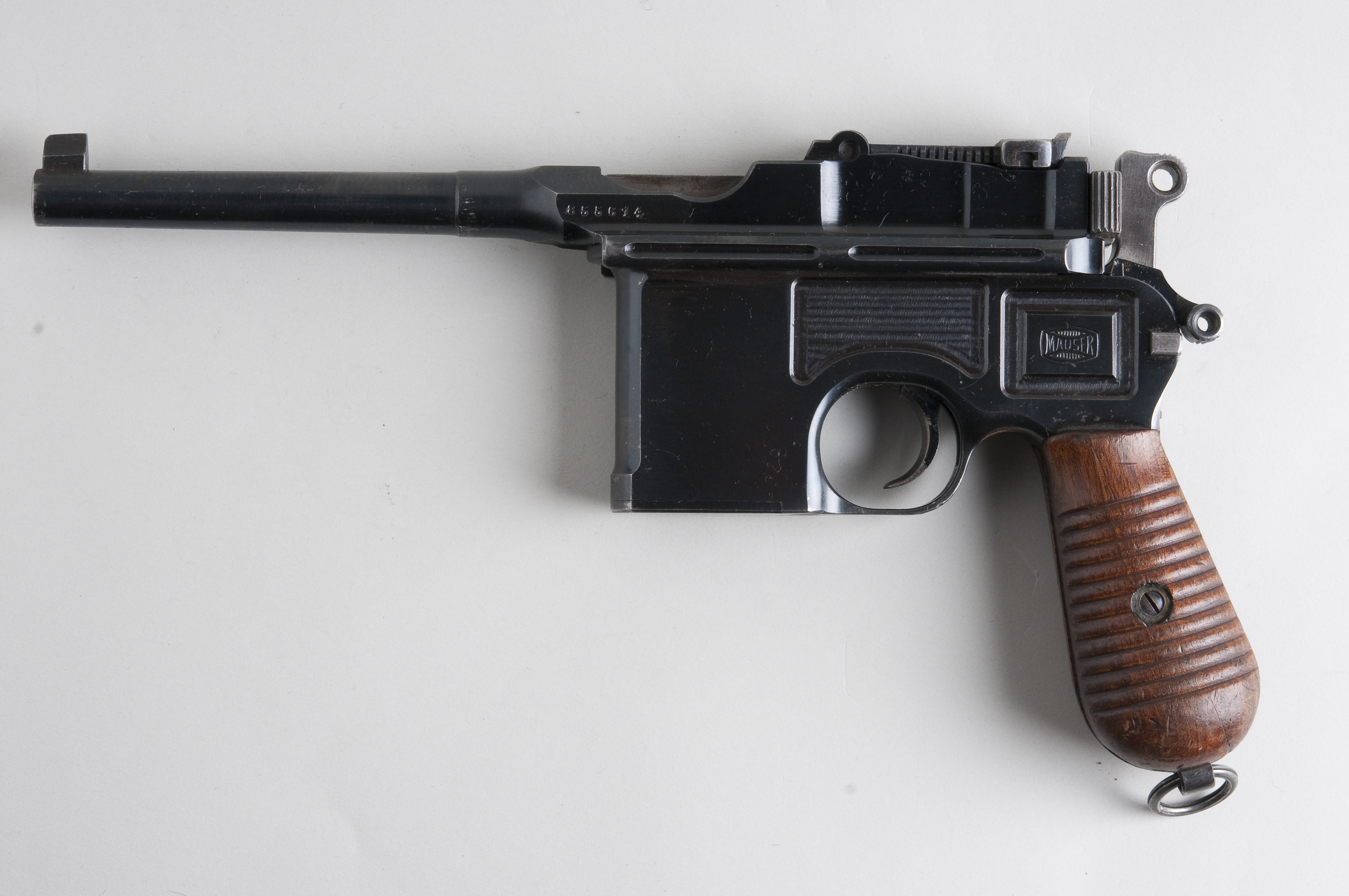
A Mauser C96, similar to the ones used by Yurovsky and Ermakov.

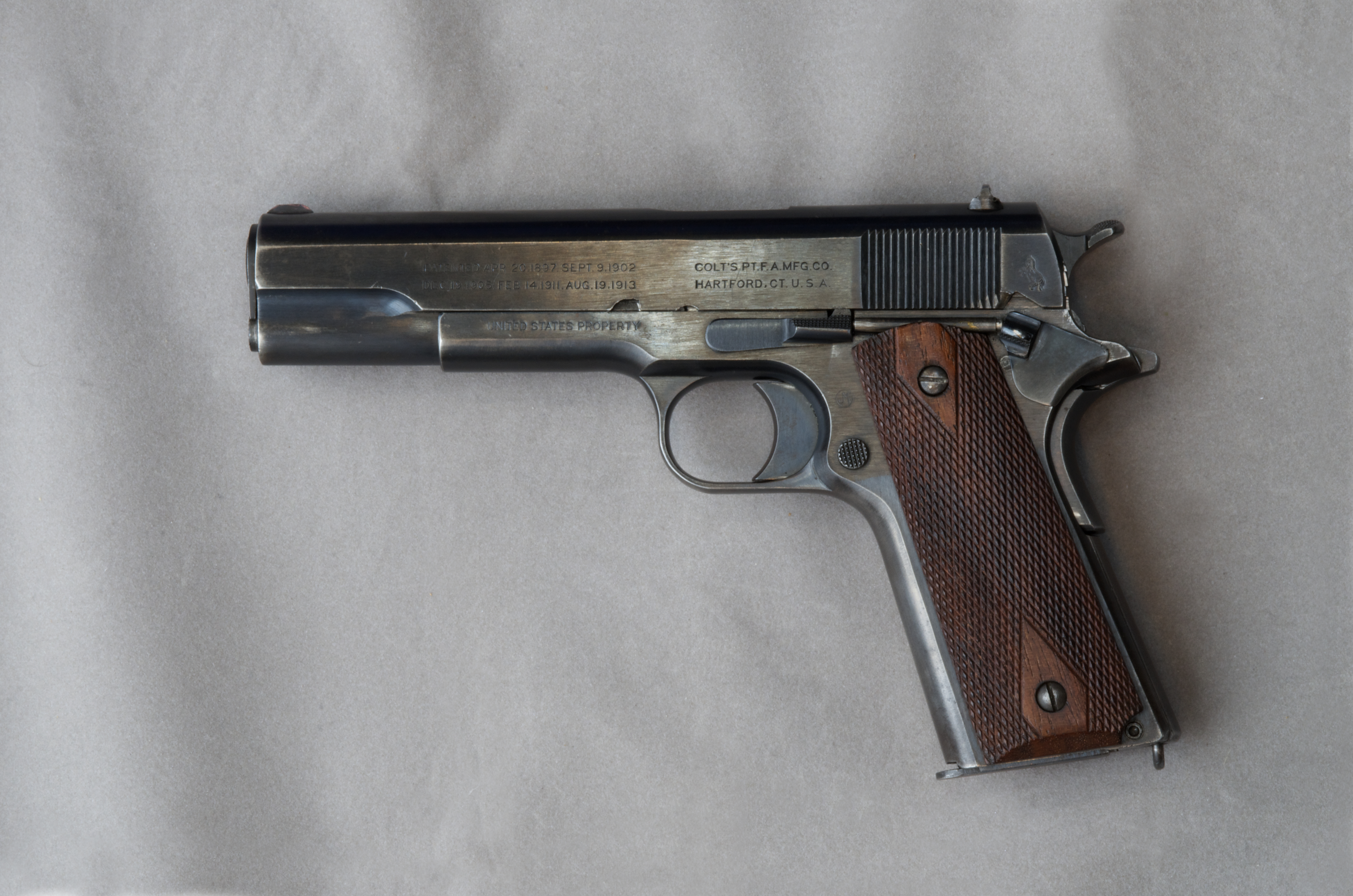
A Colt M1911, similar to the ones used by Yurovsky and Kudrin. Kudrin was also armed with a FN Browning M1900.

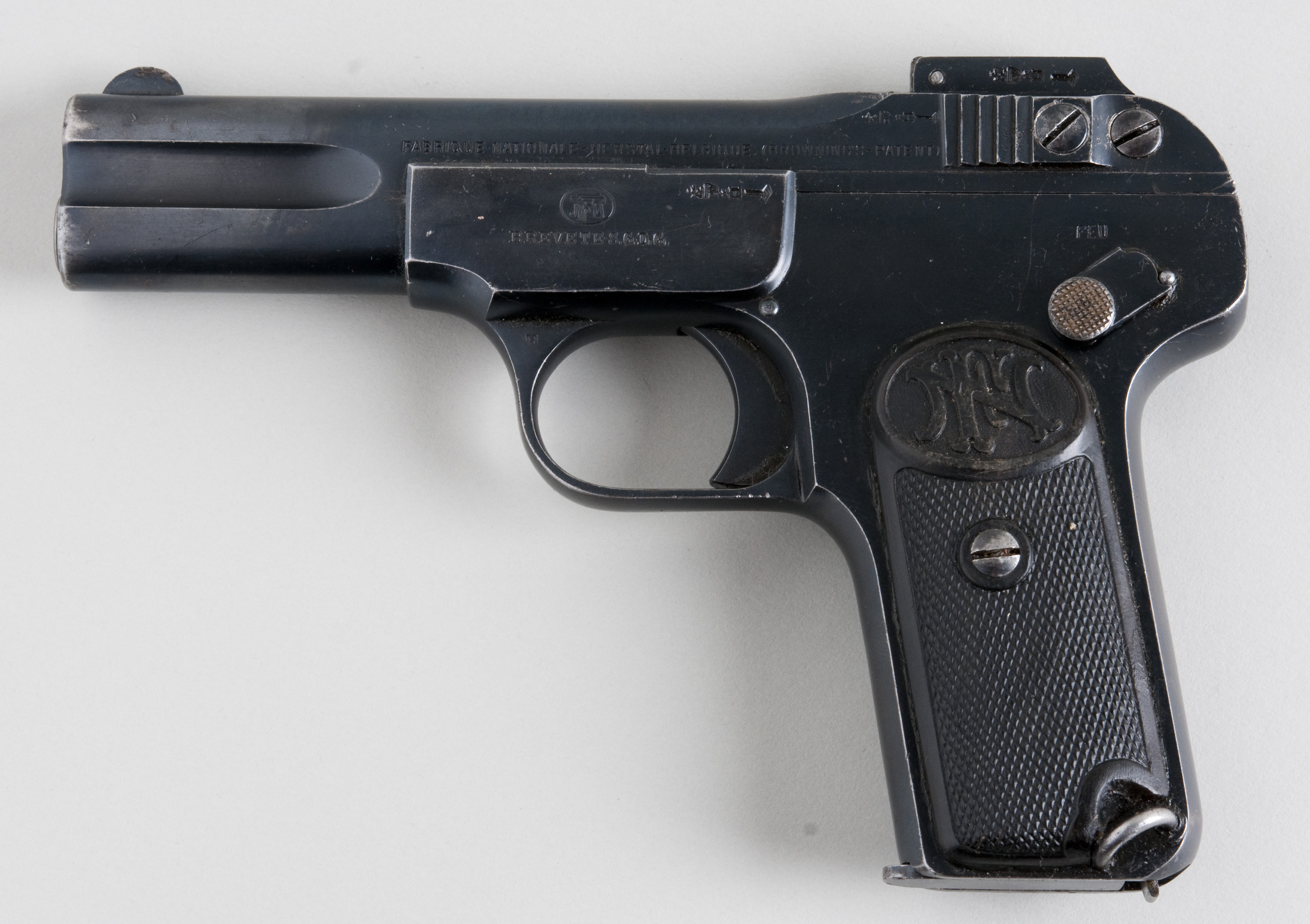
An FN Browning M1900.

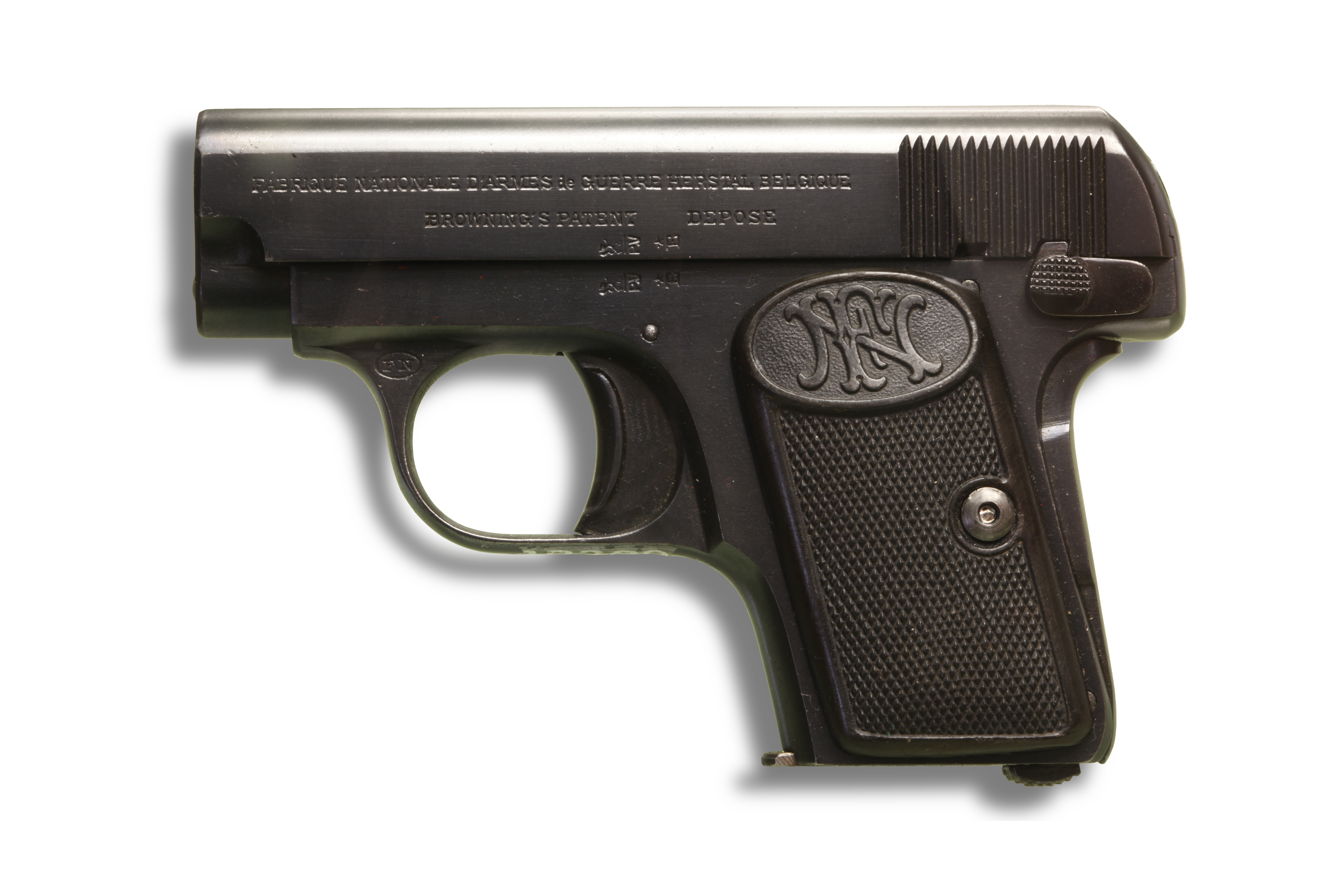
An FN Model M1906, similar to the one used by Grigory Nikulin.

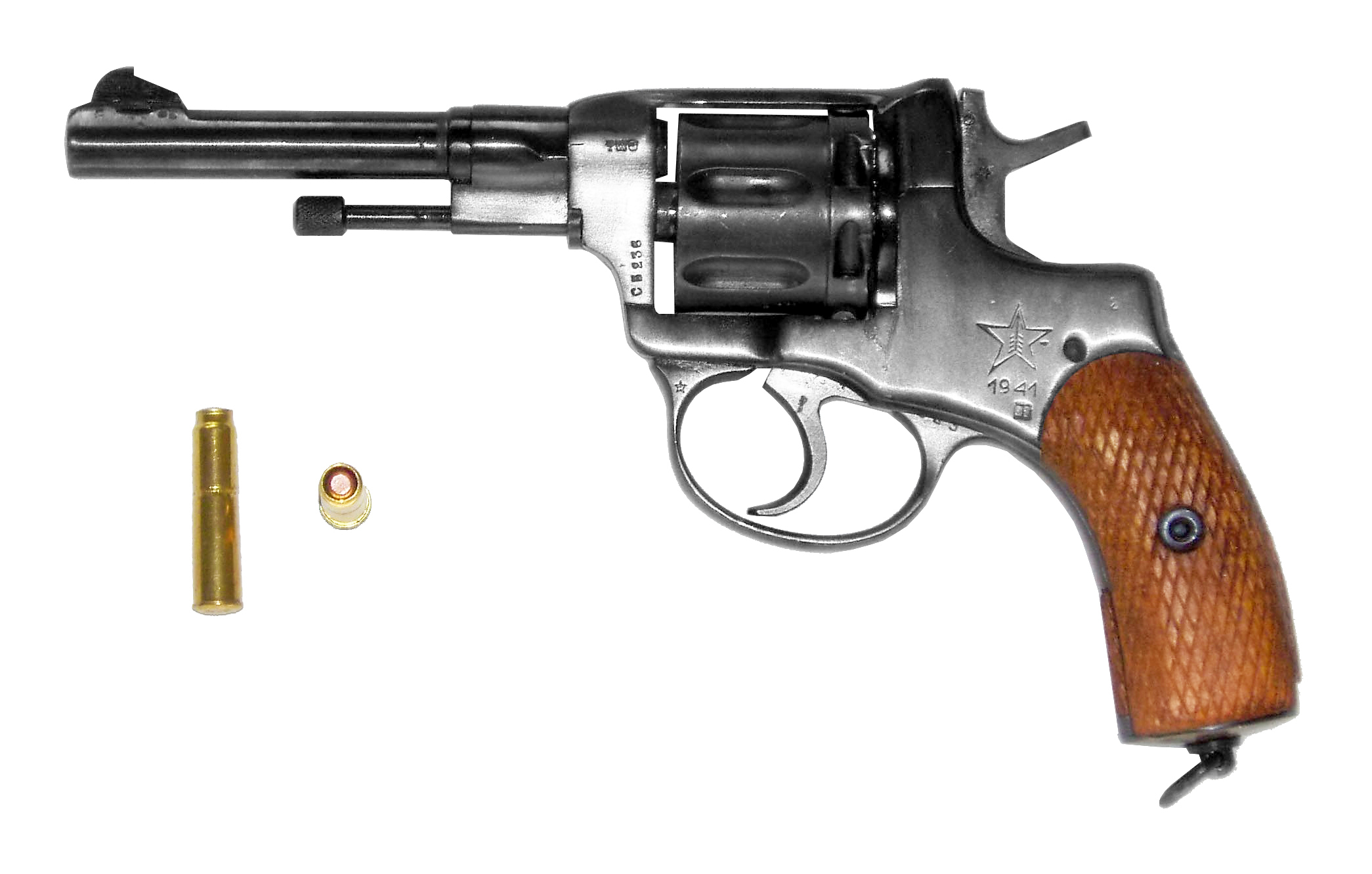
Nagant Revolver

The Ural Regional Soviet agreed in a meeting on 29 June that the entire Romanov family should be executed. Filipp Goloshchyokin arrived in Moscow as a representative of the Soviet on 3 July with a message insisting on the Tsar's execution. Only seven of the 23 members of the Central Executive Committee were in attendance, three of whom were Lenin, Sverdlov and Felix Dzerzhinsky. They agreed that the presidium of the Ural Regional Soviet under Beloborodov and Goloshchyokin should organize the practical details for the family's execution and decide the precise day on which it would take place when the military situation dictated it, contacting Moscow for final approval.

The killing of the Tsar's wife and children was also discussed, but it was kept a state secret to avoid any political repercussions; German ambassador Wilhelm von Mirbach made repeated enquiries to the Bolsheviks concerning the family's well-being. Another diplomat, British consul Thomas Preston, who lived near the Ipatiev House, was often pressured by Pierre Gilliard, Sydney Gibbes and Prince Vasily Dolgorukov to help the Romanovs; Dolgorukov smuggled notes from his prison cell before he was murdered by Grigory Nikulin, Yurovsky's assistant. Preston's requests to be granted access to the family were consistently rejected. Goloshchyokin reported back to Yekaterinburg on 12 July with a summary of his discussion about the Romanovs with Moscow, along with instructions that nothing relating to their deaths should be directly communicated to Lenin.

On 14 July, Yurovsky was finalizing the disposal site and how to destroy as much evidence as possible at the same time. He was frequently in consultation with Peter Ermakov, who was in charge of the disposal squad and claimed to know the outlying countryside. Yurovsky wanted to gather the family and servants in a small, confined space from which they could not escape. The basement room chosen for this purpose had a barred window which was nailed shut to muffle the sound of shooting and in case of any screaming. Shooting and stabbing them at night while they slept or killing them in the forest and then dumping them into the Iset pond with lumps of metal weighted to their bodies were ruled out. Yurovsky's plan was to perform an efficient execution of all 11 prisoners simultaneously, although he also took into account that he would have to prevent those involved from raping the women or searching the bodies for jewels. Having previously seized some jewelry, he suspected more was hidden in their clothes; the bodies were to be stripped naked in order to obtain the rest (this, along with the mutilations, was aimed at preventing investigators from identifying them).

On 16 July, Yurovsky was informed by the Ural Soviets that Red Army contingents were retreating in all directions and the executions could not be delayed any longer. A coded telegram seeking final approval was sent by Goloshchyokin and Georgy Safarov at around 6 pm to Lenin in Moscow. There is no documentary record of an answer from Moscow, although Yurovsky insisted that an order from the CEC to go ahead had been passed on to him by Goloshchyokin at around 7 pm. This claim was consistent with that of a former Kremlin guard, Aleksey Akimov, who in the late 1960s stated that Sverdlov instructed him to send a telegram confirming the CEC's approval of the 'trial' (code for execution) but required that both the written form and ticker tape be returned to him immediately after the message was sent. At 8 pm, Yurovsky sent his chauffeur to acquire a truck for transporting the bodies, along with rolls of canvas to wrap them in. The intention was to park it close to the basement entrance, with its engine running, to mask the noise of gunshots. Yurovsky and Pavel Medvedev collected 14 handguns to use that night: two Browning pistols (one M1900 and one M1906), two Colt M1911 pistols, two Mauser C96s, one Smith & Wesson, and seven Belgian-made Nagants. The Nagant operated on old black gunpowder which produced a good deal of smoke and fumes; smokeless powder was only just being phased in.

In the commandant's office, Yurovsky assigned victims to each killer before distributing the handguns. He took a Mauser and Colt while Ermakov armed himself with three Nagants, one Mauser and a bayonet; he was the only one assigned to kill two prisoners (Alexandra and Botkin). Yurovsky instructed his men to "shoot straight at the heart to avoid an excessive quantity of blood and get it over quickly." At least two of the Letts, an Austro-Hungarian prisoner of war named Andras Verhas and Adolf Lepa, himself in charge of the Lett contingent, refused to shoot the women. Yurovsky sent them to the Popov House for failing "at that important moment in their revolutionary duty". Neither Yurovsky nor any of the killers went into the logistics of how to efficiently destroy eleven bodies. He was under pressure to ensure that no remains would later be found by monarchists who would exploit them to rally anti-communist support.

== Murders ==
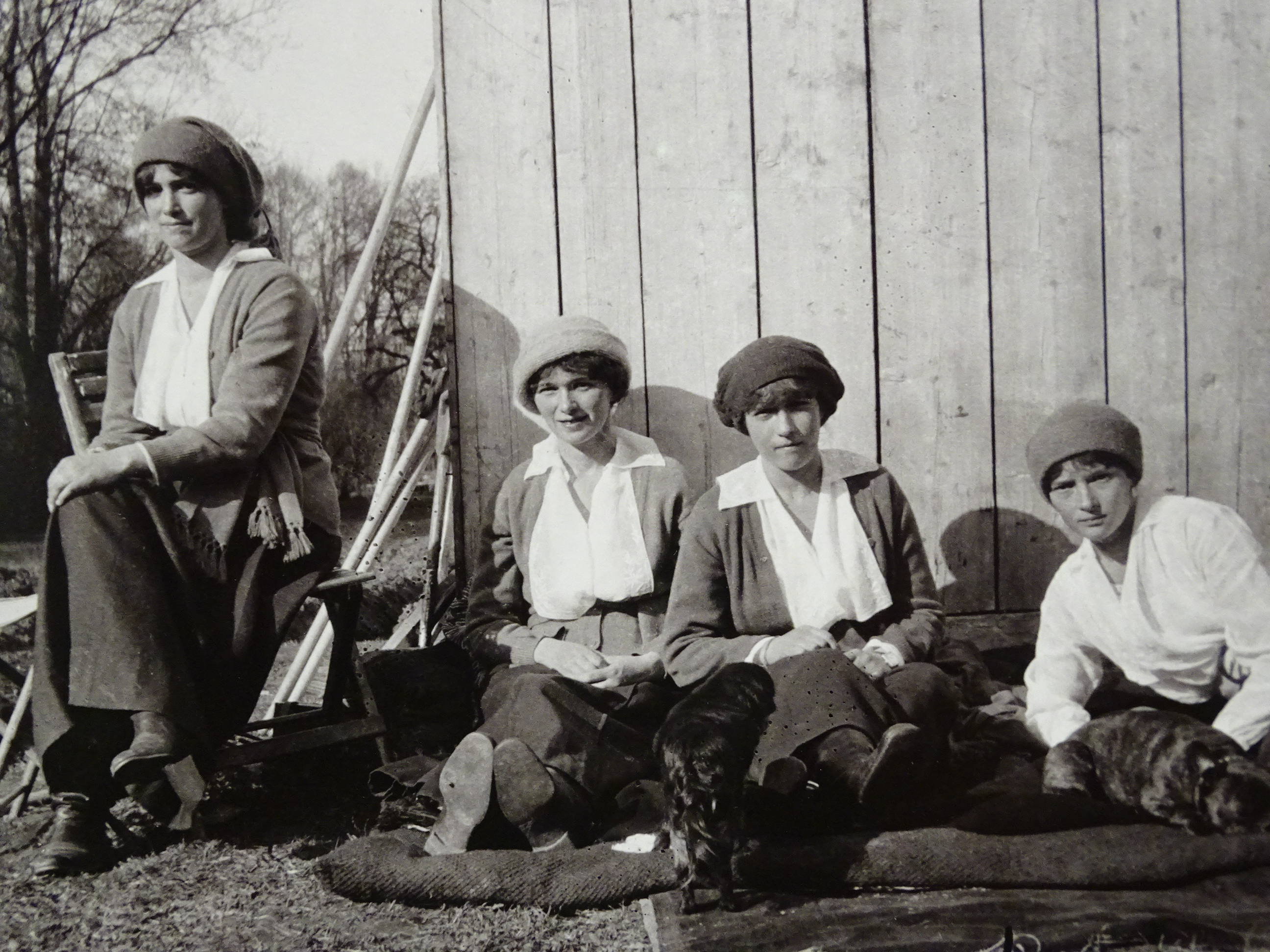
From left to right: Grand Duchesses Maria (age 17), Olga (age 20), Anastasia (age 15) and Tatiana Nikolaevna (age 19) of Russia in captivity at Tsarskoe Selo in the spring of 1917.

While the Romanovs were having dinner on 16 July 1918, Yurovsky entered the sitting room and informed them that Leonid Sednev, a chef's assistant, was leaving to meet his uncle, Ivan Sednev, who had returned to the city asking to see him; in fact, Ivan had already been shot by the Cheka. The family was very upset as Leonid was Alexei's only playmate and he was the fifth member of the imperial entourage to be taken from them, but they were assured by Yurovsky that he would be back soon. Leonid was kept in the Popov House that night. Yurovsky saw no reason to kill him and wanted him removed before the execution took place.

Around midnight on 17 July, Yurovsky ordered the Romanovs' physician, Eugene Botkin, to awaken the sleeping family and ask them to put on their clothes, under the pretext that the family would be moved to a safe location due to impending chaos in Yekaterinburg. The Romanovs were then ordered into a 6 m × 5 m (20 ft × 16 ft) semi-basement room. Alexandra requested a chair because she was sick, and Nicholas requested a second for Alexei. Yurovsky's assistant Grigory Nikulin remarked to him that the "heir wanted to die in a chair. Very well then, let him have one." The prisoners were told to wait in the cellar room while the truck that would transport them was being brought to the House. A few minutes later, an execution squad of secret police was brought in and Yurovsky read aloud the order given to him by the Ural Executive Committee:

Nikolai Alexandrovich, in view of the fact that your relatives are continuing their attack on Soviet Russia, the Ural Executive Committee has decided to execute you.

Nicholas, facing his family, turned and said "What? What?" Yurovsky quickly repeated the order and the weapons were raised. The Empress and Grand Duchess Olga, according to a guard's reminiscence, had tried to bless themselves, but failed amid the shooting. Yurovsky reportedly raised his Colt gun at Nicholas's torso and fired; Nicholas fell dead, pierced with at least three bullets in his upper chest. The intoxicated Peter Ermakov, the military commissar for Verkh-Isetsk, shot and killed Alexandra with a bullet wound to the head. He then shot at Tatiana, who ran for the double doors, hitting her in the thigh. The remaining executioners shot chaotically and over each other's shoulders until the room was so filled with smoke and dust that no one could see anything at all in the darkness nor hear any commands amid the noise.

Alexey Kabanov, who ran onto the street to check the noise levels, heard dogs barking from the Romanovs' quarters and the sound of gunshots loud and clear despite the noise from the Fiat's engine. Kabanov then hurried downstairs and told the men to stop firing and kill the family and their dogs with their gun butts and bayonets. Within minutes, Yurovsky was forced to stop the shooting because of the caustic smoke of burned gunpowder, dust from the plaster ceiling caused by the reverberation of bullets, and the deafening gunshots. When they stopped, the doors were then opened to scatter the smoke. While waiting for the smoke to abate, the killers could hear moans and whimpers inside the room. As it cleared, it became evident that although several of the family's retainers had been killed, all of the Imperial children were alive and only Tatiana was injured.

The noise of the guns had been heard by households all around, awakening many people. The executioners were ordered to use their bayonets, a technique which proved ineffective and meant that the children had to be dispatched by still more gunshots, this time aimed more precisely at their heads. The Tsarevich was the first of the children to be executed. Yurovsky watched in disbelief as Nikulin spent an entire magazine from his Browning gun on Alexei, who was still seated transfixed in his chair; he also had jewels sewn into his undergarment and forage cap. Ermakov shot and stabbed him, and when that failed, Yurovsky shoved him aside and killed the boy with a gunshot to the head. The last to die were Tatiana, Anastasia, and Maria (however, according to Yurovsky's note, Alexei, Olga, Tatiana, and Anastasia were the last to die), who were carrying over 1.3 kilograms (2.9 lb) of diamonds sewn into their clothing, which had given them a degree of protection from the firing. However, they were speared with bayonets as well. Olga sustained a gunshot wound to the head. Maria and Anastasia were said to have crouched up against a wall covering their heads with pillows in terror until they were shot in the head. Yurovsky killed Tatiana and Alexei. Tatiana died from a single shot to the back of her head. Alexei received two bullets to the head, right behind the ear. Anna Demidova, Alexandra's maid, survived the initial onslaught but was quickly stabbed to death against the back wall while trying to defend herself with a small pillow which she had carried that was filled with precious gems and jewels. While the bodies were being placed on stretchers, Anastasia cried out and covered her face with her arm. Ermakov grabbed Alexander Strekotin's rifle and bayoneted her in the chest, but when it failed to penetrate, he pulled out his revolver and shot her in the head.

While Yurovsky was checking the victims for pulses, Ermakov walked through the room, flailing the bodies with his bayonet. The execution lasted about 20 minutes, Yurovsky later admitting to Nikulin's "poor mastery of his weapon and inevitable nerves". Future investigations calculated that a possible 70 bullets were fired, roughly seven bullets per shooter, of which 57 were found in the basement and at all three subsequent gravesites. Some of Pavel Medvedev's stretcher bearers began frisking the bodies for valuables. Yurovsky saw this and demanded that they surrender any looted items or be shot. The attempted looting, coupled with Ermakov's incompetence and drunken state, convinced Yurovsky to oversee the disposal of the bodies himself. Only Alexei's spaniel, Joy, survived to be rescued by a British officer of the Allied Intervention Force, living out his final days in Windsor, Berkshire.

Alexandre Beloborodov sent a coded telegram to Lenin's secretary, Nikolai Gorbunov. It was found by White investigator Nikolai Sokolov and reads:

Inform Sverdlov the whole family have shared the same fate as the head. Officially the family will die at the evacuation.

Aleksandr Lisitsyn of the Cheka, an essential witness on behalf of Moscow, was designated to promptly dispatch to Sverdlov soon after the executions of Nicholas and Alexandra's politically valuable diaries and letters, which would be published in Russia as soon as possible. Beloborodov and Nikulin oversaw the ransacking of the Romanov quarters, seizing all the family's personal items, the most valuable piled up in Yurovsky's office whilst things considered inconsequential and of no value were stuffed into the stoves and burned. Everything was packed into the Romanovs' own trunks for dispatch to Moscow under escort by commissars. On 19 July, the Bolsheviks nationalized all confiscated Romanov properties, the same day Sverdlov announced the tsar's execution to the Council of People's Commissars.

== Disposal ==
The bodies of the Romanovs and their servants were loaded onto a Fiat truck equipped with a 60 hp engine, with a cargo area measuring 1.8 by 3.0 metres (6 ft × 10 ft). Heavily laden, the vehicle struggled for 14 kilometres (9 mi) on boggy road to reach the Koptyaki forest. Yurovsky was furious when he discovered that the drunken Ermakov had brought only one shovel for the burial. About 800 metres (1/2 mile) further on, near crossing no. 185 on the line serving the Verkh-Isetsk works, 25 men working for Ermakov were waiting with horses and light carts. These men were all intoxicated and they were outraged that the prisoners were not brought to them alive. They expected to be part of the lynch mob. Yurovsky maintained control of the situation with great difficulty, eventually getting Ermakov's men to shift some of the bodies from the truck onto the carts. A few of Ermakov's men pawed the female bodies for diamonds hidden in their undergarments, two of whom lifted up Alexandra's skirt and fingered her genitals. Yurovsky ordered them at gunpoint to back off, dismissing the two who had groped the tsarina's corpse and any others he had caught looting.

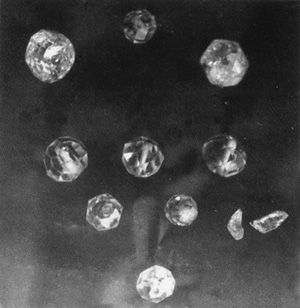
In the hasty disposal of the bodies, several belongings like these topazes were overlooked by Yurovsky's men and eventually recovered by Sokolov in 1919.

The truck was bogged down in an area of marshy ground near the Gorno-Uralsk railway line, during which all the bodies were unloaded onto carts and taken to the disposal site. The sun was up by the time the carts came within sight of the disused mine, which was a large clearing at a place called the Four Brothers (56.942222°N 60.473333°E). Yurovsky's men ate hardboiled eggs supplied by the local nuns (food that was meant for the imperial family), while the remainder of Ermakov's men were ordered back to the city as Yurovsky did not trust them and was displeased with their drunkenness.

Yurovsky and five other men laid out the bodies on the grass and undressed them, the clothes piled up and burned while Yurovsky took inventory of their jewellery. Only Maria's undergarments contained no jewels, which to Yurovsky was proof that the family had ceased to trust her ever since she became too friendly with one of the guards back in May. Once the bodies were "completely naked", they were dumped into a mineshaft and doused with sulphuric acid to disfigure them beyond recognition. Only then did Yurovsky discover that the pit was less than 3 metres (9.8 ft) deep and the muddy water below did not fully submerge the corpses as he had expected. He unsuccessfully tried to collapse the mine with hand grenades, after which his men covered it with loose earth and branches. Yurovsky left three men to guard the site while he returned to Yekaterinburg with a bag filled with 8.2 kilograms (18 lb) of looted diamonds, to report back to Beloborodov and Goloshchyokin. It was decided that the pit was too shallow.

The reason for the lack of jewels in Maria's underwear was, according to Gillard and other witnesses, "these bras were on exactly those daughters on which they were supposed to be. Maria could not have [had] such a bra, since they were made in Tobolsk when she was no longer there. It would be ridiculous to think that these bras were worn by someone else." Yurovsky knew nothing about the lack of jewelry in her underwear, writing in his 1922 memoir that "she is not similar to... the first two sisters: [she is] somewhat reticent and considered like a step-daughter in the family... [h]ere the special position Maria held in the family was confirmed".

Sergey Chutskaev of the local Soviet told Yurovsky of some deeper copper mines west of Yekaterinburg, the area remote and swampy and a grave there less likely to be discovered. He inspected the site on the evening of 17 July and reported back to the Cheka at the Amerikanskaya Hotel. He ordered additional trucks to be sent out to Koptyaki whilst assigning Pyotr Voykov to obtain barrels of petrol, kerosene and sulphuric acid, and plenty of dry firewood. Yurovsky also seized several horse-drawn carts to be used in the removal of the bodies to the new site. Yurovsky and Goloshchyokin, along with several Cheka agents, returned to the mineshaft at about 4 am on the morning of 18 July. The sodden corpses were hauled out one by one using ropes tied to their mangled limbs and laid under a tarpaulin. Yurovsky, worried that he might not have enough time to take the bodies to the deeper mine, ordered his men to dig another burial pit then and there, but the ground was too hard. He returned to the Amerikanskaya Hotel to confer with the Cheka. He seized a truck which he had loaded with blocks of concrete for attaching to the bodies before submerging them in the new mineshaft. A second truck carried a detachment of Cheka agents to help move the bodies. Yurovsky returned to the forest at 10 pm on 18 July. The bodies were again loaded onto the Fiat truck, which by then had been extricated from the mud.

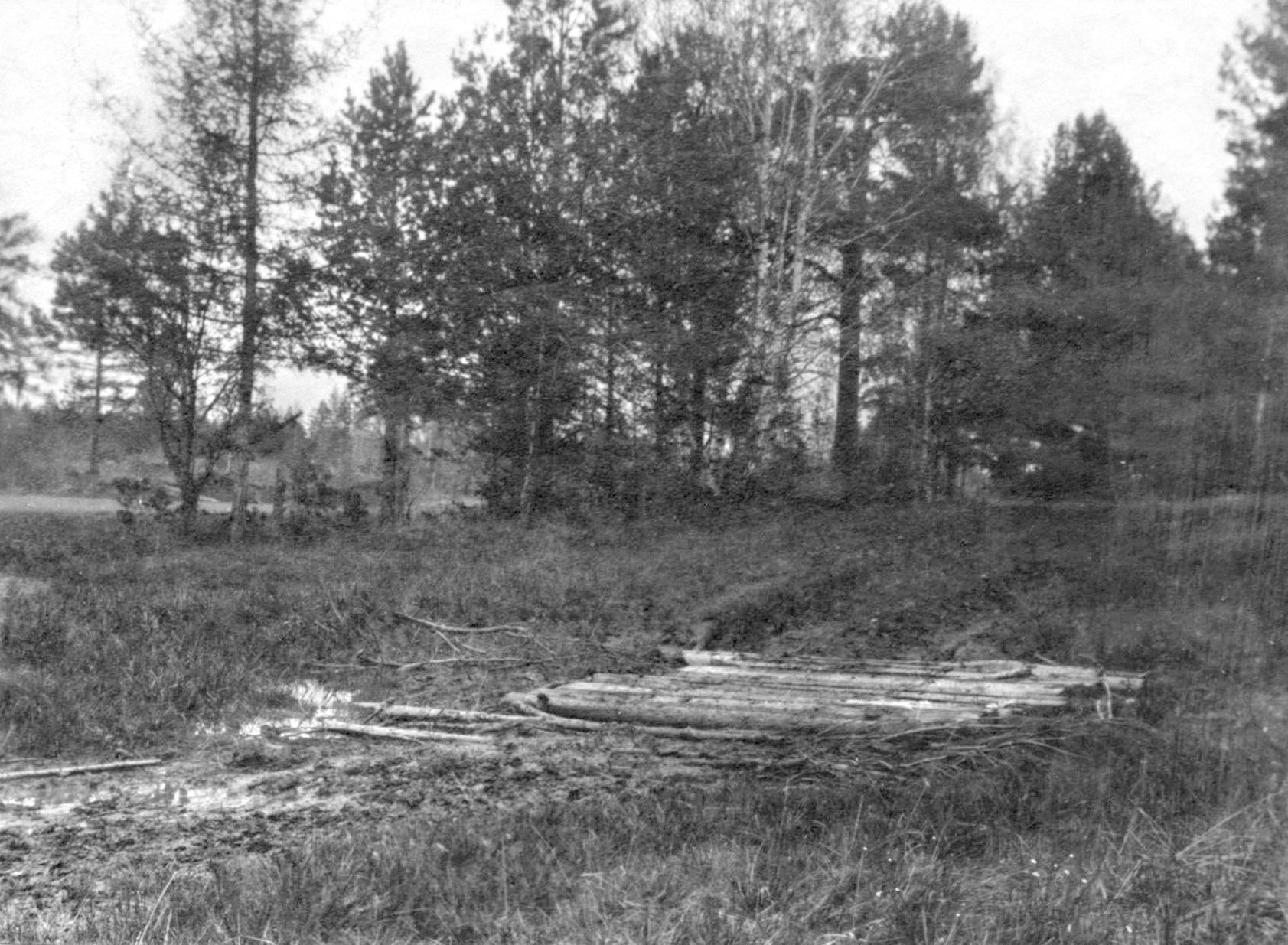
Railroad ties on the Koptyaki Road in 1919. Investigator Nikolai Sokolov took this photograph as evidence of where the Fiat truck had got stuck at 4:30am on 19 July, unaware that it was in fact the second burial site.

During transportation to the deeper copper mines on the early morning of 19 July, the Fiat truck carrying the bodies got stuck again in mud near Porosenkov Log ("Piglet's Ravine"). With the men exhausted, most refusing to obey orders and dawn approaching, Yurovsky decided to bury them under the road where the truck had stalled (56.9113628°N 60.4954326°E). They dug a grave that was 1.8 by 2.4 metres (6 ft × 8 ft) in size and barely 60 centimetres (2 ft) deep. Alexei Trupp's body was tossed in first, followed by the Tsar's and then the rest. Sulphuric acid was again used to dissolve the bodies, their faces smashed with rifle butts and covered with quicklime. Railroad ties were placed over the grave to disguise it, with the Fiat truck being driven back and forth over the ties to press them into the earth. The burial was completed at 6 am on 19 July.

Yurovsky separated the Tsarevich Alexei and one of his sisters to be buried about 15 metres (50 ft) away, in an attempt to confuse anyone who might discover the mass grave with only nine bodies. Since the female body was badly disfigured, Yurovsky mistook her for Anna Demidova; in his report he wrote that he had actually wanted to destroy Alexandra's corpse. Alexei and his sister were burned in a bonfire and their remaining charred bones were thoroughly smashed with spades and tossed into a smaller pit. 44 partial bone fragments from both corpses were found in August 2007.

=== Sokolov's investigation ===
After Yekaterinburg fell to the anti-communist White Army on 25 July, Admiral Alexander Kolchak established the Sokolov Commission to investigate the murders at the end of that month. Nikolai Sokolov, a legal investigator for the Omsk Regional Court, was appointed to undertake this. He interviewed several members of the Romanov entourage in February 1919, notably Pierre Gilliard, Alexandra Tegleva and Sydney Gibbes.

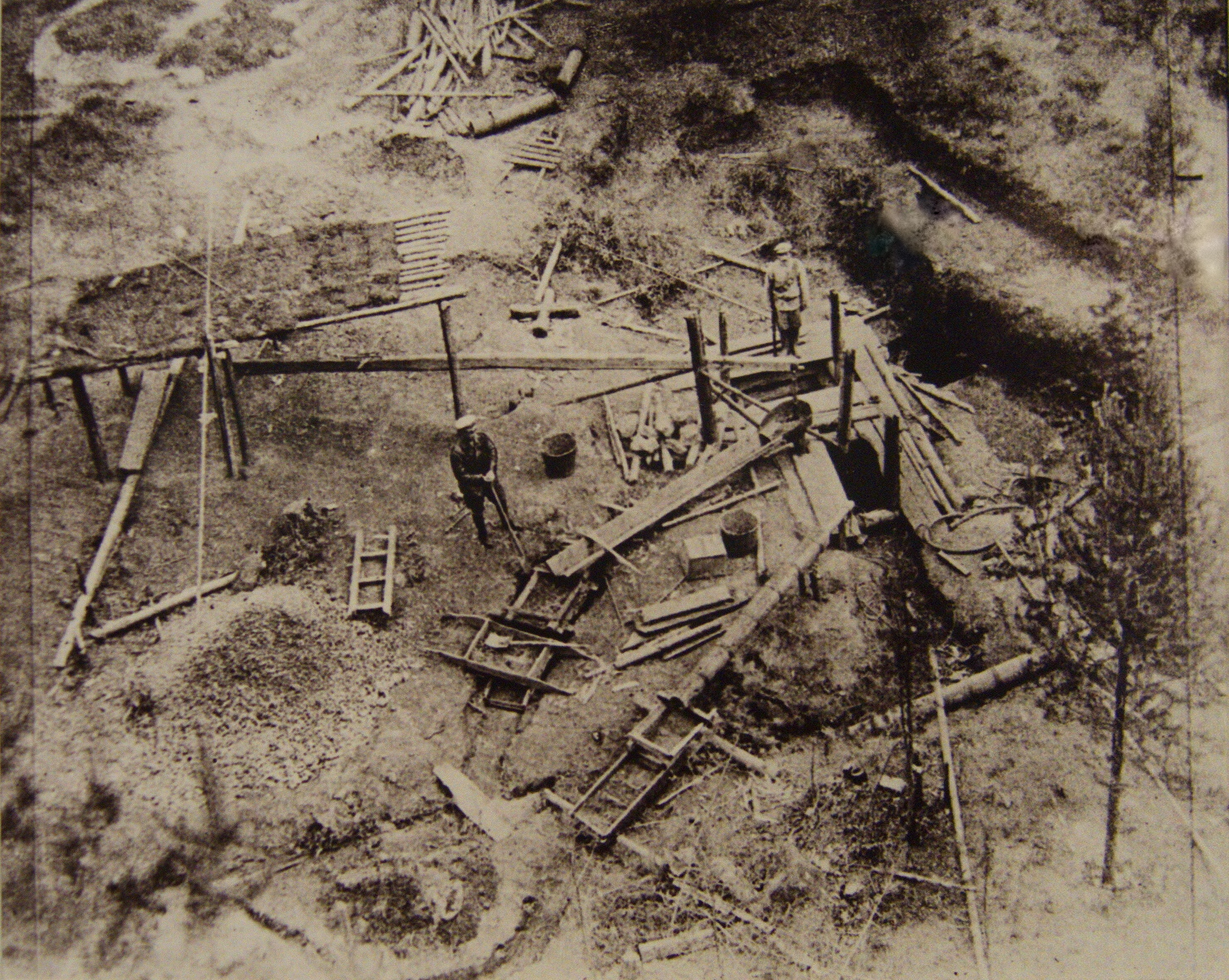
The Sokolov investigation inspecting the mineshaft in Spring 1919

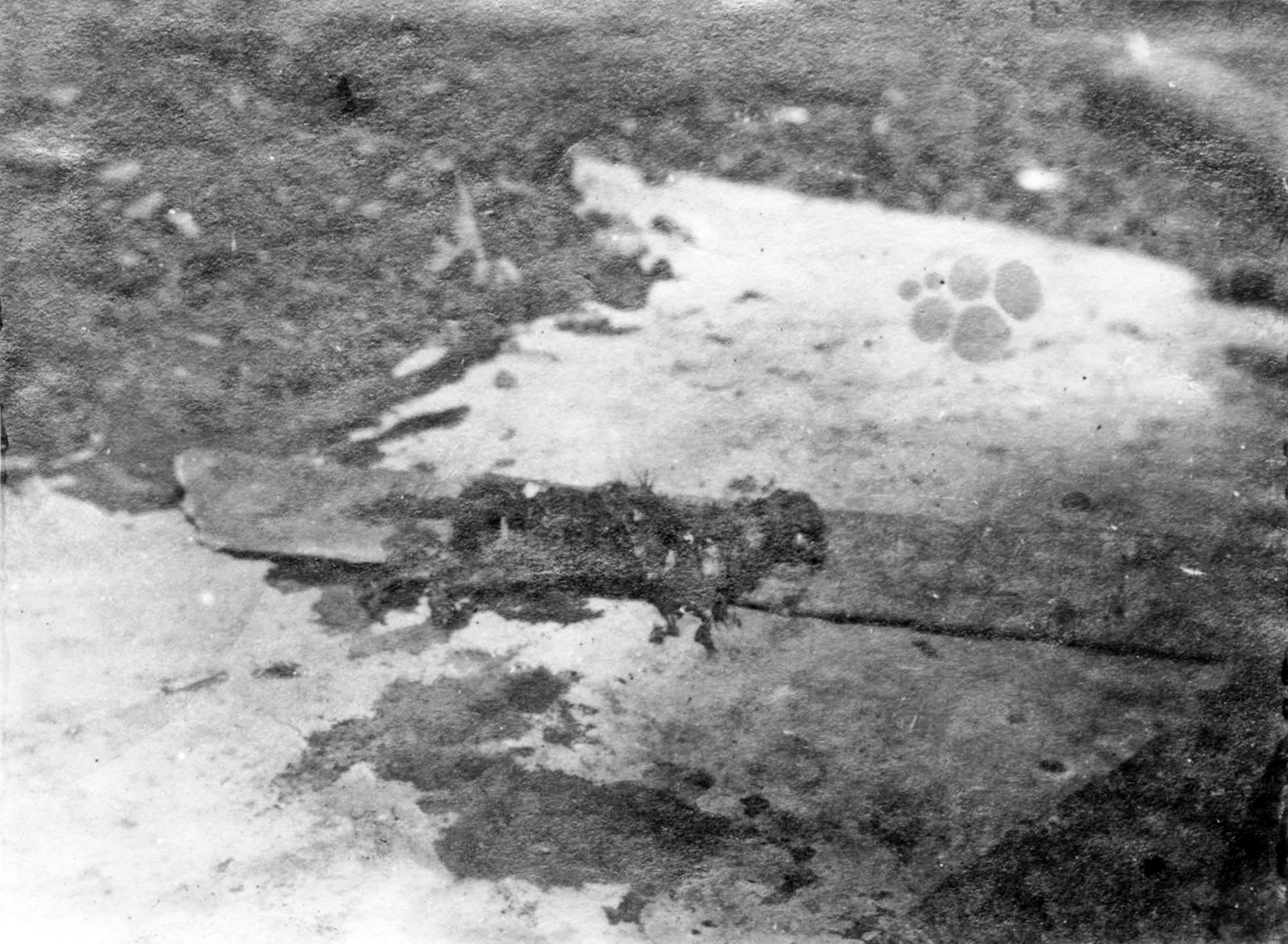
The remains of the dog "Jimmy" found by Sokolov

Sokolov discovered a large number of the Romanovs' belongings and valuables that were overlooked by Yurovsky and his men in and around the mineshaft where the bodies were initially disposed. Among them were burned bone fragments, congealed fat, Dr Botkin's upper dentures and glasses, corset stays, insignias and belt buckles, shoes, keys, pearls and diamonds, a few spent bullets, and part of a severed female finger. The corpse of Anastasia's King Charles Spaniel, Jimmy, was also found in the pit. The pit revealed no traces of clothing, which was consistent with Yurovsky's account that all the victims' clothes were burned.

Sokolov ultimately failed to find the concealed burial site on the Koptyaki Road; he photographed the spot as evidence of where the Fiat truck had become stuck on the morning of 19 July. The impending return of Bolshevik forces in July 1919 forced him to evacuate, and he brought the box containing the relics he recovered. Sokolov accumulated eight volumes of photographic and eyewitness accounts. He died in France in 1924 of a heart attack before he could complete his investigation. The box is stored in the Russian Orthodox Church of Saint Job in Uccle, Brussels.

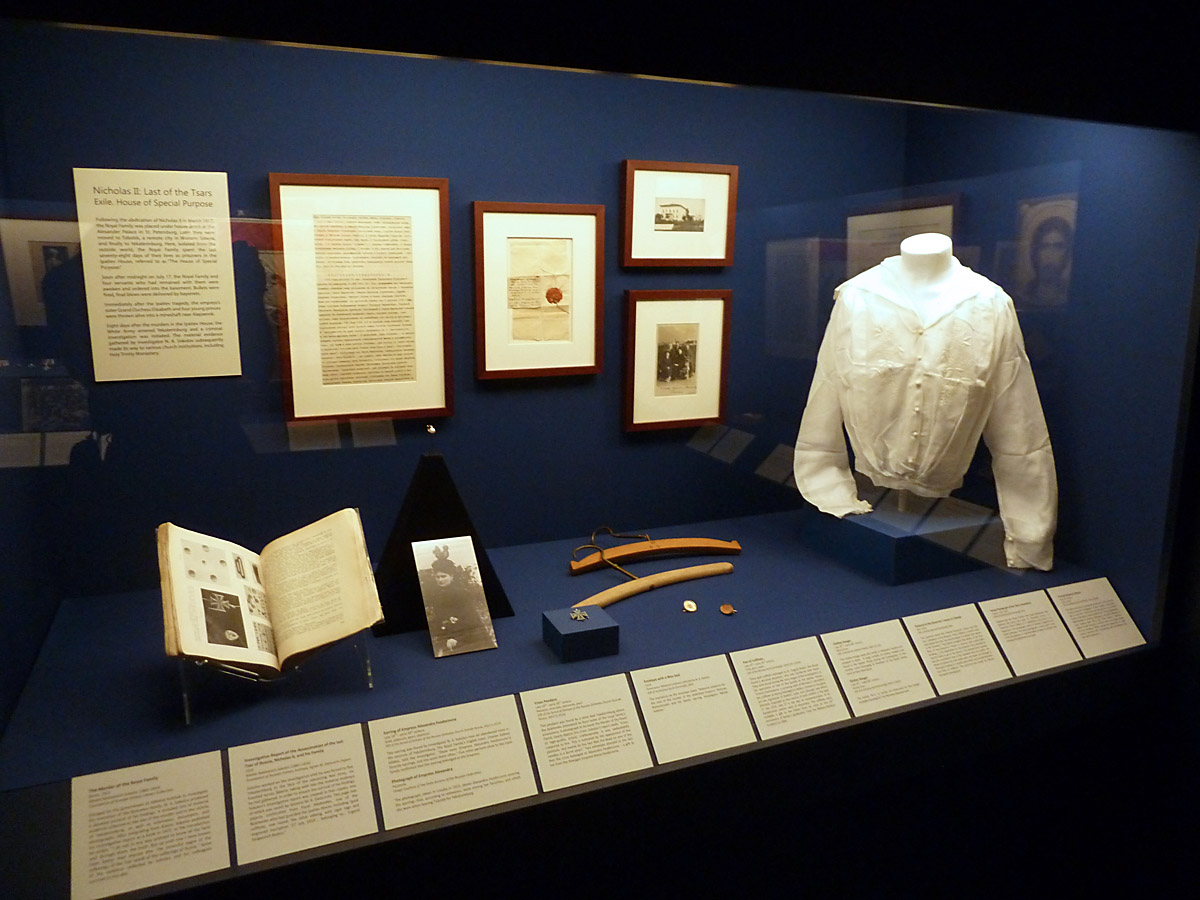
Recovered Romanov belongings on display at the Holy Trinity Seminary in Jordanville, New York. On the right is a blouse that belonged to one of the grand duchesses.

His preliminary report was published in a book that same year in French and then Russian. It was published in English in 1925. Until 1989, it was the only accepted historical account of the murders. He wrongly concluded that the prisoners died instantly from the shooting, with the exception of Alexei and Anastasia, who were shot and bayoneted to death, and that the bodies were destroyed in a massive bonfire. Publication and worldwide acceptance of the investigation prompted the Soviets to issue a government-approved textbook in 1926 that largely plagiarized Sokolov's work, admitting that the empress and her children had been murdered with the Tsar.

The Soviet government continued to attempt to control accounts of the murders. Sokolov's report was banned. Leonid Brezhnev's Politburo deemed the Ipatiev House lacking "sufficient historical significance" and it was demolished in September 1977 by KGB chairman Yuri Andropov, less than a year before the sixtieth anniversary of the murders. Yeltsin wrote in his memoirs that "sooner or later we will be ashamed of this piece of barbarism". The destruction of the house did not stop pilgrims or monarchists from visiting the site.

Local amateur sleuth Alexander Avdonin and filmmaker Geli Ryabov located the shallow grave on 30–31 May 1979 after years of covert investigation and a study of the primary evidence. Three skulls were removed from the grave, but after failing to find any scientist and laboratory to help examine them, and worried about the consequences of finding the grave, Avdonin and Ryabov reburied them in the summer of 1980. The presidency of Mikhail Gorbachev brought with it the era of glasnost (openness) and perestroika (reform), which prompted Ryabov to reveal the Romanovs' gravesite to The Moscow News on 10 April 1989, much to Avdonin's dismay. The remains were disinterred in 1991 by Soviet officials in a hasty 'official exhumation' that wrecked the site, destroying precious evidence. Since there were no clothes on the bodies and the damage inflicted was extensive, controversy persisted as to whether the skeletal remains identified and interred in St. Petersburg as Anastasia's were really hers or Maria's.

On 29 July 2007, another amateur group of local enthusiasts found the small pit containing the remains of Alexei and his sister, located in two small bonfire sites not far from the main grave on the Koptyaki Road. Although criminal investigators and geneticists identified them as Alexei and one of his sisters, either Maria or Anastasia, they remain stored in the state archives pending a decision from the church, which demanded a more "thorough and detailed" examination.

== Murderers ==
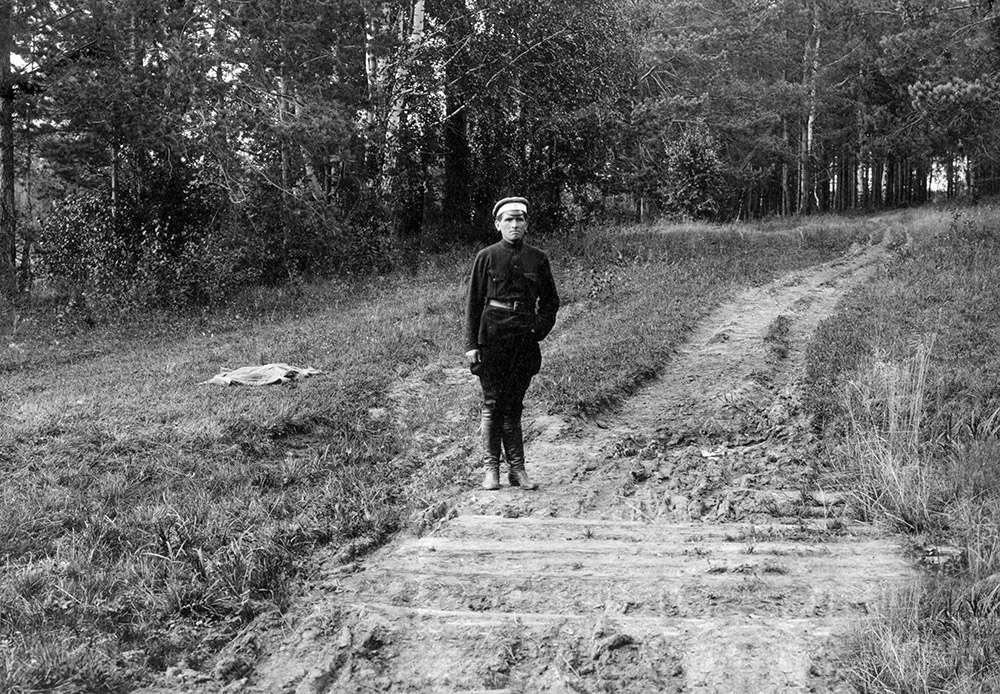
1920 photograph inscribed: "I am standing on the grave of the Tsar." Peter Ermakov survived the civil war unscathed; however, unlike the other killers, he received no awards or advancements, for which he grew bitter. For the rest of his life, he fought relentlessly for primacy by inflating his role in the murders as well as the revolution. Local Communist Party members annually pay tribute to his gravestone on the anniversary of the murders, though on a few occasions it has also been vandalized.

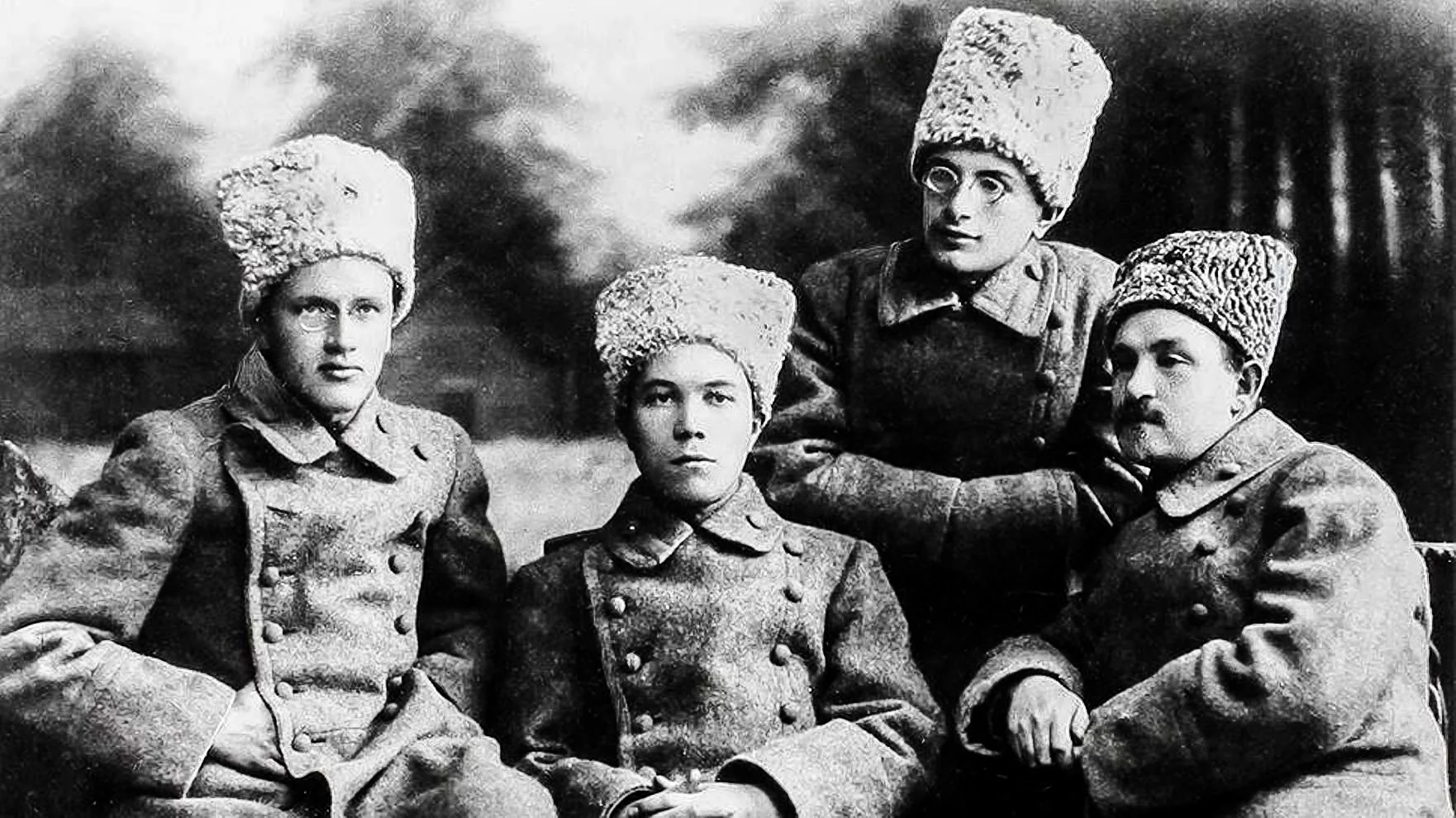
Members of the Ural Regional Soviet in 1918 – the Bolsheviks who issued the order to execute Tsar Nicholas II Romanov and his family. From left to right: N. G. Tolmachyov, A. G. Beloborodov, G. I. Safarov, F. I. Goloshchyokin.

Ivan Plotnikov, history professor at the Maksim Gorky Ural State University, has established that the executioners were Yakov Yurovsky, Grigory P. Nikulin, Mikhail A. Medvedev (Kuprin), Peter Ermakov, Stepan Vaganov, Alexey G. Kabanov (former soldier in the Tsar's Life Guards and Chekist assigned to the attic machine gun), Pavel Medvedev, V. N. Netrebin, and Y. M. Tselms. Filipp Goloshchyokin, a close associate of Yakov Sverdlov, being a military commissar of the Uralispolkom in Yekaterinburg, however did not actually participate, and two or three guards refused to take part. Pyotr Voykov was given the specific task of arranging for the disposal of their remains, obtaining 570 litres (130 imp gal; 150 US gal) of gasoline and 180 kilograms (400 lb) of sulphuric acid, the latter from the Yekaterinburg pharmacy. He was a witness but later claimed to have taken part in the murders, looting belongings from a dead grand duchess. After the killings, he was to declare that "The world will never know what we did with them." Voykov served as Soviet ambassador to Poland in 1924, where he was assassinated by a Russian monarchist in July 1927.

The White Army investigator Nikolai Sokolov erroneously claimed that the execution of the Imperial Family was carried out by a group of "Latvians led by a Jew". However, in light of Plotnikov's research, the group that carried out the execution consisted almost entirely of ethnic Russians (Nikulin, Medvedev (Kudrin), Ermakov, Vaganov, Kabanov, Medvedev and Netrebin) with the participation of one Jew (Yurovsky) and possibly one Latvian (Ya.M. Tselms), with facilitation by another Jew (Goloshchyokin). The men who were directly complicit in the murder of the imperial family largely survived in the immediate months after the murders. Stepan Vaganov, Ermakov's close associate, was attacked and killed by peasants in late 1918 for his participation in local acts of brutal repression by the Cheka. Pavel Medvedev, head of the Ipatiev House guard and one of the key figures in the murders, was captured by the White Army in Perm in February 1919. During his interrogation he denied taking part in the murders and died in prison of typhus. Alexander Beloborodov and his deputy, Boris Didkovsky, were both killed in 1938 during the Great Purge. Filipp Goloshchyokin was shot in October 1941 in an NKVD prison and consigned to an unmarked grave.

Three days after the murders, Yurovsky personally reported to Lenin on the events of that night and was rewarded with an appointment to the Moscow City Cheka. He held a succession of key economic and party posts, dying in the Kremlin Hospital in 1938 aged 60. Prior to his death, he donated the guns he used in the murders to the Museum of the Revolution in Moscow, and left behind three important, though contradictory, accounts of the event.

A British war correspondent, Francis McCullagh, who met Yurovsky in 1920 alleged that he was remorseful over his role in the execution of the Romanovs. However, in a final letter that was written to his children shortly before his death in 1938, he only reminisced about his revolutionary career and how "the storm of October" had "turned its brightest side" towards him, making him "the happiest of mortals"; there was no expression of regret or remorse over the murders. Yurovsky and his assistant, Nikulin, who died in 1964, are buried in the Novodevichy Cemetery in Moscow. His son, Alexander Yurovsky, voluntarily handed over his father's memoirs to amateur investigators Avdonin and Ryabov in 1978.

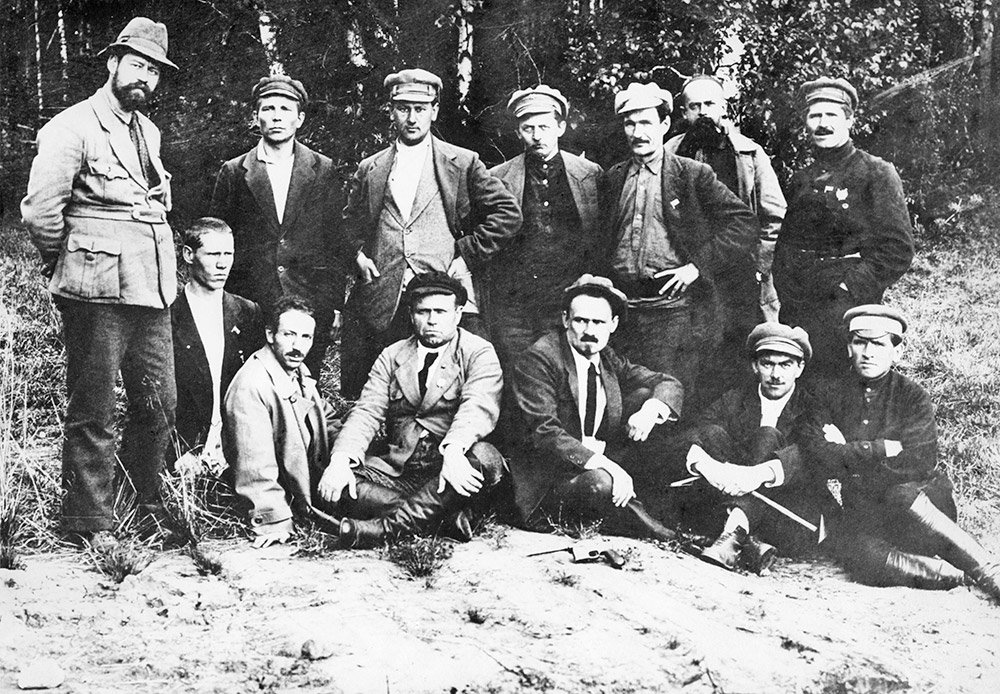
1924 Photograph of Ural Bolsheviks from left to right: Top 1st row – A. I. Paramonov, N. N., M. M. Kharitonov, B.V. Didkovsky, I. P. Rumyantsev, N. N., A. L. Borchaninov; Bottom 2nd row – D. E. Sulimov, G.S. Frost, M.V. Vasilyev, V.M. Bykov, A.G. Kabanov, P. S. Ermakov. They stand and sit on a bridge of sleepers under which the royal family was buried, and next lies Ermakov's mauser, with which, in his own words, he "shot the Tsar".

Lenin saw the House of Romanov as "monarchist filth, a 300-year disgrace", and referred to Nicholas II in conversation and in his writings as "the most evil enemy of the Russian people, a bloody executioner, an Asiatic gendarme" and "a crowned robber." A written record outlining the chain of command and tying the ultimate responsibility for the fate of the Romanovs back to Lenin was either never made or carefully concealed. Lenin operated with extreme caution, his favored method being to issue instructions in coded telegrams, insisting that the original and even the telegraph ribbon on which it was sent be destroyed. Uncovered documents in Archive No. 2 (Lenin), Archive No. 86 (Sverdlov) as well as the archives of the Council of People's Commissars and the Central Executive Committee reveal that a host of party 'errand boys' were regularly designated to relay his instructions, either by confidential notes or anonymous directives made in the collective name of the Council of People's Commissars. In all such decisions Lenin regularly insisted that no written evidence be preserved. The 55 volumes of Lenin's Collected Works as well as the memoirs of those who directly took part in the murders were scrupulously censored, emphasizing the roles of Sverdlov and Goloshchyokin.

Lenin was, however, aware of Vasily Yakovlev's decision to take Nicholas, Alexandra and Maria further on to Omsk instead of Yekaterinburg in April 1918, having become worried about the extremely threatening behavior of the Ural Soviets in Tobolsk and along the Trans-Siberian Railway. The Biographical Chronicle of Lenin's political life confirms that first Lenin (between 6 and 7 pm) and then Lenin and Sverdlov together (between 9:30 and 11:50 pm) had direct telegraph contact with the Ural Soviets about Yakovlev's change of route. Despite Yakovlev's request to take the family further away to the more remote Simsky Gorny District in Ufa province (where they could hide in the mountains), warning that "the baggage" would be destroyed if given to the Ural Soviets, Lenin and Sverdlov were adamant that they be brought to Yekaterinburg. On 16 July, the editors of Danish newspaper Nationaltidende queried Lenin to "kindly wire facts" in regard to a rumor that Nicholas II "has been murdered"; he responded, "Rumor not true. Ex-tsar safe. All rumors are only lies of capitalist press." By this time, however, the coded telegram ordering the execution of Nicholas, his family and retinue had already been sent to Yekaterinburg.

Lenin also welcomed news of the death of Grand Duchess Elizabeth, who was murdered in Alapayevsk along with five other Romanovs on 18 July 1918, remarking that "virtue with the crown on it is a greater enemy to the world revolution than a hundred tyrant tsars". Soviet historiography portrayed Nicholas as a weak and incompetent leader whose decisions led to military defeats and the deaths of millions of his subjects, while Lenin's reputation was protected at all costs, thus ensuring that no discredit was brought on him; responsibility for the 'liquidation' of the Romanov family was directed at the Ural Soviets and Yekaterinburg Cheka.

== Aftermath ==
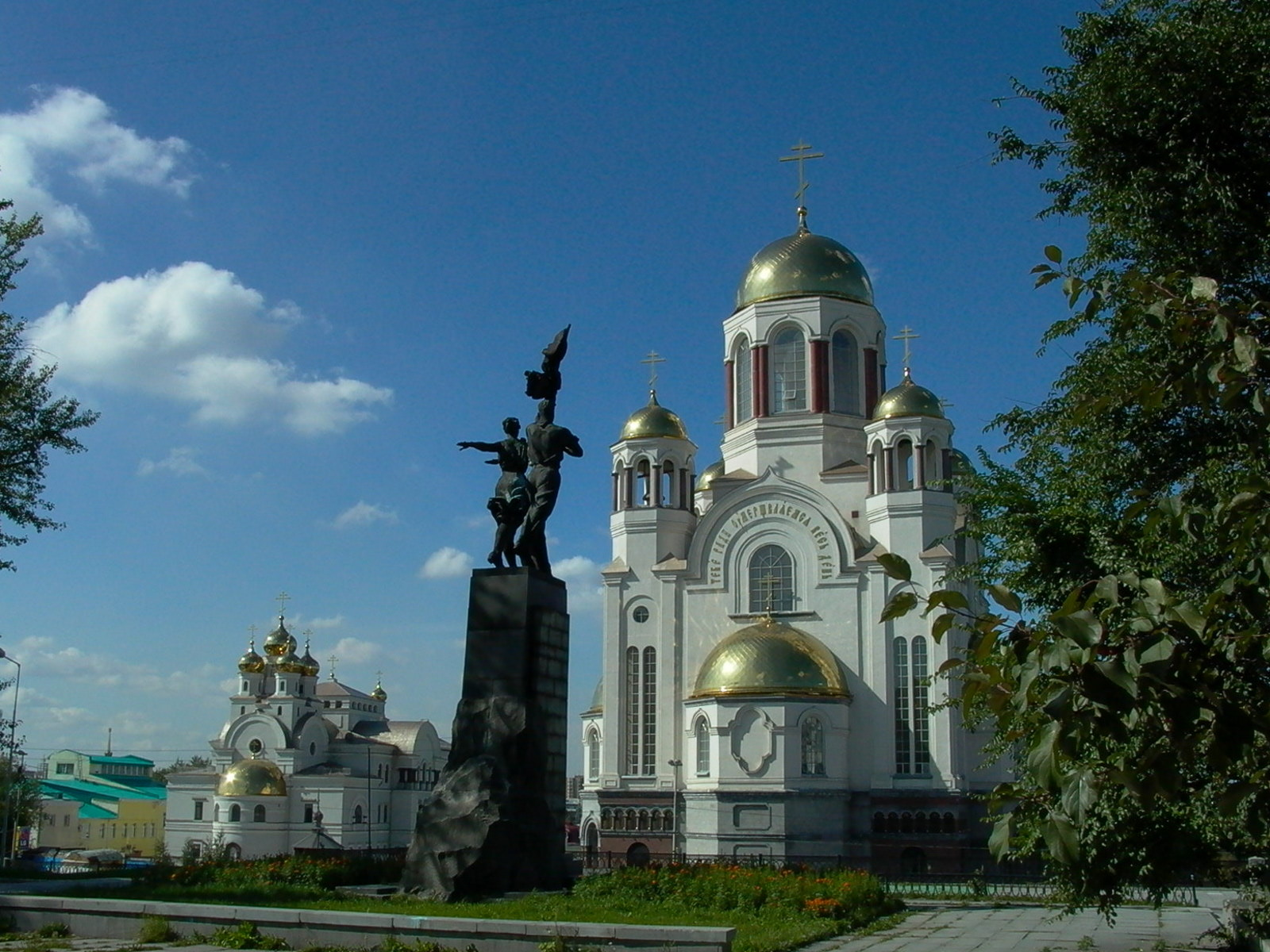
The Church of All Saints, built on the spot of the Ipatiev House

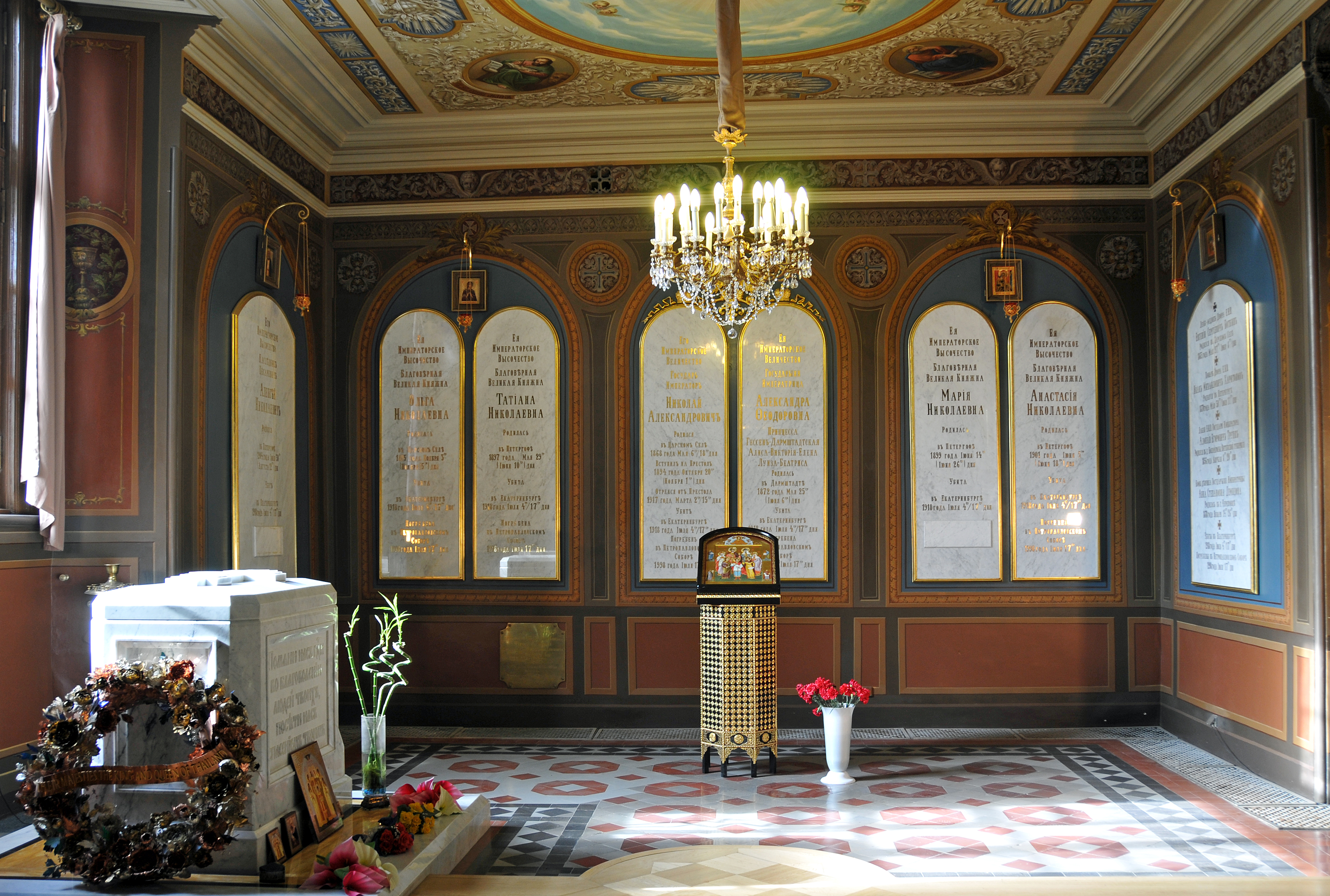
The final resting places of the Romanov family and their servants in St. Catherine's Chapel in the Peter and Paul Cathedral. The names of Maria (third from right) and Alexei (far left) on the wall do not have a burial date inscribed at the bottom.

On the afternoon of 19 July, Filipp Goloshchyokin announced at the Opera House on Glavny Prospekt that "Nicholas the bloody" had been shot and his family taken to another place. Sverdlov granted permission for the local paper in Yekaterinburg to publish the "Execution of Nicholas, the Bloody Crowned Murderer – Shot without Bourgeois Formalities but in Accordance with our new democratic principles", along with the coda that "the wife and son of Nicholas Romanov have been sent to a safe place". An official announcement appeared in the national press, two days later. It reported that the monarch had been executed on the order of Uralispolkom under pressure posed by the approach of the Czechoslovaks.

Over the course of 84 days after the Yekaterinburg murders, 27 more friends and relatives (14 Romanovs and 13 members of the imperial entourage and household) were murdered by the Bolsheviks: at Alapayevsk on 18 July, Perm on 4 September, and the Peter and Paul Fortress on 24 January 1919. Unlike the imperial family, the bodies at Alapayevsk and Perm were recovered by the White Army in October 1918 and May 1919 respectively. However, only the final resting places of Grand Duchess Elizabeth Feodorovna and her faithful companion Sister Varvara Yakovleva are known today, buried alongside each other in the Church of Mary Magdalene in Jerusalem.

Although official Soviet accounts place the responsibility for the decision with the Uralispolkom, an entry in Leon Trotsky's diary implies that Lenin approved the decision, although this could merely have been an assumption by Sverdlov. Trotsky wrote:

My next visit to Moscow took place after the [temporary] fall of Yekaterinburg [to anti-Bolshevik forces]. Speaking with Sverdlov, I asked in passing: "Oh yes, and where is the Tsar?"

"Finished," he replied. "He has been shot."

"And where is the family?"

"The family along with him."

"All of them?," I asked, apparently with a trace of surprise.

"All of them," replied Sverdlov. "What about it?" He was waiting to see my reaction. I made no reply.

"And who made the decision?" I asked.

"We decided it here. Ilyich [Lenin] believed that we shouldn't leave the Whites a live banner to rally around, especially under the present difficult circumstances."

In his diary, Trotsky emphasised that he understood Lenin's reasoning, on the grounds that the militant workers and soldiers of Yekaterinburg would not have accepted any other course of action.

Nevertheless, as of 2011, no official document has been found of either Lenin or Sverdlov giving the order. Vladimir N. Solovyov, the leader of the Investigative Committee of Russia's 2007 investigation on the shooting of the Romanov family, declared:

According to the presumption of innocence, no one can be held criminally liable without guilt being proven. In the criminal case, an unprecedented search for archival sources taking all available materials into account was conducted by authoritative experts, such as Sergey Mironenko, the director of the largest archive in the country, the State Archive of the Russian Federation. The study involved the main experts on the subject – historians and archivists. And I can confidently say that today there is no reliable document that would prove the initiative of Lenin and Sverdlov.

In 1993, the report of Yakov Yurovsky from 1922 was published. According to the report, units of the Czechoslovak Legion were approaching Yekaterinburg. On 17 July 1918, Yakov and other Bolshevik jailers, fearing that the Legion would free Nicholas after conquering the town, murdered him and his family. The next day, Yakov departed for Moscow with a report to Sverdlov. As soon as the Czechoslovaks seized Yekaterinburg, his apartment was pillaged.

Over the years, a number of people claimed to be survivors of the ill-fated family. In May 1979, the remains of most of the family and their retainers were found by two amateur enthusiasts, Alexander Avdonin and Geli Ryabov, who kept the discovery secret until the collapse of the Soviet Union. In July 1991, the bodies of five family members (the Tsar, Tsarina, and three of their daughters) were exhumed. After forensic examination and DNA identification (partly aided by mitochondrial DNA samples from Prince Philip, a great-nephew of Alexandra), the bodies were laid to rest with state honors in the St. Catherine Chapel of the Peter and Paul Cathedral in Saint Petersburg, where most other Russian monarchs since Peter the Great lie. Boris Yeltsin and his wife attended the funeral along with Romanov relations, including Prince Michael of Kent. The Holy Synod opposed the government's decision in February 1998 to bury the remains in the Peter and Paul Fortress, preferring a "symbolic" grave until their authenticity had been resolved. As a result, when they were interred in July 1998, they were referred to by the priest conducting the service as "Christian victims of the Revolution" rather than the imperial family. Patriarch Alexy II, who felt that the Church was sidelined in the investigation, refused to officiate at the burial and banned bishops from taking part in the funeral ceremony. The Russian president Boris Yeltsin described the murder of the royal family as one of the most shameful chapters in Russian history.

The remaining two bodies of Alexei and one of his sisters, presumed to be Maria by Russian anthropologists and Anastasia by American ones, were discovered in 2007.

On 15 August 2000, the Russian Orthodox Church announced the canonization of the family for their "humbleness, patience and meekness". However, reflecting the intense debate preceding the issue, the bishops did not proclaim the Romanovs as martyrs, but passion bearers instead (see Romanov sainthood).

Over the years 2000 to 2003, the Church of All Saints, Yekaterinburg was built on the site of Ipatiev House.

On 1 October 2008, the Supreme Court of the Russian Federation ruled that Nicholas II and his family were victims of political repression and rehabilitated them. The rehabilitation was denounced by the Communist Party of the Russian Federation, vowing the decision will "sooner or later be corrected".

On 26 August 2010, a Russian court ordered prosecutors to reopen an investigation into the murder of Tsar Nicholas II and his family, although the Bolsheviks believed to have shot them in 1918 had died long before. The Russian Prosecutor General's main investigative unit said it had formally closed a criminal investigation into the killing of Nicholas because too much time had elapsed since the crime and because those responsible had died. However, Moscow's Basmanny Court ordered the re-opening of the case, saying that a Supreme Court ruling blaming the state for the killings made the deaths of the actual gunmen irrelevant, according to a lawyer for the Tsar's relatives and local news agencies.

In late 2015, at the insistence by the Russian Orthodox Church, Russian investigators exhumed the bodies of Nicholas II and his wife, Alexandra, for additional DNA testing, which confirmed that the bones were of the couple.

A survey conducted by the Russian Public Opinion Research Center on 11 July 2018 revealed that 57% of Russians "believe that the execution of the Royal family is a heinous unjustified crime", while 29% said "the last Russian emperor paid too high a price for his mistakes". Among those aged between 18 and 24, 46% believe that Nicholas II had to be punished for his mistakes. Only 3% of Russians "were certain that the Royal family's execution was the public's just retribution for the emperor's blunders". On the centenary of the murders, over 100,000 pilgrims took part in a procession led by Patriarch Kirill in Yekaterinburg, marching from the city center where the Romanovs were murdered to a monastery in Ganina Yama. There is a widespread legend that the remains of the Romanovs were completely destroyed at the Ganina Yama during the ritual murder and a profitable pilgrimage business developed there. Therefore, the found remains of the Romanovs, as well as the place of their burial in the Porosyonkov Log, are ignored. On the eve of the centennial, the Russian government announced that its new probe had confirmed once again that the bodies were the Romanovs'. The state also remained aloof from the commemoration, as President Vladimir Putin considers Nicholas II a weak ruler.

== See also ==
- The Black Book of Communism
- Bolshevism
- Ganina Yama
- List of unsolved murders (1900–1979)
- Princess Elisabeth of Hesse and by Rhine, killed at the same time as her imperial relatives
- Execution of Louis XVI
- Regicide

== Bibliography ==
- Bykov, Pavel Mikhailovich. The Last Days of Tsar Nicholas. New York: International Publishers. 1935.
- Cross, Anthony (2014). In the Lands of the Romanovs: An Annotated Bibliography of First-hand English-language Accounts of the Russian Empire (1613–1917). Cambridge, UK: Open Book Publishers. 2014. doi:10.11647/OBP.0042.
- Iurovsky, Iakov. The Romanov Regicide: Testimony of the Commandant of the "House of Special Purpose" in Ekaterinburg, Iakov Iurovsky. [1920] Corvallis, OR: 1000 Flowers, 2026.
- Massie, Robert K. (2012). The Romanovs: The Final Chapter. Random House. ISBN 978-0-307-87386-6.
- McNeal, Shay. The Secret Plot to Save the Tsar: New Truths Behind the Romanov Mystery. HarperCollins, 2003. ISBN 978-0-06-051755-7
- Montefiore, Simon Sebag. The Romanovs: 1613–1918. Alfred A. Knopf, 2016. ISBN 978-0307266521.
- Perry, John Curtis, and Constantine V. Pleshakov. The Flight of the Romanovs: A Family Saga. Basic Books (A Member of the Perseus Books Group), 1999. ISBN 0-465-02463-7.
- Pringle, Robert W. Historical Dictionary of Russian and Soviet Intelligence. Rowman & Littlefield, 2015. ISBN 978-1-4422-5318-6 (e-book).
- Radzinsky, Edvard. The Last Tsar: The Life and Death of Nicholas II. (Random House, 2011).
- Rappaport, Helen. Four Sisters: The Lost Lives of the Romanov Grand Duchesses. Pan Macmillan, 2014. ISBN 978-1-4472-5935-0.
- Rappaport, Helen. The Last Days of the Romanovs: Tragedy at Ekaterinburg. St. Martin's Griffin, 2010. ISBN 978-0312603472.
- Rappaport, Helen (2018). The Race to Save the Romanoffs. New York: St Martin's Press. ISBN 978-1-250-15121-6.
- Slater, Wendy. The Many Deaths of Tsar Nicholas II: Relics, Remains and the Romanovs (Routledge, 2007).
- Steinberg, Mark D. The Fall of the Romanovs: Political Dreams and Personal Struggles in a Time of Revolution (Yale, 1995); with Vladimir M. Khrustalev.
- Tames, R. (1972). Last of the Tsars. Pan Books. ISBN 0330029029.
- Welch, Frances (2018). The Imperial Tea Party: Family, Politics and Betrayal: The Ill-fated British and Russian Royal Alliance. London: Short Books. ISBN 978-1-78072-306-8.
