= Alexander Avdonin =

Russian archeologist (1932–2026)

- Александр Авдонин
- Born: 10 June 1932; Sverdlovsk, Russian SFSR, Soviet Union
- Died: 20 February 2026 (aged 93)
- Occupations: Mineralogist, archeologist

Alexander Nikolayevich Avdonin (Russian: Александр Николаевич Авдонин; 10 June 1932 – 20 February 2026) was a Russian who was the first known person, in 1979, to begin exhuming the grave of the seven murdered Romanovs and four members of their household. He was born in Sverdlovsk in the Soviet Union, where the Romanovs were murdered in 1918.

== Legend of the Romanovs' murderer ==
The imperial Romanov family (former Tsar Nicholas II, Empress Alexandra, their children Olga, Tatiana, Maria, Anastasia, and Alexei, and their loyal retainers Dr. Evgeny Botkin, Anna Demidova, Ivan Kharitonov and Alexei Trupp) were murdered en masse in a ground-floor room of their final place of imprisonment, Yekaterinburg’s Ipatiev House, by Bolshevik gunfire, bayonets, and blows in July 1918, and their bodies allegedly buried in the Siberian Koptyaki forest, a short distance from Yekaterinburg, near a spot historically known as the Four Brothers, that night. This was the legend, known to many local residents, including the young Avdonin, who had vivid childhood memories of one of the assassins, Pyotr Ermakov, roaming the environs of his hometown and bragging of the deed. Ermakov was famous both for his drinking and for his stirring addresses at schools and Pioneer gatherings about how he and his Bolshevik comrades had so bravely struck down the Tsar whom the revolutionaries had named "Nicholas the Bloody". Various members (Yurovsky, Ermakov, Medvedev) of the squad of assassins—who by one account outnumbered the eleven victims—vied for years for the honor of having personally shot the Tsar; documents, filmed interviews, and some of the weapons used in the murder themselves, complete with signed statements, were proudly donated to state museums and archives. Gradually, however, as the Joseph Stalin regime systematically persecuted and killed so many of the original revolutionaries, this sort of discourse became unthinkable. Sverdlovsk itself was essentially closed to foreigners.

== Interest in graves' location ==
Avdonin, a geologist by trade in the Soviet years, was also personally interested in local history and folklore, which in Sverdlovsk had to include the murder of the Romanovs. Indeed, the Ipatiev House, at 49 Voznesensky Prospekt—the leafy end of the town’s main street—where the family was imprisoned and murdered, was called at the time the House of Special Purpose and maintained for some years afterward as the Museum of the Peoples’ Vengeance. Avdonin gathered information informally for years, and, in 1976, met Soviet writer and filmmaker Geli Ryabov, who was given information by the son of one of the killers that led them to identify a precise location and to begin informal exhumations. According to the “Yurovsky Note” a primary historical document authored by the commandant of the Ipatiev House and chief executioner Yakov Yurovsky, the bodies (nine of the eleven) were buried at the place where the truck broke down on the second night following the murder, near Grade Crossing 184 on the Koptyaki Road. Pots of acid had been smashed into the pit to consume the naked remains, and railroad ties had been placed over the pit before a layer of earth.

== Exhumation of Romanovs' graves ==
In the spring of 1979, Avdonin and Ryabov began an exhumation of the site, struck the rotted wood of the ties at what they judged a reasonable depth, and dug on. Their methods, though clumsy and potentially destructive to later efforts by professional archaeologists, resulted in the recovery of several skulls. They refilled the pit, kept the skulls briefly, and reburied them with icons and prayers.

Due to the generally repressive Soviet climate, neither Avdonin nor Ryabov said a word about this until ten years later, when Ryabov, in 1989, released the story into the media, causing a rift between the two men.

The site has been treated and explored according to the standards of neither professional archaeology nor careful law-enforcement investigative technique. The official government re-opening in 1991 featured bulldozers, for instance, not archaeological equipment appropriate for such delicate excavation and recovery. The professional observer stood by in anguish as non-professionals sloshed through the pit, grabbing at bits of ceramic or bone. Evidence indicates that the pit was opened at least once between the re-burial efforts and the "official" opening. Two of the bodies of the Imperial Family were missing: that of the tsarevich, Alexei, and the remains of either Maria or Anastasia. In July 2007, an amateur historian discovered bones near Yekaterinburg belonging to a boy and young woman. Prosecutors reopened the investigation into the deaths of the imperial family and, in April 2008, DNA tests performed by an American laboratory proved that bone fragments exhumed in the Ural Mountains belonged to two children of Nicholas II, Alexei and a daughter. That same day it was announced by Russian authorities that remains from the entire family had been recovered.

In September/October 1998 and June 1999, the first search and second search were carried out at Ganina Yama using archeological techniques, seismic profiling, and electromagnetic studies as well as hand tools.

In July 2004, the third search was carried out in the northern part of the Pig's Meadow, where Alexander Avdonin originally found the nine sets of remains. Ground-penetrating radar was used with hand tools as well as scraping the top 8 cm of the soil with a machine in order to bring the soil level down to that of the 1918 era. In July 2007, the remains of two young people were found in the southern part of the Pig's Meadow, approximately 70 meters from the first grave site.

Forty-four bone fragments were found in total. Captain Peter Sarandinaki brought onboard forensic anthropologist Dr. Anthony Falsetty and the U.S. Army DNA Laboratory to examine and test the purported remains of the Tsarevich Alexei and those of his sister (either Grand Duchess Maria or Anastasia).

== Personal life and death ==
Avdonin was born in Sverdlovsk, Soviet Union on 10 June 1932. He died on 20 February 2026, at the age of 93.

== Sources ==
- King, Greg and Wilson, Penny. The Fate of the Romanovs. New York: John Wiley & Sons, 2003.
- Massie, Robert. The Romanovs: The Final Chapter. New York: Random House, 1995.
- Radzinsky, Edvard. The Last Tsar. New York: Doubleday, 1992.
