= Ivan Kharitonov =

Russian saint (1870–1918)

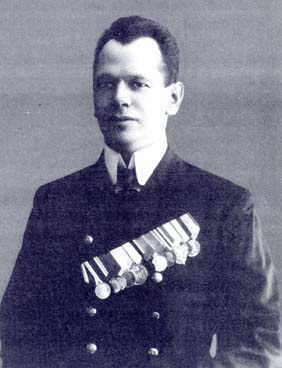
Ivan Kharitonov

Ivan Mikhailovich Kharitonov (Russian: Иван Михайлович Харитонов; 14 June 1870 – 17 July 1918) was the head cook at the court of Tsar Nicholas II of Russia.

== Biography ==
He followed the Romanov family into internal exile following the Russian Revolution of 1917 and was murdered with them by the Bolsheviks on 17 July 1918 at Ipatiev House, Yekaterinburg, Russian Soviet Republic.

Like the Romanovs, Kharitonov was canonized as a passion-bearer of Soviet oppression by the Russian Orthodox Church Outside Russia in 1991.

Kharitonov's wife and daughter followed him into exile at Tobolsk but did not join him when the Bolsheviks moved the prisoners to Ekaterinburg in the spring of 1918.

Kharitonov's grandson attended the funeral held on 17 July 1998 in Peter and Paul Cathedral in Saint Petersburg for his grandfather, the Romanovs, their servants (Anna Demidova and Alexei Trupp), and the other victims who were murdered eighty years before.

== See also ==
- Romanov sainthood
- Murder of the Romanov Family
