= Boris Didkovsky =

Russian revolutionary (1883–1937)

Boris Vladimirovich Didkovsky Борис Владимирович Дидковский
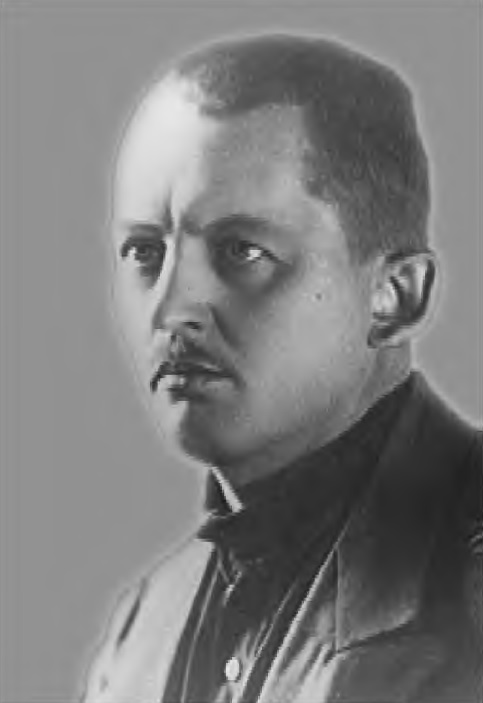
- Born: 1 May 1883; Zhitomir, Russian Empire
- Died: 13 August 1937 (aged 54); Sverdlovsk, Russian SFSR, Soviet Union
- Cause of death: Execution by shooting
- Education: University of Geneva
- Occupations: Geologist, Teacher

Boris Vladimirovich Didkovsky (Russian: Борис Владимирович Дидковский) (1 May 1883 – 13 August 1937) was a Bolshevik revolutionary, Soviet geologist, teacher and rector of the Ural State University.

== Biography ==
Didkovsky was born in 1883 in Zhitomir, modern Ukraine, in the family of an officer.

He studied at the Kiev Cadet Corps, in 1900–1904 he was a student at the Saint Petersburg Electrotechnical University and a volunteer at the Physics and Mathematics Faculty of St. Petersburg University.

In 1913 he graduated from the University of Geneva as a Bachelor of Mathematics and Geological Sciences, the scientific advisor was Louis Duparc.

In 1913–1917, Didkovsky, returning to Russia, was engaged in geological research of the Northern Urals, having received the position of chief geologist of the Nikolae-Pavdinsky mountain district. During these years 1913–1917, he conducted a topographic and geological survey of the district, prospecting for deposits of platinum, gold, coal, iron, etc. He was the manager of the dredge, during his reign they switched from artisanal to mechanized mining of platinum at the mine.

Until 1907 he was with the Social Democrats, however in 1907 he went to the side of anarchists. Then in March 1917 he joined the RSDLP (b), was the chairman of the food administration in Verkhoturye, led the armed detachments, participated in the Petrograd Congress of Deputies, where he prepared a government decree on the nationalization of the Ural industry. Having returned, from October 1918, he led the defense of the Kytlymo-Pavdinsky region.

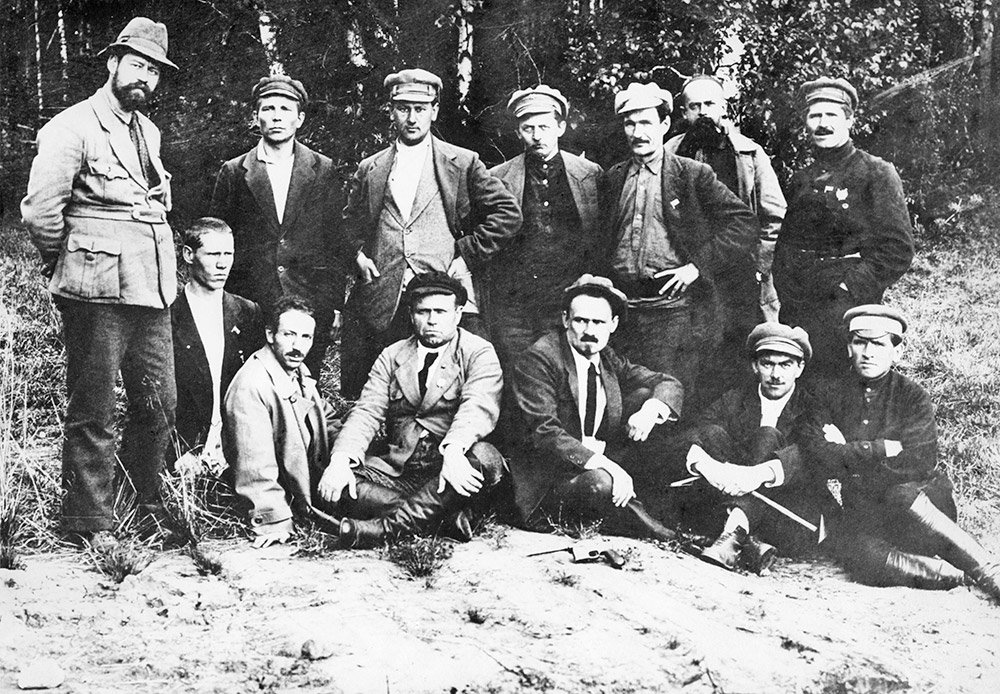
1924 Photograph of Ural Bolsheviks From left to right: Top 1st row – A. I. Paramonov, N. N., M. M. Kharitonov, B.V. Didkovsky, I. P. Rumyantsev, N. N., A. L. Borchaninov; Bottom 2nd row – D. E. Sulimov, G.S. Frost, M.V. Vasilyev, V.M. Bykov, A.G. Kabanov, P. S. Ermakov.

After the Bolshevik Revolution took place, Didkovsky was elected to the Ural Regional Soviet in Yekaterinburg and occupied an influential position here as the Deputy Chairman under Alexander Beloborodov. In all cases of Beloborodov's absence, Didkovsky replaced him in the regional council of deputies. Towards the end of the power of the Soviets in Yekaterinburg in the spring-early summer of 1918, there was a disagreement between Didkovsky and Beloborodov, and two parties were formed in the council, mutually hostile. However, the presidium, led by Goloshchekin, Tolmachyov and Safarov was on the side of Beloborodov, and Didkovsky's party did not develop significantly.

Despite the upbringing abroad and the appearance of an intellectual, Didkovsky was considered by many of his fellows an uncultured, rude and boorish person. By the findings of the White commission set up to investigate the regicide, he was not invited to intimate meetings of the presidium and, apparently, was never initiated into the conspiracy of the Soviet ringleaders regarding the execution of the Tsar's family, since the name of Didkovsky is not found in any materials related to the preparation and commission of the murder, though he was present alongside Beloborodov and several other members of the Ural Soviet when the Romanovs arrived in Yekaterinburg on 30 April 1918. Historians Greg King and Penny Wilson, however, cite Didkovsky's presence at the meeting of the soviet on 29 June 1918 when it was unanimously decided the family would be killed, as Yekaterinburg was about to fall to the White Front. Wilson and King referred to the testimony of one of the chekists, Grigory Nikulin, who was present at the meeting along with his superior Yakov Yurovsky and mentioned Didkovsky as among those present. Didkovsky later visited the Romanov's burial site along with a number of other Ural Bolsheviks, including several of the men involved in the shooting.

From 1920 to 1923 he served as the manager of the regional ore administration of Yekaterinburg, since August 1920 the chairman of the Mining Council of the Supreme Economic Council in the Urals, was a member of the organizing committee of the Ural State University, was a teacher of higher mathematics and vice-rector for administrative and economic part of the Ural University, since the fall of 1921 to 1924 – rector of USU. At this time, Didkovsky created new departments of prospecting and exploration of minerals, organized the publication of "News of the Ural State University".

From 1926 to 1930 he taught at the Ural State Technical University as an associate professor, head of the department of prospecting and exploration of minerals. In 1930 – February 1936 he was the manager of the Ural Geological Trust, director of the Ural Geological Research Institute.

On January 30, 1937, he was arrested, on August 10, 1937, he was sentenced, and on August 13, 1937, he was shot in Sverdlovsk as "an active member of the anti-Soviet terrorist organization of the right in the Urals." On September 22, 1956 he was rehabilitated.
