= Alexei Trupp =

Head footman to Emperor Nicholas II of Russia

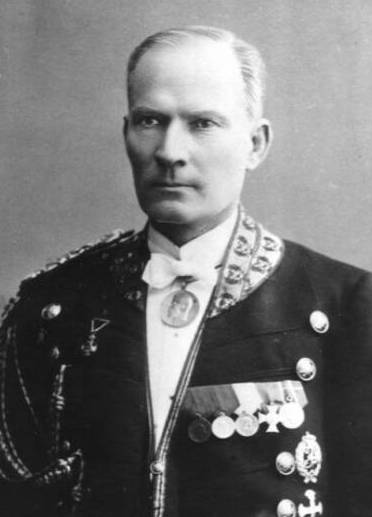
- Born: Aloizs Lauris Trūps; 8 April 1856; Kalnagals, Vitebsk Governorate, Russian Empire
- Died: 17 July 1918 (aged 62); Ipatiev House, Yekaterinburg, Russian Soviet Republic
- Cause of death: Murder by firing squad
- Canonized: 1981, in New York by the Russian Orthodox Church Outside Russia

Aloise "Alexei" Yegorovich Trupp (Russian: Алоизий Егорович Трупп, Latvian: Aloizs Lauris Trūps; 8 April 1856 – 17 July 1918) was the Latvian head footman in the household of Tsar Nicholas II of Russia.

Trupp was an ethnic Latgalian, born in Rezhitsky Uyezd, in the Vitebsk Governorate of the Russian Empire (now Madona Municipality, Latvia). He was murdered with the Romanov family at Ipatiev House in Yekaterinburg following the Russian Revolution of 1917. He is buried in the Chapel of Saint Catherine the Martyr within the Saints Peter and Paul Cathedral.

Together with the royal family, Trupp was canonized as a martyr by the Russian Orthodox Church Outside Russia in 1981, even though he was a Roman Catholic. The Moscow Patriarchate canonized the royal family as Passion Bearers in 2000, but did not canonize Trupp.

== See also ==
- Romanov sainthood
