= Outline of the Red Terror (Russia) =

Red Terror
- Part of the Russian Civil War
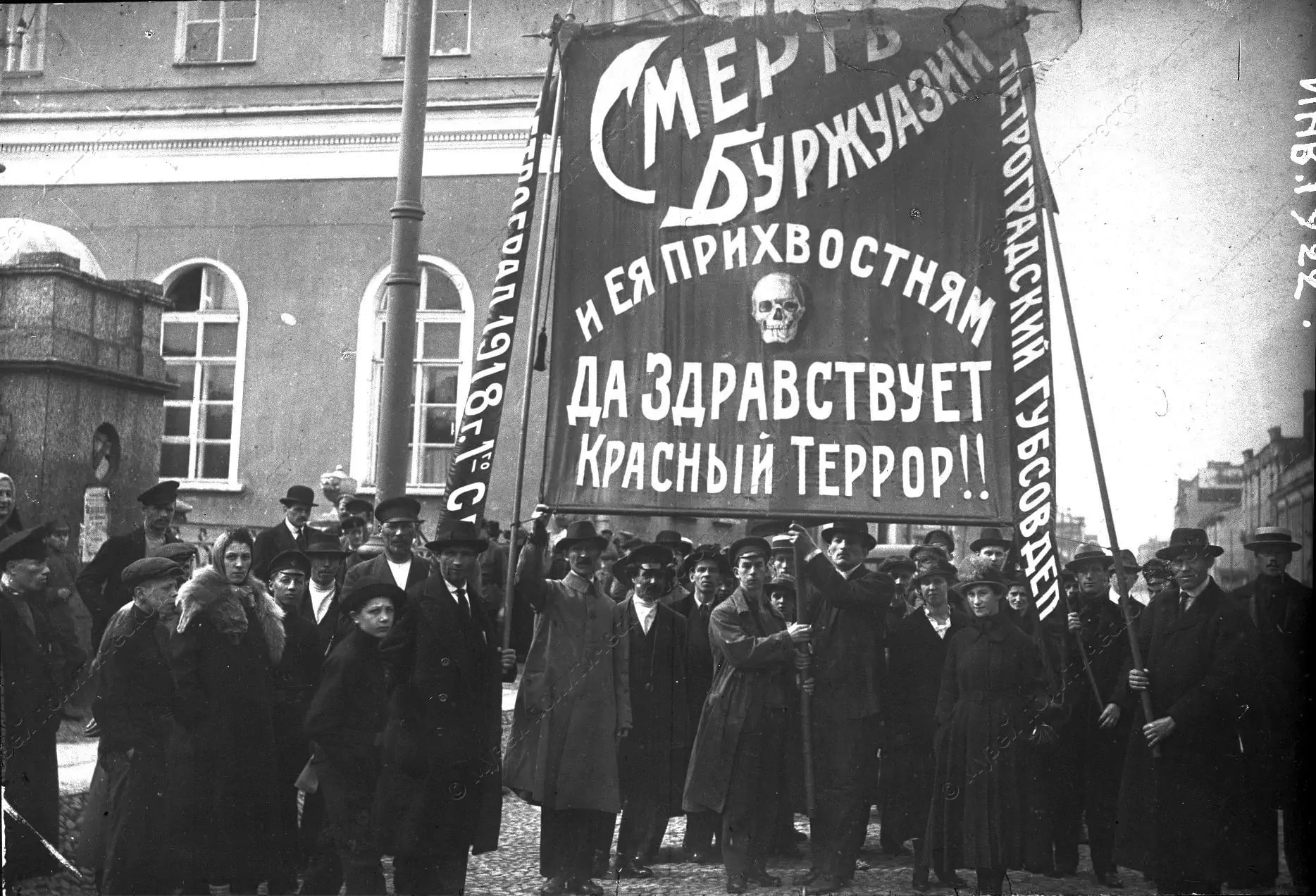
- Propaganda poster in Petrograd, 1918: "Death to the bourgeoisie and its lapdogs – Long live the Red Terror!!" (Note: The orthography used on the poster is generally in line with the 1918 Bolshevik reform except for ея, a pre-revolutionary form of её (female pronoun).)
- Native name: Красный террор (post-1918 orthography); Красный терроръ (pre-1918 orthography)
- Date: August 1918 – February 1922
- Location: Soviet Russia
- Motive: Political repression
- Target: Anti-Bolshevik groups, clergy, rival socialists, counter-revolutionaries, peasants, and dissidents
- Organized by: Cheka
- Deaths: Mainstream estimates range between 50,000 and 600,000

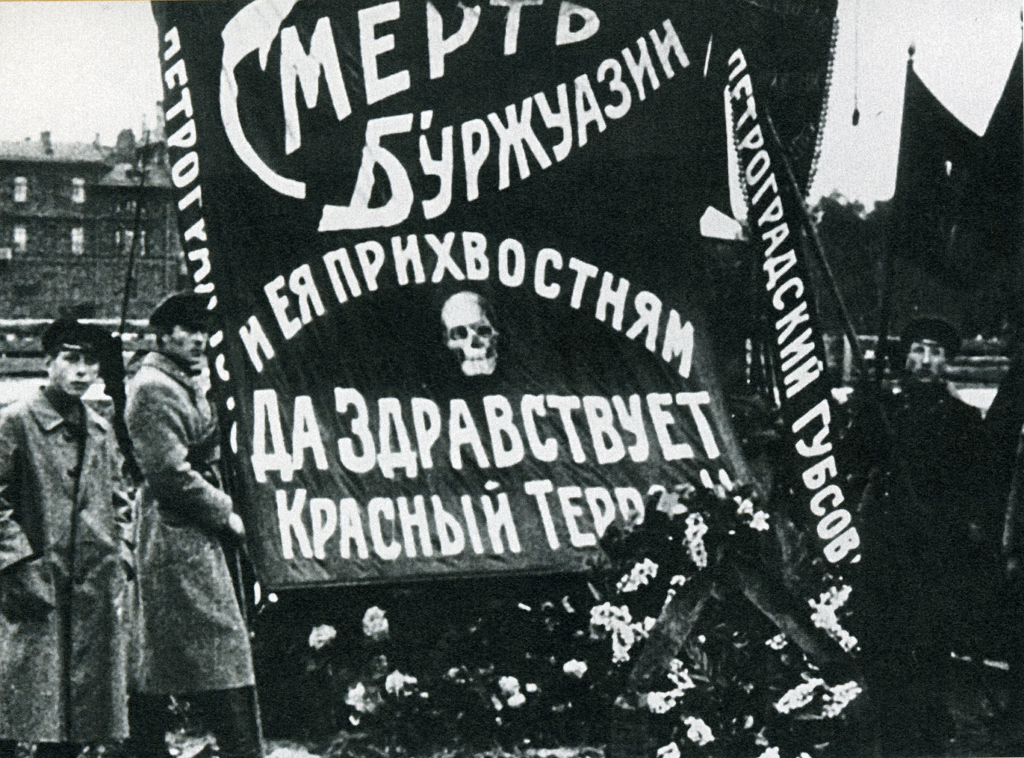
Red Terror

The following outline is provided as an overview of and topical guide to English Wikipedia articles about the Red Terror.

The Red Terror (Russian: красный террор, romanized: krasnyy terror) was a campaign of political repression and mass executions in Soviet Russia carried out by the Bolsheviks, mainly through the Cheka, their secret police force. It began officially in September 1918 and continued until 1922. The Red Terror was launched after assassination attempts on Vladimir Lenin and the killings of Petrograd Cheka chief Moisei Uritsky and party editor V. Volodarsky. Inspired by the Reign of Terror during the French Revolution, its goal was to crush political opposition and secure Bolshevik control. Bolshevik leader Leon Trotsky defended the use of terror, arguing it was a necessary response to the White Terror that began in 1917.

== Overview ==
- Red Terror – A campaign of mass arrests, executions, and repression by the Bolsheviks during the Russian Civil War (1918–1922).
- White Terror (Russia) – A campaign of political repression, killings, and persecution carried out by anti-Bolshevik forces during the Russian Civil War, targeting communists, sympathizers, and civilians.
- Political repression in the Soviet Union
- Russian Revolution and Russian Civil War
- De-Cossackization – Soviet policy of political repression and mass killing targeting the Cossacks during the Civil War.
- Opposition to Russian Orthodox Church during the Russian Civil War – Bolshevik persecution of clergy and believers as part of the Red Terror.

== Events ==
- Murder of the Romanov family – Execution of Tsar Nicholas II and his family by Bolsheviks in 1918, considered part of the broader Red Terror.
- Tagantsev conspiracy – Alleged anti-Soviet plot in Petrograd in 1922 used by the Cheka to justify mass arrests and executions.
- Tartu Credit Center Massacre – Execution of hostages by retreating Bolsheviks in Estonia in 1919, as part of the Red Terror.
- Yaroslavl Uprising – Anti-Bolshevik rebellion in July 1918, violently suppressed by the Red Army with mass reprisals.
- Nikolayevsk incident – 1920 massacre of Japanese citizens and White Russians by Bolshevik partisans in the Russian Far East.

== Locations ==
- Ipatiev House – Location in Yekaterinburg where the Romanov family was executed.
- Ganina Yama – Burial site of the Romanov family after their execution.

== Individuals ==
=== Perpetrators ===
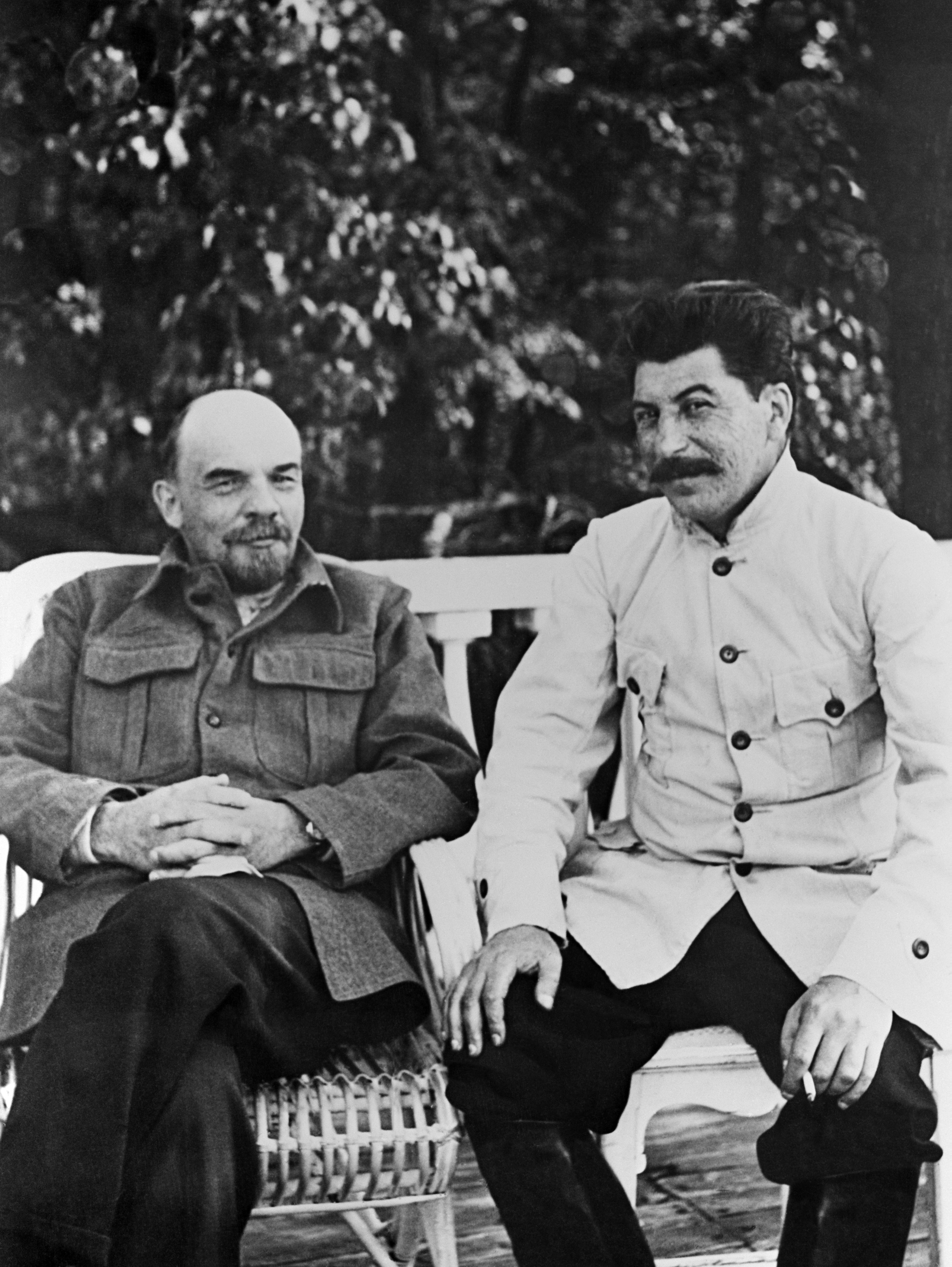
Joseph Stalin and Vladimir Lenin (c.1922)

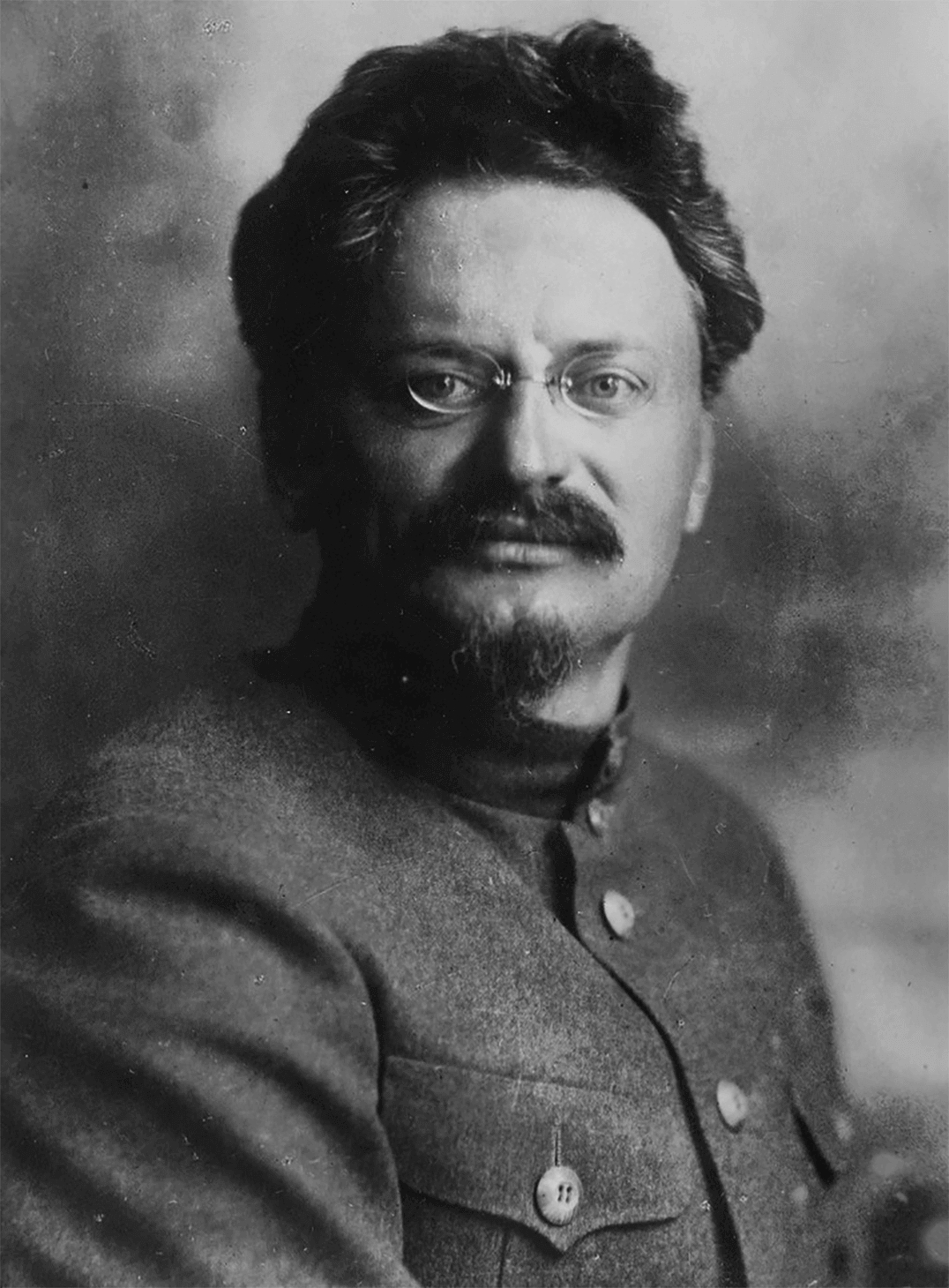
Leon Trotsky (c.1920)

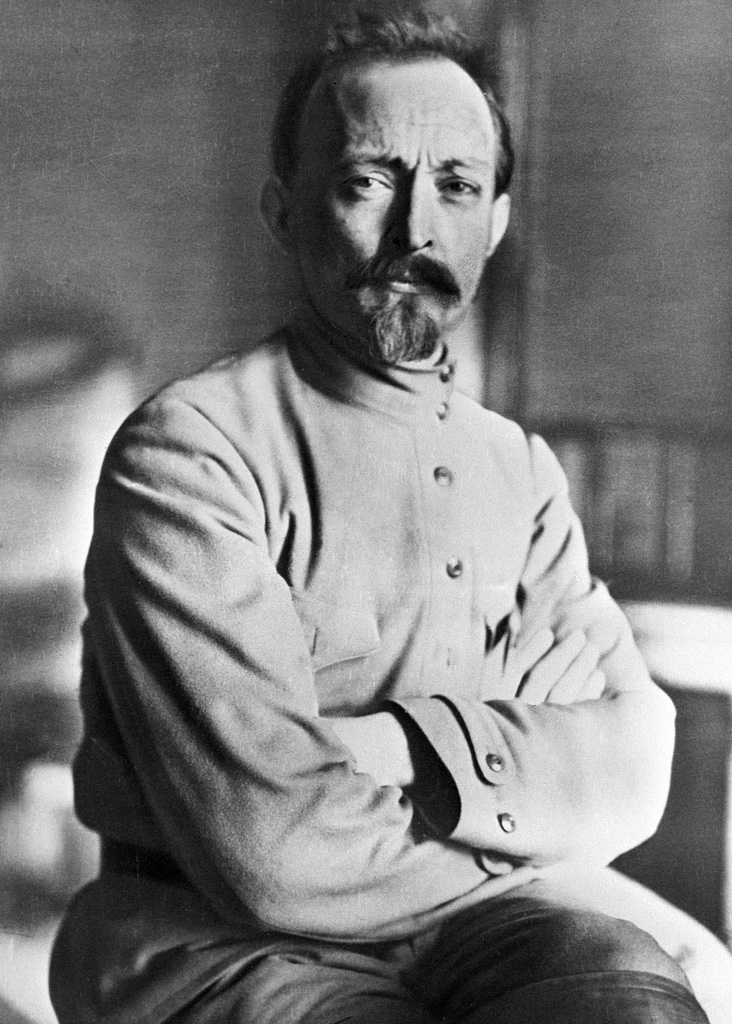
Felix Dzerzhinsky (c.1920)

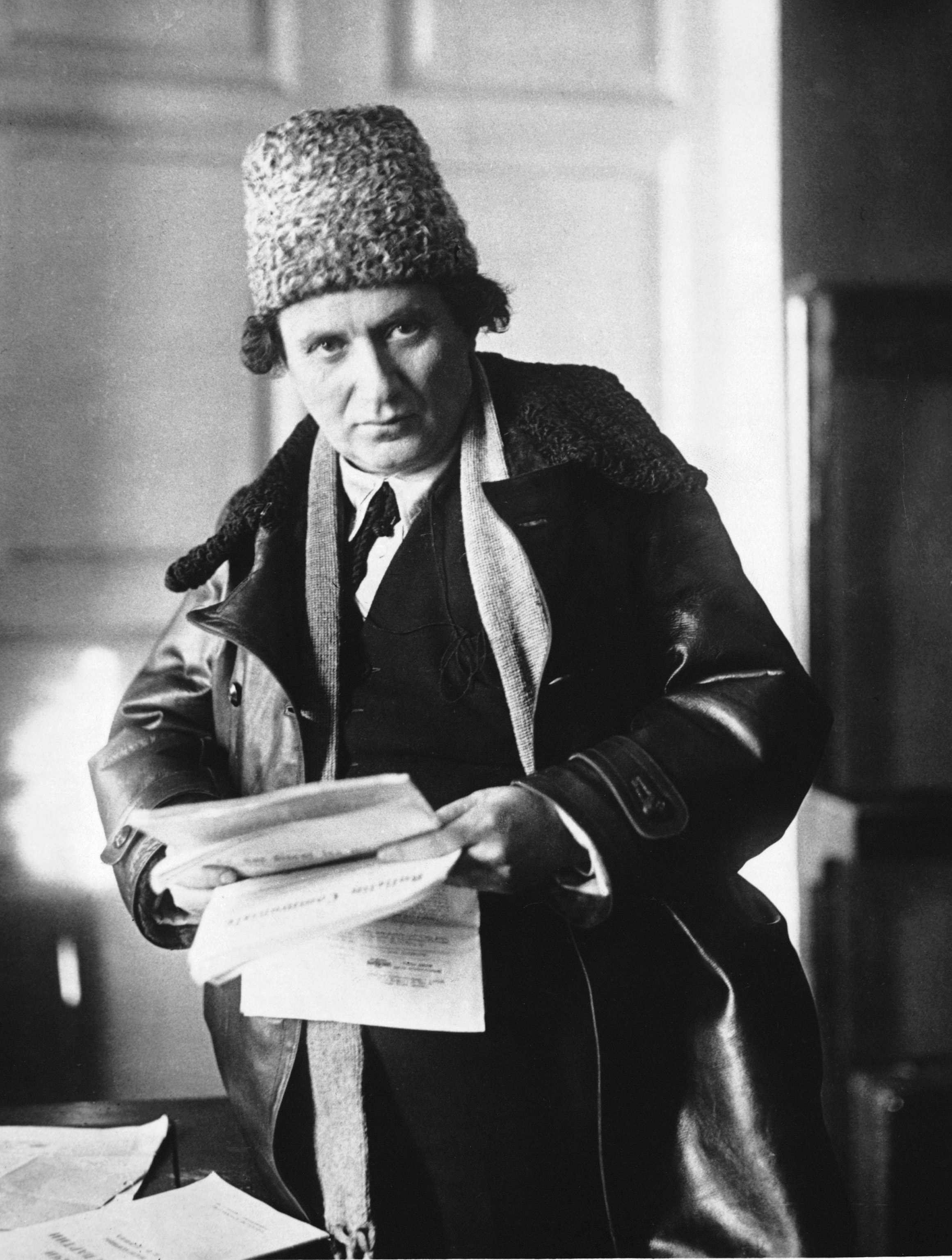
Grigory Zinoviev (c.1920)

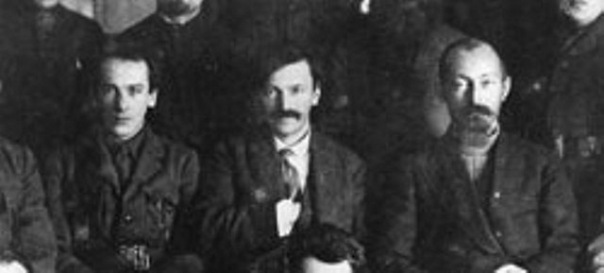
Genrikh Yagoda, Vyacheslav Menzhinsky, Felix Dzerzhinsky (c.1924)

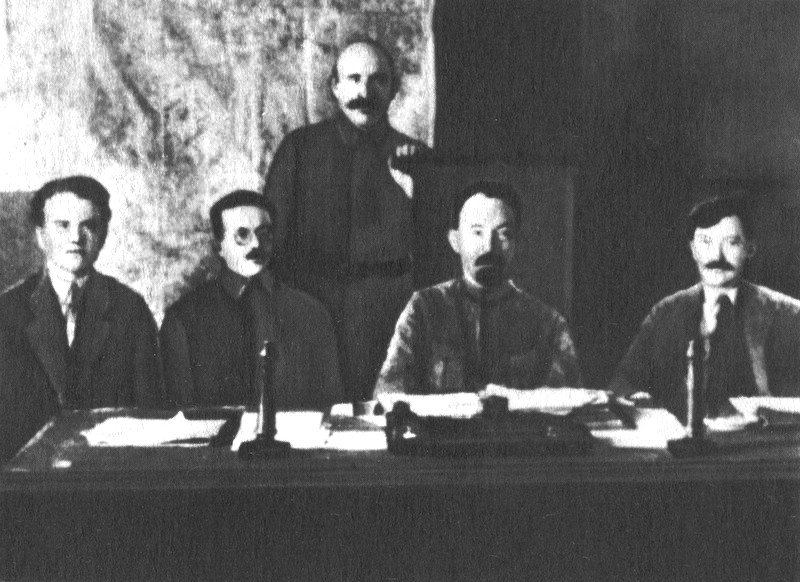
Members of the presidium of VCheKa (left to right) Yakov Peters, Józef Unszlicht, Abram Belenky (standing), Felix Dzerzhinsky, Vyacheslav Menzhinsky, (c.1921)

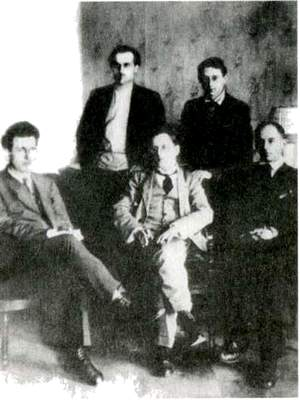
Petrograd Cheka, Urizky Boky, (c.1918)

- Georges Agabekov – Soviet intelligence officer who defected to the West in 1930.
- Nikolai Antipov – Head of the Petrograd Cheka in 1919.
- Vladimir Antonov-Ovseenko – Bolshevik leader who directed the storming of the Winter Palace during the October Revolution.
- Georgi Atarbekov – Cheka official known for his brutal methods during the Russian Civil War.
- Vsevolod Balitsky – Head of the NKVD in Ukraine, involved in political repression during the 1930s.
- Alexander Beloborodov – Bolshevik revolutionary involved in the execution of the Romanov family.
- Yan Karlovich Berzin – Head of Soviet military intelligence (GRU) and participant in the Red Terror.
- Georgy Blagonravov – Soviet security official who played a role in suppressing opposition during the Civil War.
- Gleb Bokii – Senior Cheka officer involved in implementing the Red Terror and early Gulag system.
- Yevgenia Bosch – Bolshevik revolutionary and one of the first female Soviet leaders.
- Semyon Dukelsky – Cheka officer who enforced Bolshevik policies and suppressed dissent.
- Felix Dzerzhinsky – Founder and head of the Cheka, instrumental in orchestrating the Red Terror.
- Aleksandr Eiduk – Cheka official involved in political repression and executions.
- Mikhail Frunze – Red Army commander who led Bolshevik forces during the Civil War.
- Filipp Goloshchyokin – Soviet official who played a role in the execution of the Romanov family.
- Mikhail Kedrov – Cheka officer known for his extreme methods during the Red Terror.
- Sergei Kirov – Prominent Bolshevik leader whose assassination led to the Great Purge.
- Nikolay Komarov – Soviet official involved in the administration of the Cheka.
- Grigory Kotovsky – Bolshevik military leader who commanded Red Army units during the Civil War.
- Nikolai Krylenko – Soviet legal official involved in show trials and executions.
- Ivan Ksenofontov – Deputy head of the Cheka who played a role in internal security.
- Béla Kun – Hungarian communist revolutionary who participated in Soviet political activities.
- Kārlis Landers – Latvian Bolshevik involved in revolutionary activities.
- Martin Latsis – Senior Cheka official who advocated for class-based repression.
- Vladimir Lenin – Leader of the Bolshevik Revolution and head of the Soviet state; authorized the use of terror against political opponents.
- Mikhail Artemyevich Muravyov – Red Army commander known for harsh measures during the Civil War.
- Sergo Ordzhonikidze – Bolshevik leader who played a significant role in the Soviet government.
- Yakov Peters – Deputy head of the Cheka involved in implementing the Red Terror.
- Grigory Petrovsky – Bolshevik revolutionary and Soviet statesman.
- Yakov Sverdlov – Bolshevik party administrator and head of the All-Russian Central Executive Committee.
- Joseph Stalin – Bolshevik revolutionary who later became the leader of the Soviet Union; involved in the Red Terror.
- Pyotr Stuchka – Bolshevik revolutionary and Soviet official.
- Leon Trotsky – Bolshevik revolutionary, Lenin's number two, and Commissar for Military and Naval Affairs.
- Yakov Tryapitsyn – Red Army commander responsible for the Nikolayevsk incident.
- Moisei Uritsky – Head of the Petrograd Cheka, assassinated in 1918.
- Varvara Yakovleva – Bolshevik revolutionary and deputy head of the Petrograd Cheka.
- Genrikh Yagoda – Head of the NKVD who oversaw political repression and purges.
- Leonid Zakovsky – Soviet security official involved in the Great Purge.
- Rosalia Zemlyachka – Bolshevik revolutionary nicknamed "Demon" and "Bloody Rosa", who promised Wrangel's white troops amnesty in 1920 before massacring them.
- Andrei Zhelyabov – Russian revolutionary and member of Narodnaya Volya.
- Grigory Zinoviev – Bolshevik revolutionary and head of the Communist International.
- Felix Dzerzhinsky – Bolshevik revolutionary and founder of the Cheka, the Soviet secret police.
- Peter Ermakov – Bolshevik revolutionary who participated in the execution of the Romanov family.
- Alexey Georgievich Kabanov – Bolshevik revolutionary involved in the execution of the Romanov family.
- Fyodor Lukoyanov – Bolshevik revolutionary and member of the Ural Regional Soviet.
- Mikhail Medvedev-Kudrin – Bolshevik revolutionary who claimed to have shot Nicholas II.
- Pavel Spiridonovich Medvedev – Bolshevik revolutionary and head of the guard at the Ipatiev House.
- Grigory Petrovich Nikulin – Bolshevik revolutionary who participated in the execution of the Romanov family.
- Nikolay Tolmachyov – Bolshevik revolutionary and member of the Ural Regional Soviet.
- Stepan Vaganov – Bolshevik revolutionary and member of the execution squad.
- Pyotr Voykov – Bolshevik revolutionary who facilitated the disposal of the Romanov bodies.
- Yakov Yurovsky – Bolshevik revolutionary and chief executioner of the Romanov family.
- Alexander Beloborodov – Bolshevik revolutionary and Soviet politician; played a key role in ordering the execution of Nicholas II and his family; executed during the Great Purge in 1938.
- Boris Didkovsky – Soviet revolutionary and member of the Ural Regional Soviet; involved in the decision to execute the Romanovs; executed during the Great Purge.
- Filipp Goloshchyokin – Bolshevik revolutionary and Soviet official; instrumental in the execution of the Romanov family; executed during the Great Purge.
- Gavril Myasnikov – Bolshevik revolutionary; participated in the execution of the Romanovs; later became a dissident and was executed in 1945.
- Yevgeni Preobrazhensky – Bolshevik economist and politician; although not directly involved in the execution, he was associated with the regime; executed during the Great Purge.
- Georgy Safarov – Bolshevik revolutionary and Soviet official; involved in the early Soviet government; executed during the Great Purge.

=== Victims ===
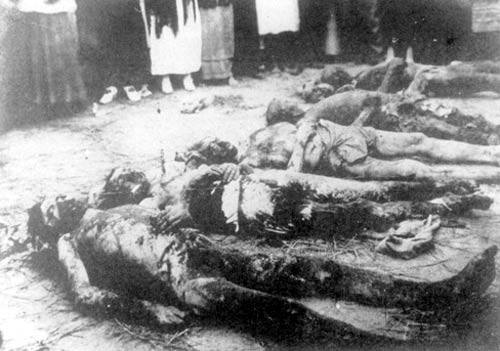
Red terror victims

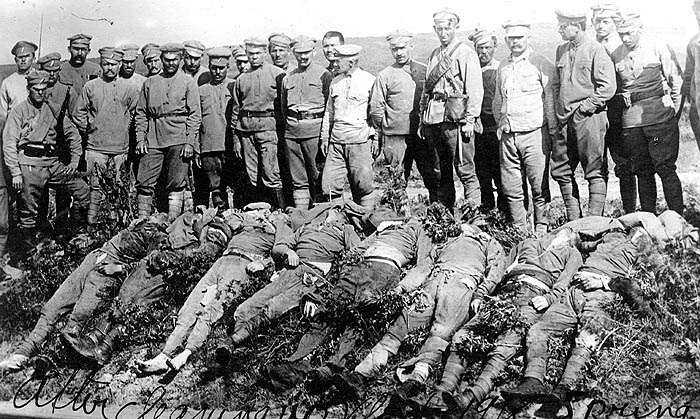
Czechoslovak victims of the Bolsheviks near Vladivostok

==== Whites ====
- Martyrs of Alapayevsk – Group of Russian royals and their associates executed by the Bolsheviks in 1918.
- Alexandra Feodorovna (Alix of Hesse) – Empress of Russia as the spouse of Nicholas II; executed by the Bolsheviks in 1918.
- Alexei Nikolaevich, Tsarevich of Russia – Heir apparent to the Russian throne; executed with his family in 1918.
- Grand Duchess Anastasia Nikolaevna of Russia – Youngest daughter of Nicholas II; executed with her family in 1918.
- Andronik Nikolsky – Russian Orthodox bishop and martyr; executed during the Red Terror.
- Mikhail Bakhirev – Russian naval officer; executed by the Bolsheviks in 1920.
- Benjamin of Petrograd – Russian Orthodox bishop; executed during the Red Terror.
- Konon Berman-Yurin – Russian revolutionary and Soviet official; executed during the Red Terror.
- Nikolay Bestchetvertnoi – Russian revolutionary; executed during the Red Terror.
- Nikolai Bobyr – Russian military officer; executed during the Red Terror.
- Maria Bochkareva – Founder of the Women's Battalion of Death; executed by the Bolsheviks in 1920.
- Boris Dumenko – Red Army commander; executed during the Red Terror.
- Eugene Botkin – Court physician to the Romanovs; executed with the imperial family in 1918.
- Frīdrihs Briedis – Latvian military officer; executed by the Bolsheviks in 1918.
- Alexander Bulygin – Russian statesman; executed during the Red Terror.
- Noman Çelebicihan – Crimean Tatar politician and mufti; executed by the Bolsheviks in 1918.
- Prince Constantine Constantinovich of Russia – Member of the Russian imperial family; executed during the Red Terror.
- Anna Demidova – Lady-in-waiting to Empress Alexandra; executed with the imperial family in 1918.
- Radko Dimitriev – Bulgarian general and diplomat; executed during the Red Terror.
- Grand Duke Dmitry Konstantinovich of Russia – Member of the Russian imperial family; executed during the Red Terror.
- Vasily Alexandrovich Dolgorukov – Russian nobleman and courtier; executed during the Red Terror.
- Nikolai Dukhonin – Russian general; executed by Bolshevik forces in 1917.
- Princess Elisabeth of Hesse and by Rhine – German princess and Russian Orthodox nun; executed during the Red Terror.
- Olga Vasilievna Evdokimova – Russian noblewoman; executed during the Red Terror.
- Grand Duke George Mikhailovich of Russia (1863–1919) – Member of the Russian imperial family; executed during the Red Terror.
- Nikolai Gumilev – Russian poet and literary critic; executed during the Red Terror.
- Prince Igor Constantinovich of Russia – Member of the Russian imperial family; executed during the Red Terror.
- Prince John Konstantinovich of Russia – Member of the Russian imperial family; executed during the Red Terror.
- Fanny Kaplan – Socialist Revolutionary who attempted to assassinate Lenin; executed in 1918.
- Alexei Khvostov – Russian politician and former Minister of the Interior; executed during the Red Terror.
- Alexander Kolchak – Russian naval commander and leader of the anti-Bolshevik White forces; executed in 1920.
- Alexander Alexandrovich Makarov – Russian statesman and Minister of the Interior; executed during the Red Terror.
- Nikolay Maklakov – Russian politician and Minister of the Interior; executed during the Red Terror.
- Sergey Manukhin – Russian statesman; executed during the Red Terror.
- Grand Duchess Maria Nikolaevna of Russia – Daughter of Nicholas II; executed with her family in 1918.
- Michael Blagievsky – Russian Orthodox priest and martyr; executed during the Red Terror.
- Grand Duke Michael Alexandrovich of Russia – Younger brother of Nicholas II; executed during the Red Terror.
- Filipp Mironov – Red Army commander; executed during the Red Terror.
- Pavel Mishchenko – Russian general and politician; executed during the Red Terror.
- Huseyn Khan Nakhchivanski – Russian general of Azerbaijani origin; executed during the Red Terror.
- Volodymyr Pavlovych Naumenko – Ukrainian educator and public figure; executed during the Red Terror.
- Adrian Nepenin – Russian naval officer; executed during the Red Terror.
- Nicholas II – Last Emperor of Russia; executed with his family in 1918.
- Grand Duchess Olga Nikolaevna of Russia – Eldest daughter of Nicholas II; executed with her family in 1918.
- Vladimir Paley – Russian poet and nobleman; executed during the Red Terror.
- Grand Duke Paul Alexandrovich of Russia – Member of the Russian imperial family; executed during the Red Terror.
- Viktor Pepelyayev – Russian politician; executed during the Red Terror.
- Platon Kulbusch – Estonian Orthodox bishop and martyr; executed during the Red Terror.
- Alexander Protopopov – Russian politician and Minister of the Interior; executed during the Red Terror.
- Alexander Ragoza – Russian general and politician; executed during the Red Terror.
- Aleksandr Vladimirovich Razvozov – Russian admiral; executed during the Red Terror.
- Paul von Rennenkampf – Russian general; executed during the Red Terror.
- Sergey Rukhlov – Russian statesman; executed during the Red Terror.
- Nikolai Ruzsky – Russian general; executed during the Red Terror.
- Alexey Schastny – Russian naval officer; executed during the Red Terror.
- Leonid Sednev – Servant to the Romanov family; executed during the Red Terror.
- Grand Duke Sergei Mikhailovich of Russia – Member of the Russian imperial family; executed during the Red Terror.
- Ivan Shcheglovitov – Russian statesman and Minister of Justice; executed during the Red Terror.
- Andrei Shingarev – Russian politician; executed during the Red Terror.
- Dmitry Shipov – Russian politician and public figure; executed during the Red Terror.
- Nikolai Skrydlov – Russian admiral; executed during the Red Terror.
- Grand Duchess Tatiana Nikolaevna of Russia – Daughter of Nicholas II; executed with her family in 1918.
- Ilya Leonidovich Tatischev – Russian nobleman and courtier; executed during the Red Terror.
- Alexei Trupp – Servant to the Romanov family; executed during the Red Terror.
- Ümmügülsüm – Azerbaijani poet and public figure; executed during the Red Terror.
- Robert Viren – Russian admiral; executed during the Red Terror.
- Barbara (Yakovleva) – Russian Orthodox nun and martyr; executed during the Red Terror.
- Nikolai Yanushkevich – Russian general; executed during the Red Terror.
- Yakov Zhilinsky – Russian general; executed during the Red Terror.

==== Anarchists ====
- Fanya Baron – Lithuanian-born anarchist and member of the Anarchist Black Cross; executed by the Cheka in 1921.
- Lev Chernyi – Russian individualist anarchist and theorist; executed by the Cheka in 1921.
- Yosif Gotman – Ukrainian anarchist; executed during the Red Terror.
- Petro Havrylenko – Ukrainian anarchist and military commander in the Makhnovist movement; executed during the Red Terror.
- Semen Karetnyk – Ukrainian anarchist and military leader in the Makhnovist movement; executed during the Red Terror.
- Foma Kozhyn – Ukrainian anarchist and Makhnovist commander; executed during the Red Terror.
- Savelii Makhno – Brother of Nestor Makhno and participant in the anarchist movement; executed during the Red Terror.
- Dmitry Ivanovich Popov – Russian anarchist and military leader; executed during the Red Terror.

== Organizations and groups ==
- Cheka – The first Soviet state security organization, responsible for carrying out the Red Terror.
- Communist Party of the Soviet Union – The ruling political party of the Soviet Union, founded by the Bolsheviks.
- Bolsheviks – A faction of the Marxist Russian Social Democratic Labour Party that seized power during the October Revolution.
- Council of People's Commissars – The highest governmental authority under the Bolsheviks after the October Revolution.
- Red Army – The military force organized by the Bolsheviks during the Russian Civil War.
- Revolutionary tribunal (Russia) – Special courts established by the Bolsheviks to try political opponents during the Red Terror.
- White movement – A loose coalition of anti-Bolshevik forces during the Russian Civil War.

== Documents and publications ==
- The State and Revolution (1917) – Lenin's work justifying the use of violence and terror in the revolution.
- Lenin's hanging order (1918) – A directive by Lenin authorizing mass executions of counter-revolutionaries.
- Socialist Homeland is in Danger! (1918) – A proclamation by Lenin calling for intensified repression of counter-revolutionaries during the Russian Civil War.
- Terrorism and Communism (1921) – Trotsky's work justifying the use of violence and terror in the revolution. (Note: "In Defence of Terrorism" was the original English title for Trotsky's work later known as "Terrorism and Communism")

== Bibliography ==
- Bibliography of the Russian Revolution and Civil War § October Revolution

The works below all cover the October Revolution and carry extensive bibliographies for further research.

- Smith, S. A. (2017). Russia in Revolution: An Empire in Crisis, 1890 to 1928. New York: Oxford University Press.
- Engelstein, L. (2017). Russia in Flames: War, Revolution, Civil War, 1914–1921. New York: Oxford University Press.
- Figes, O. (1996). A People's Tragedy: A History of the Russian Revolution. New York: Viking.
- McMeekin, S. (2017). The Russian Revolution: A New History. New York: Basic Books.
- Smele, J. (2016). The "Russian" Civil Wars, 1916–1926: Ten Years That Shook the World. New York: Oxford University Press. (Note: Contains an extensive 46 pp. bibliography of English and non-English works on the "Russian" Civil Wars.)

== See also ==
- Category:Red Terror
- Index of articles related to the Russian Revolution and Civil War
- List of massacres in Russia
- Pogroms during the Russian Civil War
