= Fyodor Lukoyanov =

Fyodor Lukoyanov Фёдор Лукоянов
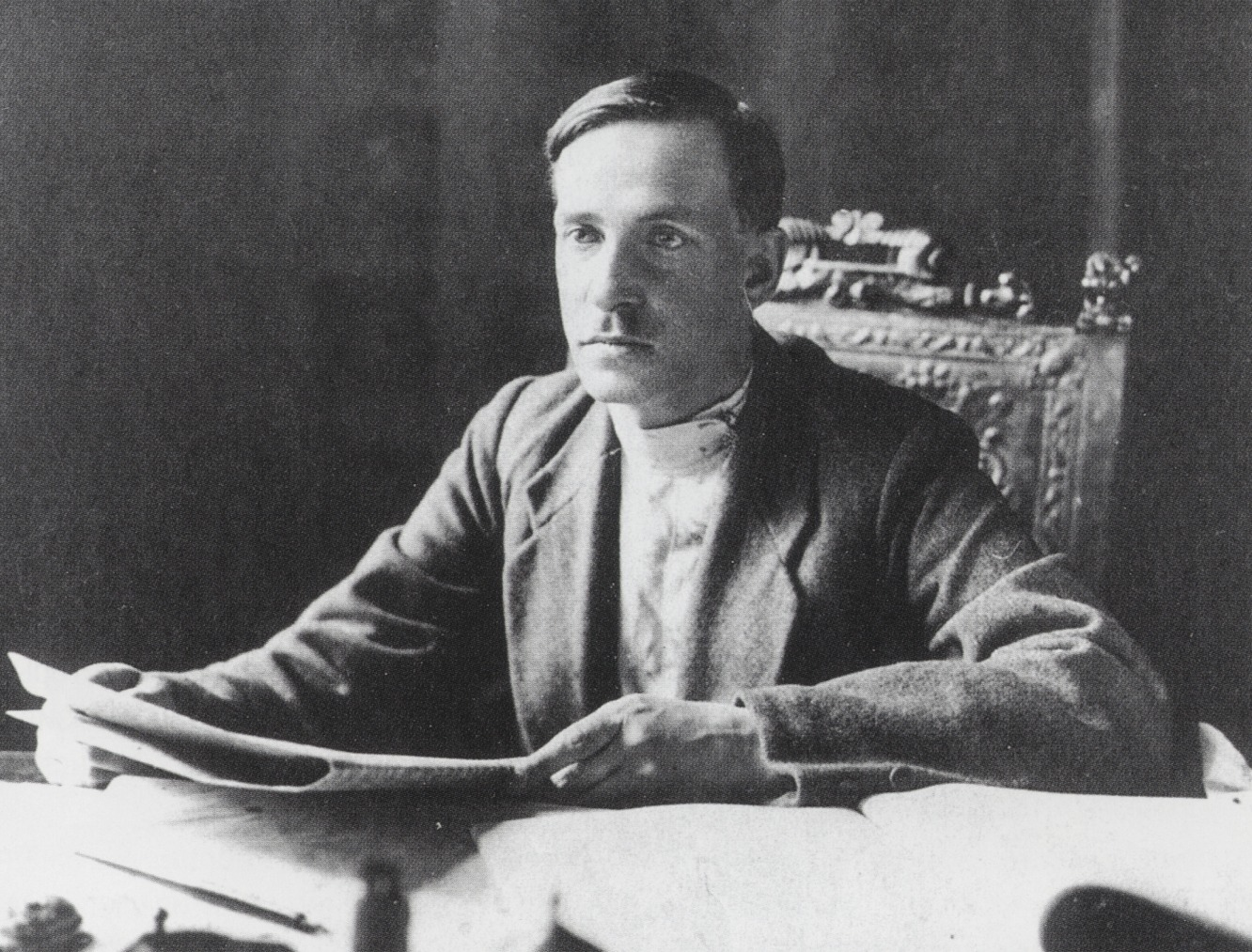
- Born: 1894; Kungursky Uyezd, Perm Governorate, Russian Empire
- Died: 1947 (aged 52–53); Moscow, Russian SFSR, Soviet Union

Fyodor Nikolaevich Lukoyanov (Russian: Фёдор Николаевич Лукоянов) (1894—1947) was a Bolshevik revolutionary, journalist, editor, and security officer.

== Biography ==
Born in 1894 in Kungursky Uyezd, from the Perm Governorate to the family of a treasury controller. His older brother Mikhail Nikolaevich was born in 1892. After grammar school, in 1912, he entered the law faculty of Moscow University and, while moonlighting, acquired the experience of a newspaper reporter. He studied at the university until August 1916.

He was a member of the RSDLP (Bolshevik) since the age of 19. He was fluent in English and German was considered an educated and talented journalist by the party. On O.S. October 29, 1917 by the decree of the Perm organization of the RSDLP(b), he was appointed editor of the newspaper "Proletarian Banner". He wrote his articles under the pseudonym "Maratov", in reference to the French revolutionary.

On March 15, 1918, he took up the post of head of the Perm District Cheka, and remained in this position until June 1918. His brother Mikhail served as the chairman of the Perm Soviet from December 21, 1917 to January 21, 1918, deputy chair until April 1918, and from April to December 1918, headed the provincial military commissariat in Perm. In June 1918, Grand Duke Mikhail Alexandrovich was kidnapped and killed in Perm by Gavril Myasnikov. The incident took place under the Lukoyanovs' watch.

On June 21, 1918, Fyodor was approved as the chairman of the Ural Regional Cheka and served as a member of the Ural Regional Soviet led by Alexander Beloborodov. His subordinates in the Cheka included Yakov Yurovsky, Grigory Nikulin, and Mikhail Medvedev-Kudrin. In an autobiography written by Lukoyanov in 1942, he discusses his role in the organization of the execution of the royal family by the Ural Soviet. On the eve of the assassinations, he suddenly and unexpectedly left for Perm, reportedly to transfer the Cheka archives. After the seizure of Yekaterinburg by the Czechoslovaks on July 25, 1918, the Ural Regional Cheka was evacuated to Perm. At the same time, he was a member of the editorial board of Izvestia of the Perm Provincial Committee. Some party comrades criticized Lukoyanov for ordering the executions of workers from the Motovilikha Plants.

After the capture of Perm by the Russian army in December 1918, he collaborated in the Vyatka Izvestia. Soon after, in 1919, Lukoyanov suffered a severe nervous breakdown, which allegedly continued to severely affect him for the rest of his life.

After the retreat of the Whites, he worked in the Perm Provincial Committee and in the newspaper Zvezda (Star), formerly the Proletarian Banner, which he created and edited. Later he worked as a journalist in the magazines "Yugo-Vostok" and "Red Print". In the 1930s, Lukoyanov worked in Moscow: from 1932 in the People's Commissariat of Finance, from 1934 in the editorial office of Izvestia, from 1937 in the Commissariat of Blanks. He assisted in the supervision of the development of the Second Five-Year Plan in the RSFSR.

In 1940, Mikhail Lukoyanov was arrested by the NKVD and died in prison shortly after; his brother could do nothing to save him. The younger Fyodor Lukoyanov died seven years later – he died in 1947 in a Moscow mental sanatorium, incidentally on the eve of the anniversary of the Ipatiev murders. His wife arranged the transportation of the ashes to Perm and soon died as well. Fyodor Nikolaevich was buried at the Yegoshikha Cemetery in Perm, next to his wife. On October 4, 2007, the monument at the grave of F.N. Lukoyanov was controversially reconstructed. The grave is subject to regular acts of vandalism.
