= Stepan Vaganov =

Russian Bolshevik revolutionary

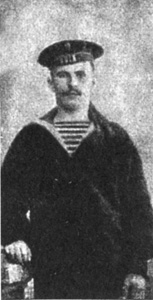
- Born: 1886; Yekaterinburgsky Uyezd, Perm Governorate, Russian Empire
- Died: 1918 (aged 31–32) Yekaterinburg, Provisional Ural Government
- Allegiance: Russian Empire; Russian SFSR
- Branch: (Russian Empire) Imperial Russian Navy (Russian Soviet Federative Socialist Republic) Red Army
- Service years: 1910–1918
- Conflicts: World War I; Russian Civil War; Eastern Front

Stepan Vaganov (Russian: Степан Ваганов; 1886–1918) was a Russian sailor and Bolshevik revolutionary. A participant in the establishment of Soviet power in the Urals and in the civil war, he is known for his personal participation in the murder of the Romanov family under Yakov Yurovsky on 17 July 1918.

== Biography ==
=== Early life and military service ===
Stepan Vaganov was born in 1886 near the Verkh-Isetsky Metallurgical Plant, in a working-class family. He was brought up in an Orthodox family and finished education at the parish school and got a job as a locksmith. In 1907, Vaganov was married to a resident of his village, Olga Ivanovna. The wedding took place in the Church of the Nativity of Christ of the same faith. After the wedding, the young couple lived in the parental home of the Vaganovs, where they had seven children in seven years.

In 1910 he was called up for military service, graduated from the Mineman School for lower ranks in Kronstadt, and served on the 2nd rank cruiser Asia. With the outbreak of the First World War, he was transferred to the mine layer Ladoga. He was noted in reports for his courage in naval combat. In 1915 he joined the RSDLP (b) and already in 1916 was first arrested for an attempt to smuggle the issue of the newspaper "Proletarian Voice" of the Petrograd Committee of the RSDLP (b) onto the ship. He was sentenced to six months and served his sentence in the Revel Coastal Prison.

=== The executions ===
After the Russian Revolution Vaganov joined the Red Guard, which were later incorporated as the first units of the Red Army following the outbreak of the Russian Civil War in 1918. He returned to his native Yekaterinburg and soon rose to become the right-hand man of Peter Ermakov, the military commissar of the 4th District of the Red Army Reserve in Yekaterinburg. In this position, Ermakov had in his direct subordination a special detachment of the Red Guards consisting of 19 men, the head of which was Vaganov. In June 1918, Vaganov took part in the suppression Verkh-Isetsk uprising under Ermakov's command. During this period he was actively involved in repression against the entrepreneurs and the workers alike in Yekaterinburg, the activity of which included expropriations and executions.

On 16 July Ermakov was elected by the members of the Ural Regional Soviet as a representative of the Red Army for the secret burial of the members of the Imperial Family. Vaganov arrived along with Ermakov and Filipp Goloshchekin to the Ipatiev House, where the commandant Yurovsky was waiting, and both Ermakov and Vaganov personally participated in the executions under Yurovsky. By all accounts, Vaganov along with Ermakov were the most bloodthirsty and aggressive of the executioners. According to various reports, the two were among many of the men in the firing squad who repeatedly shot the already dead former Tsar. In an interview he gave later in life, Ermakov recalled the massacre, stating: "Vaganov dealt with the princesses, they lay in a heap on the floor and groaned, dying ... Vaganov continued to shoot at Olga and Tatiana". Vaganov reportedly killed the maid of the empress, Anna Demidova, who survived the initial volley after the three male servants were killed. Crying, she attempted to defend herself, but was stabbed to death with a bayonet. Ermakov, continuing, casually recalled: "I don't think any of us hit the maid. She sank to the floor, hiding in the pillows. One of the guards, Vaganov, later pierced her throat with a bayonet".

After the killings, Vaganov accompanied Yurovsky, Ermakov, Kudrin and Goloshchekin to dispose of the remains, but Vaganov and the rest of Ermakov's men, excluding Ermakov himself, were dismissed and ordered back to the city, as Yurovsky did not trust them and was displeased with their drunkenness, following several failed attempts by some of Ermakov's men at looting and necrophilia.

=== Death ===
Over the next few days, the Bolsheviks hastily evacuated from Yekaterinburg ahead of the advance of the White-aligned Czechoslovak Legion. Though a number of Bolsheviks remained in the city when the Czechoslovaks finally arrived, almost all of those involved in the killing of the Imperial Family had already fled. A notable exception was Vaganov, who was unable to escape in time and found himself trapped in the city when it was taken by the White Czechs under Colonel Voytsekhovsky on 25 July. Likely anticipating brutal retribution at the hands of the White Guards, Vaganov tried to hide in a cellar, where he was found, not by the Whites, but by the workers of Verkh-Isetsk, who tore him to pieces on the spot in retribution for his earlier role in the suppression of the Verkh-Isetsk uprising and punitive raids and expropriations. Historian Helen Rappaport writes: "Stepan Vaganov fell victim to summary peasant justice: he was set upon and murdered, not for his part in the Romanov killings, but for his participation in local acts of brutal repression by the Cheka".

Vaganov's death, as well as his role in the regicide, was fully investigated by Nikolai Sokolov's commission established after the Whites came to power in Yekaterinburg. "The beauty and pride of the revolution", wrote Sokolov, "did not have time to escape from Yekaterinburg". Nonetheless, Sokolov and the White investigators regretted his untimely demise and the fact he could not be taken alive, as they knew very well he could have been a great wealth of information if captured and interrogated. Vaganov holds the distinction of being the first individual associated with the killing of the Imperial Family to die. He would be followed in death the following year by fellow executioner Pavel Medvedev, who was arrested by the Whites in 1919, and the member of the Ural Regional Council Nikolay Tolmachyov, who shot himself during a battle with the White Guard to avoid being made prisoner.

== In popular culture ==
The main antagonist of the 2017 musical Anastasia, based on the 1997 film of the same name is a Bolshevik general named Gleb Vaganov, who is depicted as the son of Stepan Vaganov. Gleb is tasked by his superiors with completing his father's legacy and assassinating Anastasia, but ultimately realizes, unlike his father, he does not have it in him to commit cold-blooded murder and relents, allowing Anastasia to escape and telling the press there "never was an Anastasia". The character of Gleb was invented for the musical to replace the supernatural Rasputin, who is ahistorically depicted as being behind the family's murder in the original 1997 animated film. None of the real Stepan Vaganov's children were known to be named Gleb. It is believed that when Ahrens and Flaherty decided to make the villain of the musical adaptation the son of Stepan Vaganov, they were unable to find the names of his children, so they looked at a list of popular Russian male names and they picked Gleb.
