= Pavel Spiridonovich Medvedev =

Russian Bolshevik revolutionary

Pavel Medvedev
- Born: 1888; Sysert, Perm Governorate, Russian Empire
- Died: 12 March 1919 (aged 30–31); Yekaterinburg, Russian State
- Military career
- Allegiance: Russian Empire; Russian SFSR
- Branch: Imperial Russian Army; Red Army
- Conflicts: World War I Russian Civil War

Pavel Spiridonovich Medvedev (Russian: Павел Спиридонович Медведев; 1888 – 12 March 1919) was a Bolshevik revolutionary, head of the external guard of the Ipatiev House in Yekaterinburg, a direct participant in the murder of the Romanov family on the night of 17 July 1918.

== Biography ==
Medvedev was born in 1888 in Sysert, part of the Perm Governorate. He worked at the Sysert plant prior to the First World War. During World War I, he joined the Imperial Russian Army and went to fight at the front, and rose to the rank of non-commissioned officer. In 1917, he became a member of the Russian Communist Party (Bolshevik), and subsequently participated in the suppression of the anti-Soviet uprising of Ataman Alexander Dutov.

=== Execution of the Romanovs ===
By the time that the former Emperor Nicholas II, his family, and their retinue were transferred to Yekaterinburg and handed over to the Ural Soviet on the prior suggestion of Filipp Goloshchekin, Medvedev was serving in the city as part of the local Red Guard. Medvedev headed the external security of the "House of Special Purpose" from the moment the imperial family arrived in Yekaterinburg, on April 30, 1918, until their execution. It was he who informed the local Chekists about the drunkenness and disobedience of the internal guards who reigned under the first commandant of the Ipatiev House, a locksmith named Alexander Avdeev. After that, Avdeev was removed by the Ural Soviet, and replaced by the Chekist Yakov Yurovsky, who established strict procedures. Medvedev worked closely with Yurovsky during the family's incarceration.

On the night of July 17, 1918, Medvedev, along with Yurovsky and several other Chekists and Red Army soldiers, was a direct participant in the execution of the imperial family. Medvedev's external guard, who did not take part in the shooting and were disarmed by Medvedev and Yurovsky shortly prior to the executions, out of fear they might have sympathized with the family, were employed as stretcher-bearers to transport the corpses from the basement to the truck outside where Goloshchekin was waiting. After the execution, when Yurovsky and Peter Ermakov left with Goloshchekin to bury the corpses at Ganina Yama, Medvedev organized a full cleaning in the Ipatiev House to hide the traces of the murders.

=== Civil War and death ===
After the White Czechs took Yekaterinburg, eight days after the execution of the royal family, Medvedev along with the remnants of the Red Army detachments retreated to Perm, and in the winter of 1918 participated in the defense of the city. By orders of his commanders, he was supposed to blow up the bridge over the Kama River while retreating, but did not have time and was captured by the Whites as a prisoner of war.

In captivity, he hid his identity, introduced himself by the name Bobylev, was soon released and worked as an orderly in a hospital, where he soon confessed to a sister of mercy that he has served in the guard of the Ipatiev House. The sister reported this to the authorities and on February 11, 1919, Medvedev was arrested in Perm by the criminal investigation agent S.I. Alekseev.

Medvedev was interrogated by the White Guard investigators who were investigating the murder of the imperial family on behalf of the local governor, Mikhail Diterikhs. During interrogations, he denied his personal involvement in the execution, claiming that during the murder he was sent out into the street to find out if shots were heard outside. He was charged with "murder by prior conspiracy with other persons and the seizure of the property of the former Emperor Nicholas II, his wife Alexandra Feodorovna, the heir Alexei Nikolaevich and Grand Duchesses Olga, Maria, Tatyana, Anastasia, as well as the physician Dr. Botkin, the maid Anna Demidova, the cook Kharitonov and the footman Troupe", and was transferred to Yekaterinburg and scheduled to be personally interrogated by the investigator Nikolai Sokolov, a private investigator from the Omsk Regional Court who had recently been appointed to oversee the investigation. Ultimately, however, on March 12, 1919, Medvedev reportedly died of typhus in the Yekaterinburg Prison, apparently, as a result of the poor conditions in which he was being held. Medvedev's widow, however, insisted that he had been killed in custody by the White Guards.

== Notes ==
He was related to fellow executioner Mikhail Kudrin, who also shared the surname Medvedev.
