= Alexey Georgievich Kabanov =

Russian revolutionary (1890–1972)

Alexey Kabanov
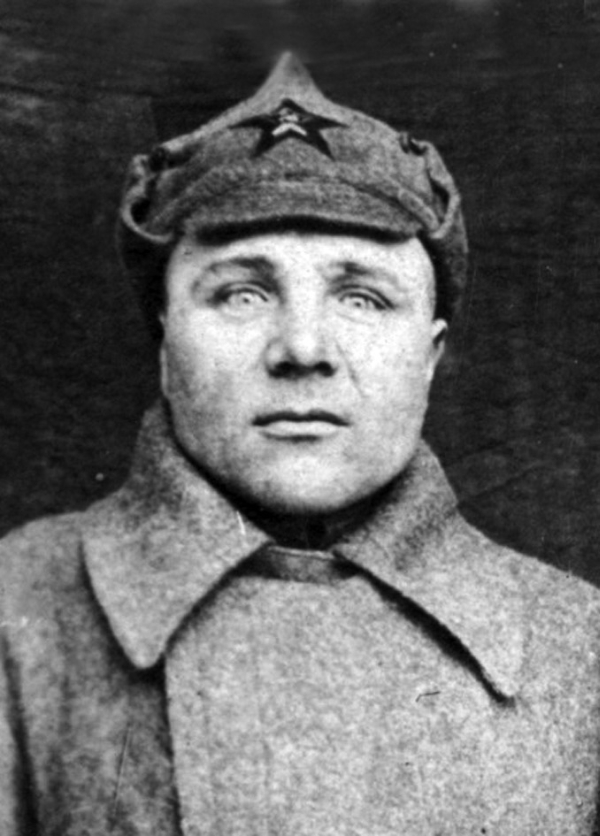
- Native name: Алексей Кабанов
- Born: 15 October 1890; Grimino, Rzhevsky Uyezd, Russian Empire
- Died: 1972 Moscow, Russian SFSR, Soviet Union
- Allegiance: Russian Empire; Russian SFSR; Soviet Union
- Branch: Russian Imperial Guard; Cheka
- Conflicts: Russian Civil War

Alexey Georgievich Kabanov (Алексей Георгиевич Кабанов; 15 October 1890–1972) was a Russian revolutionary, a former member of the Imperial Life Guard turned Bolshevik, member of the Cheka and a participant in the murder of the Romanov family.

== Biography ==
=== Early life ===
Kabanov was born in 1890 in the village of Grimino in Rzhevsky Uyezd, part of the Tver Governorate in the Russian Empire. From the peasant class, he worked as a shepherd, then a carpenter. After turning the age of majority, he moved to Saint Petersburg. At an unspecified point, he came to join the Imperial Life Guard and served in a cavalry regiment. After the Russian Revolution, he went over to the Bolsheviks.

=== In Yekaterinburg ===
Kabanov later came to work for the Ural Cheka, and after the members of the Imperial Family were brought to Yekaterinburg in the summer of 1918, was assigned to work at the Ipatiev House as the head of the attic machine gun team, who kept watch for possible attacks. The commandant of the "House of Special Purpose" Yakov Yurovsky had apparently selected Kabanov personally when he replaced Alexander Avdeev, who was removed by the order of the Ural Soviet due to lenient and lax behavior. Kabanov's brother, Mikhail Georgievich, was also a Bolshevik who served an important role in Yekaterinburg during its administration by the Ural Soviet as the head of the Yekaterinburg Prison.

One of the guards in the Ipatiev House, Yakimov, later told the White Russian investigator Sokolov of an encounter between Kabanov and the tsar during the family's incarceration, reporting: "Once, Kabanov was on duty at the inner courtyard post. Walking past Kabanov, the tsar took a good look at him and stopped. ‘You served in my cavalry regiment?’ Kabanov replied in the affirmative." According to E.S. Radzinsky, this “recognition” by the tsar may have contributed towards Kabanov's direct involvement regarding the family's earthly fate, being regarded, either by Yurovsky or even by Kabanov himself, as the only way to prove his loyalty to the new regime.

During the night of 17 July Kabanov participated in the executions, though he only stayed long enough to fire several shots at the “convicts” before retreating to the attic to man the machine gun turret. By his own recollection: "At this time, I also discharged my revolver at the convicts. I do not know the results of my shots, because I had to immediately go to the attic, to the machine gun, in case of an attack on us". Kabanov soon ran onto the street to check the noise levels and heard the dogs barking from the Romanovs' quarters and the sound of gunshots loud and clear. Kabanov then hurried downstairs and told the men to stop firing and use their gun butts and bayonets. Regarding the fate of the unfortunate animals, Kabanov later stated: "I also recommended the slaying of the three royal dogs". According to fellow conspirator Mikhail Medvedev-Kudrin, when the corpses were being loaded onto the fiat truck outside, the body of the French Bulldog Ortino, "the last pathetic remnant of the Imperial Family", was brought out on the end of a Red Guardsman's bayonet and unceremoniously hurled onto the fiat, Filipp Goloshchekin, the head of the military commissariat, contemptibly sneered, "Dogs deserve a dog's death", as he glared at the dead tsar.

=== After Yekaterinburg ===
After the massacre, he served for several more years as a Chekist, working in the organs of the Vyatka Cheka. After the end of the civil war, he held various party, legal and economic posts in the Crimea, in particular, he served as the prosecutor of the Feodosia District, and later in the Far East. In Khabarovsk, he was appointed manager of the Union Meat («Союзмясо») Far Eastern Office. At the beginning of the Second World War, he was in charge of the Khabarovsk Trust of Canteens.

In 1964, having learned from the newspapers about the death of Mikhail Medvedev-Kudrin and his high retirement status, he turned to the Khabarovsk Regional Committee with a request to also appoint him a personal pension, taking into account his own "revolutionary merits". Following the death of Medvedev-Kudrin, Kabanov and Grigory Nikulin were the last two surviving executioners. With the death of Nikulin less than two years later in 1965, Kabanov became the last surviving regicide. Following a radio interview by Nikulin shortly prior to his death, Kabanov, who was present when the shooting began and the tsar was killed, affirmed to Medvedev-Kudrin's son what Nikulin had told him: "The fact that the Tsar died from your father's bullet was something every worker in the Ural Cheka knew at the time". This was in direct contradiction to the report and the memoirs of Yurovsky, who always claimed he had personally killed the tsar before the other executioners had a chance to open fire. Regarding these claims, historian Helen Rappaport wrote "Whether that was true or not we shall never know", continuing "What really happened that night at the Ipatiev House was, from the very first, distorted by a systemic web of official lies, confusion, poor memory and disinformation".

Kabanov died in 1972 at the age of 81 as a pensioner of republican significance, the last surviving participant in either the organization or the execution of the killing of the Imperial Family. The Ipatiev House itself was demolished only five years later in 1977 by order of the Politburo as not of "sufficient historical significance". In 1993 after the dissolution of the Soviet Union a criminal case was opened by the Russian government but was subsequently closed on the basis that all of the perpetrators were "long dead".
