= Filipp Goloshchyokin =

Bolshevik revolutionary and Soviet politician (1876–1941)

- Филипп Голощёкин
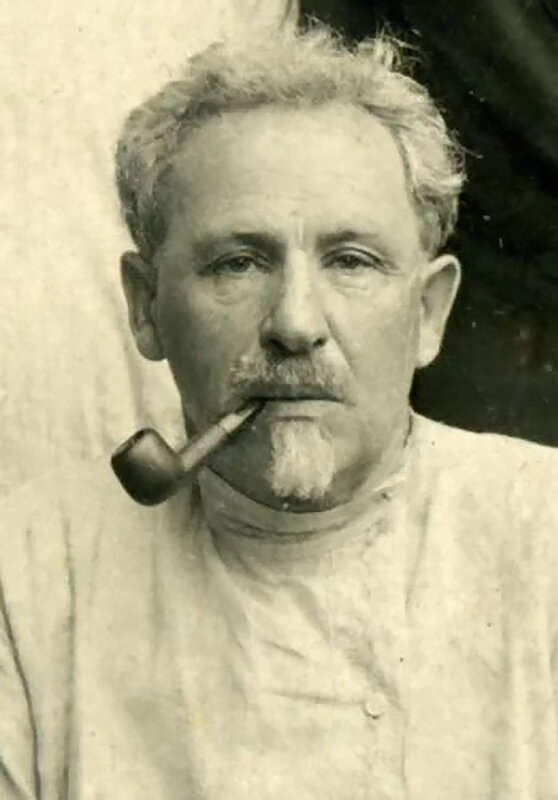

Chief State Arbiter of the Council of People's Commissars of the Soviet Union
- In office 12 September 1933 – 15 October 1939
- Preceded by: Vasily Schmidt
- Succeeded by: Vsevolod Mozheiko

First Secretary of the Kazakh Regional Committee of the All-Union Communist Party
- In office 19 February 1925 – 12 September 1933
- Preceded by: Viktor Naneishvili
- Succeeded by: Levon Mirzoyan

Full Member of the Central Committee of the 15th and 16th Party Congresses
- In office 19 December 1927 – 10 February 1934

Candidate Member of the Central Committee of the 13th and 14th Party Congresses
- In office 2 June 1924 – 19 December 1927

Personal details
- Born: Shaya Itsikovich Goloshchyokin; 9 March 1876 Nevel, Vitebsk Governorate, Russian Empire
- Died: 28 October 1941 (aged 65) Kuybyshev, Russian SFSR, Soviet Union
- Cause of death: Execution by firing squad
- Party: RSDLP (Bolsheviks) (1903–1918); Russian Communist Party (1918–1939)
- Spouses: Bertha Iosifovna Perelman; Elizaveta Arsenievna Goloshchyokina
- Known for: Kazakhstan famine of 1932–1933, Shooting of the Romanov Family, senior figure of the Communist Party of the Soviet Union

Filipp Isayevich Goloshchyokin, (Note: Russian: Филипп Исаевич Голощёкин, romanized: Filipp Isajevič Gološčjokin, pronounced [fʲɪˈlʲip ɪˈsajevʲɪtɕ gəlɐˈɕːɵkʲɪn]) born Shaya Itsikovich Goloshchyokin (Note: Russian: Шая Ицикович Голощёкин, romanized: Šaja Icikovič Gološčjokin, pronounced [ˈʂajə ɪˈtsɨkəvʲɪtɕ gəlɐˈɕːɵkʲɪn]) (March 9 [O.S. February 26] 1876 – October 28, 1941), was a Soviet Bolshevik revolutionary, politician, and apparatchik-party functionary.

A member of the Russian Social Democratic Labour Party since 1903 and a founding member of the Russian Communist Party (Bolsheviks), he was a participant in the Revolution of 1905 and the October Revolution. During the Russian Civil War he was a major figure in the establishment of Soviet power in the Urals and Siberia, acting as the People's Commissar for Military Affairs for the Ural Region, and a member of the Central Executive Committee of the Ural Regional Council of Workers', Peasants', and Soldiers' Deputies, more commonly known as the Ural Soviet, as well as a member of the Perm Central Executive Committee. He was one of the primary perpetrators in the murder of the Romanov family.

Following the establishment of the Soviet Union in 1922, in his capacity as a senior figure in the Communist Party, he was elected as a Full and Candidate Member of the Central Committee of the Communist Party of the Soviet Union from 1924 to 1934, First Secretary of the Kazakh Regional Committee of the All-Union Communist Party from 1925 to 1933, and Chief State Arbiter of the Council of People's Commissars of the USSR from 1933 to 1939. He played a deadly role in the Sovietization of Kazakhstan, (Small October), (Russian: Малый Октябрь, a reference to the "Great October"), leading to the Kazakh famine of 1932–1933, in which 1.5 million people died, of whom 1.3 million were ethnic Kazakhs. An estimated 25 to 42 percent of all Kazakhs died or emigrated, the highest percentage of any ethnic group killed by the Soviet famine of 1932–1933. Other sources state that as many as 1 to 2.3 million died.

An active participant in Stalinist repression during the Great Purge (1936–1938), he was arrested after the fall of Nikolai Yezhov in 1939, and later shot without trial by the NKVD in 1941. He was posthumously rehabilitated in 1961, 20 years after his death, after de-Stalinization.

== Early life and career ==
Born 9 March [O.S. 26 February] 1876 in Nevel to a family of Jewish contractors, his middle name has been spelt as, Isai (Yiddish: Shaya or Shai) and Isak, Isayevich, Isaakovich, Itskovich are indicated as real names. After graduating from a dental school in Riga, Goloshchyokin worked for a time as a dental technician.

In 1903 he joined the RSDLP. He conducted revolutionary work in St. Petersburg, Kronstadt, Sestroretsk, Moscow and other cities. He took part in the Revolution of 1905–1907. From 1909, he worked in the Moscow Committee of the RSDLP and directed it. In 1909 he was arrested and exiled to the Narym region, and fled in 1910.

In 1912, he was a delegate to the Bolshevik Congress in Prague, at which Vladimir Lenin formalized the break with the Mensheviks and created a separate Bolshevik organization with its own Central Committee, of which Goloshchyokin was a founding member. He assumed the alias Filipp, also transliterated Philipp or Philippe, as his party cryptonym.

In 1913 he was again arrested by the Russian authorities and deported to the Turukhansk Territory in Siberia, and released only after the February Revolution in 1917. In May, Yakov Sverdlov, the Chairman of the All-Russian Central Executive Committee, sent Goloshchyokin to the Ural Region, informing the local Bolsheviks: "Comrade Philippe has gone to the Urals; a man; very energetic; with the right party line". He served as a member of the Perm Committee of the All-Union Communist Party, then a member of the Regional Committee.

As a delegate to the Second All-Russian Congress of Soviets, Goloshchyokin arrived in Petrograd. He joined the Petrograd Military Revolutionary Committee and participated in the October Revolution. At the Second Congress of Soviets, he was elected a member of the All-Russian Central Executive Committee. Goloshchyokin recalled that before his departure for the Urals, Lenin aimed at delaying the convocation and the subsequent dispersal of the All-Russian Constituent Assembly.

After the success of the October Revolution and the outbreak of the Russian Civil War, he was elected to the Presidium of the Ural Regional Soviet, based in Ekaterinburg, and was elected Military Commissar of the Urals, where he formed and headed the Red Guard in the region and oversaw the activities of the Red Army Reserve District in Ekaterinburg. In Spring 1918, he proposed to execute Prince Georgy Lvov, who had served as Chairman of the Provisional Government after the February Revolution, and was a prisoner in Ekaterinburg, but was ordered not to by the People's Commissar for Justice, a Left Socialist Revolutionary, during the period when the Left SRs were in coalition with the Bolsheviks.

== Murder of the Romanovs ==
While he was in Moscow in the spring of 1918, Goloshchyokin decided to first suggest to Yakov Sverdlov that the former Emperor Nicholas II should be moved to Ekaterinburg, where there was less chance of his being rescued by the anti-Bolshevik White Army. Sverdlov and Lenin were reluctant to agree because they planned to put the former emperor on trial in a grand public spectacle, with Leon Trotsky acting as Chief Prosecutor, and they suspected that the militant Ekaterinburg Bolsheviks would lynch him instead, but ultimately agreed that the prisoner and his family should pass through Ekaterinburg on the way to Moscow.

Upon arrival in Ekaterinburg, the family and their retainers were imprisoned in the Ipatiev House on the suggestion of Pyotr Voykov, a member of the Ural Soviet, with Yakov Yurovsky, a ranking member of the Ekaterinburg Cheka, appointed as commandant of the Ipatiev House by the decision of the Soviet. Though Yurovsky held direct command on the grounds, overall command was ultimately held by Goloshchyokin as Military Commissar of the Ural Region. In this capacity, he frequently oversaw the dismissal of guardsmen believed too sympathetic to the family and their replacement with more hardened, ruthless Bolshevists. When one of the guards, Ivan Skorokhodov, who was smitten with the Grand Duchess Maria Nikolaevna, smuggled a birthday cake to the grand duchess for her 19th birthday and was caught fraternizing with the same, Goloshchyokin had him arrested and tightened security.

In a special session on 29 June the Ural Soviet met at the Cheka headquarters in the Amerikanskaya Hotel and agreed that the entire Romanov family should be executed. Goloshchyokin arrived in Moscow on 3 July with a message insisting on the tsar's death. Only seven of the 23 members of the Central Executive Committee were in attendance at the time, three of whom were Lenin, Sverdlov and Felix Dzerzhinsky, where it was seemingly agreed the tsar should be killed without delay, with the details and preparations being left to the discretion of the Ural Soviet.

Yurovsky detailed his interactions with Goloshchyokin in great detail in his memoirs, stating: “In about the middle of July, Filipp told me we had to make preparations for the liquidation in case the [White] front got any closer." On 15 or 16 July, Yurovsky was informed by the Ural Soviet that Red Army contingents were retreating in all directions, and the executions could not be delayed any longer. A coded telegram seeking final approval was sent by Goloshchyokin and Georgy Safarov at around 6:00 PM to Lenin and Sverdlov in Moscow, but the lines were down and they could not get a direct connection, leaving them with no choice but to send the telegram on the direct line to Petrograd instead addressed to Grigory Zinoviev, the head of the Petrograd Soviet, based in the Smolny Institute, with a request to forward a copy to Sverdlov in Moscow. Zinoviev duly forwarded the telegraph to Moscow, noting that he had done so by 5:50 PM Petrograd time. There is no surviving documented record of a final answer from Moscow, although Yurovsky insisted that an order from the Central Executive Committee to move forward signed by Sverdlov had been passed on to him by Goloshchyokin at around 7:00 PM.

While Beloborodov and Safarov remained at the local Cheka Headquarters at the Amerikanskaya Hotel nearby, Goloshchyokin arrived personally at the Ipatiev House along with Peter Ermakov and Stepan Vaganov as a representative of the Ural Soviet to direct the executions, but did not appear to physically participate in the shooting himself, and instead remained outside with the other guardsmen while Yurovsky personally led the assembled death squad.

Goloshchyokin is said to have nervously paced back and forth along the perimeter palisade erected around the Ipatiev House in an attempt to determine whether anyone could hear what was going on from outside as one of the guardsmen revved the engines of the fiat truck waiting outside to mask the sounds of the gunfire and barking dogs. When it was clear that the gunfire could be discerned even from outside the palisade walls, one of the guards, Alexei Kabanov, told the killers to cease fire and to use their bayonets and gun butts. As the corpses were brought out from the house and loaded onto the truck, Goloshchyokin stooped down to examine the corpse of the tsar, murmuring, "So this is the end of the Romanov Dynasty, is it...", to which Mikhail Kudrin responded: "No, not yet; there is still much work to be done". According to Kudrin, when the body of the French Bulldog Ortino, "the last pathetic remnant of the Imperial Family", was brought out on the end of a Red Guardsman's bayonet and unceremoniously hurled onto the fiat, Goloshchyokin sneered, "Dogs deserve a dogs death" as he glared at the dead tsar. Goloschyokin climbed into the truck and departed along with Yurovsky, Kudrin, Ermakov, and Vaganov, while Yurovsky's deputy Nikulin was left in charge of the Ipatiev House.

At a telegraph office in Ekaterinburg on 18 July, he caught Thomas Preston, a diplomat at the British Consulate, attempting to cable Sir Arthur Balfour in London with the message, "The Tsar Nicholas the Second was shot last night." Goloshchyokin snatched it, and struck out the words of Preston's text with a red pencil, rewriting on the paper, "The hangman Tsar Nicholas was shot last night – a fate he richly deserved."

On 19 July, Goloshchyokin announced at the Opera House on Glavny Prospekt that "Nicholas the Bloody" had been shot and his family taken to a secure location. He subsequently oversaw the disposal of the remains along with Yurovsky, while Beloborodov and Nikulin oversaw the ransacking of the Romanov's quarters, with the most valuable items piled into Yurovsky's office and later transported to Moscow in sealed trunks under heavy guard by commissars on Goloshchyokin's instructions, while items deemed of little consequence were stuffed into the stoves and burned. Goloshchyokin was safely evacuated from Ekaterinburg along with most of the other members of the Ural Soviet prior to the arrival of the White Army, who captured Ekaterinburg on 25 July.

== Famine in Kazakhstan ==
From October 1922 to 1925, Goloshchyokin served as Chairman of the Samara Provincial Council of Workers, Peasants and Red Army Deputies, Chairman of the Samara Gubernaya Executive Committee and a member of the Provincial Committee of the RCP. On October 23, 1922, he abolished martial law in the Samara Province. He was elected a Candidate Member of the Central Committee of the Communist Party of the Soviet Union in 1924, and a Full Member in 1927. On 19 February 1925, he was appointed First Secretary of the Communist Party in the newly created Kazakh Autonomous Socialist Soviet Republic.

From 1925 to 1933 he ran the Kazakh ASSR as a local dictator with virtually no outside interference. He played a prominent part in the construction of the Turkestan-Siberia railway, which was constructed to open up Kazakhstan's mineral wealth. After Joseph Stalin ordered the forced collectivization of agriculture throughout the Soviet Union, Goloshchyokin ordered that Kazakhstan's largely nomadic population was to be forced to settle in collective farms. This caused a deadly famine in Kazakhstan which killed between 1 and 2 million people.

Some historians and scholars contend that this famine amounted to genocide of the Kazakhs, however others do not accept this view. In Kazakhstan some studies repeated the Soviet explanation of the genocide, labeling it as the Goloshchyokin genocide. 38% of all Kazakhs died, the highest number of any ethnic group killed per capita in the Soviet famines of the early 1930s. Violent measures were taken to enable the transfer of nomads to sedentary lifestyles, which led to massive casualties, mainly among the indigenous Kazakh population. Large numbers of Kazakh nomads fled across the border into Xinjiang in the Republic of China during this time.

While a general figure of around 1–2 million deaths is often given, some Kazakh historians, such as Professor K.M. Abzhanov, Director of the Institute of History and Ethnology, give significantly higher estimates of the number of victims of the famine and violence: "Hunger killed at least 3 million Kazakhs. One-sixth of the indigenous population left their historical homeland forever. Of 3.5 million Kazakhs in 1897 accounting for 82% of the region's population, by 1939 there were only 2.3 million, their share in the population of the republic fell to 38%". Two Soviet censuses show that the number of the Kazakhs in the Kazakh ASSR dropped from 3,637,612 in 1926 to 2,181,520 in 1937. The actions of the Soviet government made Kazakhs a minority in the Kazakh ASSR, and not until the 1990s did Kazakhs become the largest group in Kazakhstan again.

A historian of the revolution, V.L. Burtsev, who knew Goloshchyokin, characterized him as such:

This is a typical Leninist. This is a man who does not stop the blood. This trait is especially noticeable in his nature: the executioner, cruel, with some elements of degeneration. In party life he was arrogant, was a demagogue, a cynic. He did not count the Kazakhs as people at all. Goloshchekin did not have time to appear in Kazakhstan, as he stated that there is no Soviet power, and it is "necessary" to orchestrate a "Small October".

Statements that, in seven years, he never went outside the capital and was not interested in how the people lived, did not correspond to reality. In April 1931, for example, Goloshchyokin toured ten raions of the republic. Nonetheless, the handling of collectivization and "dekulakization" under his leadership in Kazakhstan is remembered by a feeling of hatred and horror by the Kazakh people.

== Downfall ==
In August 1932, the second most senior communist in Kazakhstan, the Chairman of the Council of People's Commissars, Uraz Isayev, wrote to Stalin accusing Goloshchyokin of believing his own myth that every single Kazakh had decided to join the collective farms, and of blaming his own mistakes on 'kulaks'. In October, a prominent Kazakh writer, Gabit Musirepov reporting finding corpses stacked like firewood by the roadside in the Turgai district of Kazakhstan. The West Siberian party boss, Robert Eikhe, also complained about starving Kazakhs pouring into Siberia, while Stalin and Vyacheslav Molotov queried the number of Kazakh refuges crossing the border into China.

Goloshchyokin defended himself by claiming that the poor and middle income Kazakhs had "Voluntarily, in powerful waves, turned towards socialism". At first it appeared he had Stalin's support. On 11 November 1932, he and Isaev ordered the mass arrest and deportation of peasants accused of impeding grain collection. In January 1933, at a plenum of the Central Committee, he boasted of the "enormous successes" of the Five year Plan in Kazakhstan – but a few days later, he was suddenly sacked, and was subject to widespread public criticism for his handling of collectivization. By blaming the famine on Goloshchyokin personally rather than larger structural issues with collectivization, Stalin failed to prevent similar problems during collectivization in the Ukrainian Soviet Socialist Republic that would lead to the Holodomor.

After his return to Moscow, despite being appointed to a senior post as President of the State Council of Arbitration, Goloshchyokin brooded over his dismissal, and threatened suicide until his exasperated wife, Elizaveta Arsenievna Goloshchyokina, handed him a pistol and dared him to shoot himself – after which he reputedly never threatened suicide again. Throughout his term as Chief State Arbiter of the Council of People's Commissars, he was an active participant in Stalinist repression, and was a frequent contact and collaborator of Nikolai Yezhov, the head of the NKVD from 1936 to 1938 during the most active period of the Great Purge.

== Arrest and execution ==
Unlike most prominent Old Bolsheviks, he survived the Great Purge unscathed for as long as Nikolai Yezhov was the head of the NKVD; but when Yezhov was arrested in 1939, he made a detailed confession to his interrogators, including the information that he had lived in Goloshchyokin's apartment in Kzyl-Orda, then the capital of the Kazakh ASSR, in the latter half of 1925, and that during those months, they were homosexual lovers. Homosexuality was not a criminal offense in the USSR in 1925, though it was criminalized in 1934, but Goloshchyokin, who was almost 20 years older than Yezhov, was arrested nonetheless on 15 October 1939.

He was accused of sympathy for Trotskyism, the preparation of a terrorist act, excesses in the matter of collectivization, and of spying for Nazi Germany. He spent 12 months under heavy interrogation in the Sukhanovo Prison, after which he was returned to Butyrka prison by August 1941 at the time of the Axis invasion of the Soviet Union during World War II, and was then transferred a final time to Kuybyshev by 17 October, when the headquarters of the NKVD were evacuated there in connection with the approach of the Wehrmacht towards Moscow. He was one of 20 'especially dangerous' prisoners, who included 14 high-ranking military officers, who were executed by firing squad on 28 October 1941 on the direct orders of Lavrentiy Beria near the village of Barbysh and consigned to an unmarked grave.

He was posthumously rehabilitated in 1961, 20 years after his death. From 1976 to 1990, one of the streets in Ekaterinburg, then known as Sverdlovsk, was named after Goloshchyokin.

== Name ==
The surname is often written as "Goloshchekin", a transliteration of the surname written without diacritics: Голощeкин.

He is also often referred to as Shaya Goloshchekin (Шая) by the diminutive from the name Isay in Yiddish. "Filipp" was his party cryptonym.

== Family ==
His first wife, Bertha Iosifovna Perelman, was born in 1876 to the family of an artisan. She was arrested and sent into exile in the Narym region. In exile Bertha Perelman married Goloshchyokin. She died in 1918.

He subsequently married Elizaveta Arsenievna Goloshchyokina.

== In popular culture ==
Goloshchyokin was portrayed by Lithuanian actor Jokūbas Bareikis in the 2019 American docudrama The Last Czars, and by Russian actor Sergei Nikonenko in the 2021 Kazakh film The Crying Steppe.

== See also ==
- Outline of the Russian Revolution and Civil War
- Bibliography of the Russian Revolution and Civil War
- Bibliography of Stalinism and the Soviet Union
- Index of Old Bolsheviks
- Index of articles related to the Russian Revolution and Civil War
