= The Crying Steppe =

2020 film

- Directed by: Marina Kunarova
- Starring: Dulyga Akmolda
- Release date: 6 November 2020 (Asian World Film Festival)
- Running time: 137 minutes
- Country: Kazakhstan
- Language: Kazakh

The Crying Steppe is a 2020 Kazakhstani drama film directed by Marina Kunarova. It was selected as the Kazakhstani entry for the Best International Feature Film at the 93rd Academy Awards, but it was not nominated.

== Synopsis ==
The film is based on true events during the famines of the 1920s and 1930s in Kazakhstan.

== Cast ==
- Akylkhan Almassov as Turar
- Sayazhan Kulymbetova as Nuria
- Dulyga Akmolda as Maden
- Adilet Zhangali as Iliyas
- Rayana Daulet as Aikynum
- Sergey Ufimtzev as Yermakov
- Safuan Shaimerdenov as Zhanibekov
- Roman Zhukov as Shilov
- Sagat Zhylgheldiyev as Omar Ata
- Aibar Tangyt as Alikhan
- Aygerim Zhunisova as Mariyam
- Balzhan Ospanbay as Bates
- Nurseyt Otkir as Magzhan
- Nurislam Sovet as Saken
- Meirlan Suleimenov as Sharniyaz
- Kulpash Malikova as Garipa
- Didar Kaden as Dosatay
- Nurzhan Abilasan as Kamil
- Denis Shevelov as Yurovsky
- Sergey Nikonenko as Goloshchyokin
- Ilya Bobkov as Tsar
- Gleb Smolkov as Alexei
- Irina Petrovna as Olga
- Elena Shmatkova as Tatiana
- Olesya Pigareva as Maria
- Ksenia Synkova as Anastasia

== See also ==
- List of submissions to the 93rd Academy Awards for Best International Feature Film
- List of Kazakhstani submissions for the Academy Award for Best International Feature Film
