= Ipatiev House =

House where the Romanovs were imprisoned

Coordinates: 56°50′39″N 60°36′35″E

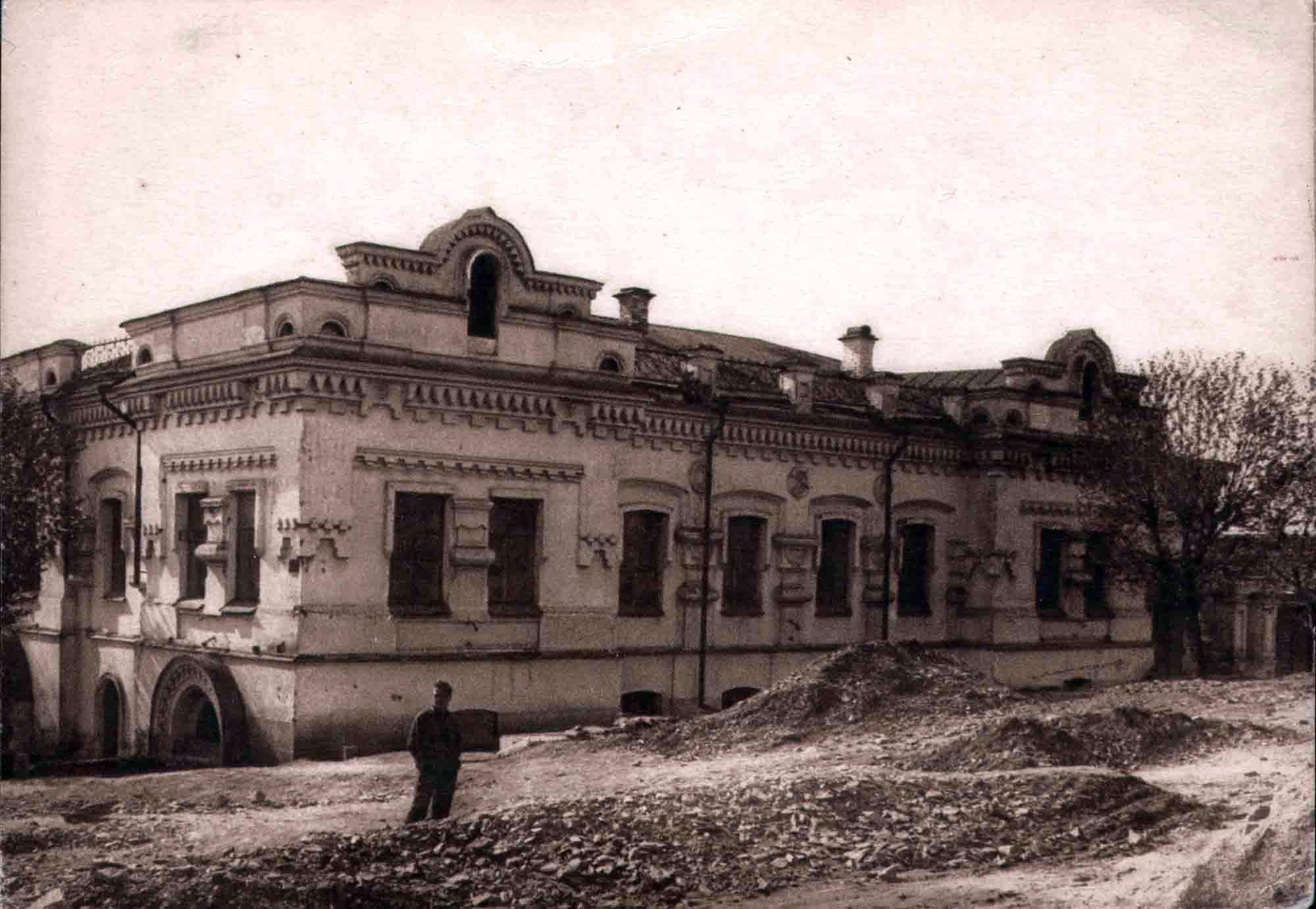
Ipatiev House, Yekaterinburg (city later renamed Sverdlovsk)

Ipatiev House (Russian: Дóм Ипáтьева) was a merchant's house in Yekaterinburg (then Sverdlovsk from 1924 to 1991) where the abdicated Nicholas II (1868–1918, reigned 1894–1917), all his immediate family, and other house members were executed in July 1918 following the October Revolution.

By chance, from 1908 the house's name was identical with that of the Ipatiev Monastery in Kostroma, where the Romanov dynasty had come to the throne. In 1977, on the 60th anniversary of the Russian Revolution, the Ipatiev house was demolished by order of the Politburo to the local Soviet government, almost 59 years after the Romanov family murder and 14 years before the dissolution of the Soviet Union.

== History ==
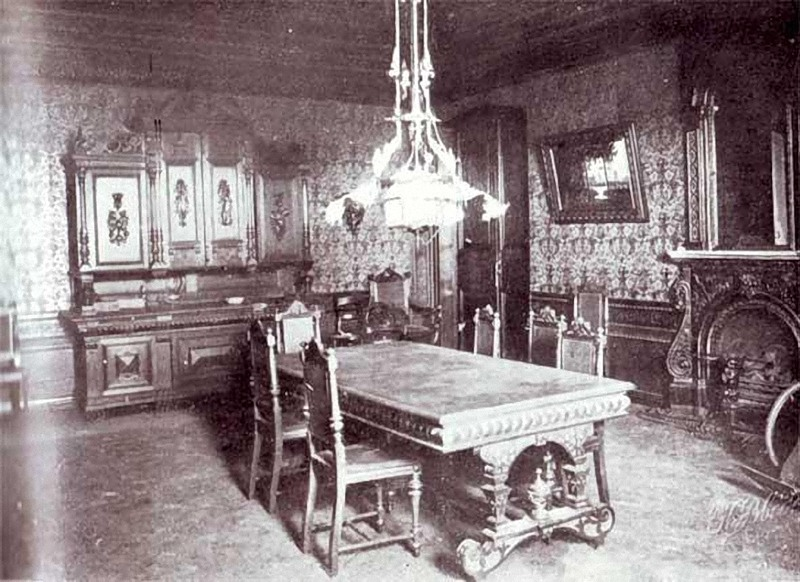
Dining room. In 1918 the door led to the grand duchesses' room.

In the 1880s, Ivan Redikortsev, an official involved in the mining industry, commissioned a two-story house to be built on the slope of a prominent hill. The length of the facade was 31 metres. In 1898, the mansion passed to Sharaviev, a gold dealer of tainted reputation. Ten years later, the house was acquired by Nikolai Nikolayevich Ipatiev, a military engineer, who turned the ground floor into his office.

It seems to have been on the basis of information supplied by Pyotr Voykov that Ipatiev was summoned to the office of the Ural Soviet at the end of April 1918 and ordered to vacate what was soon to be called "The House of Special Purpose."

=== The Imperial family's stay and on-site massacre ===
The Imperial Romanov family moved in on 30 April 1918 and spent 78 days at the house. This household included Tsar Nicholas Romanov, his wife, the Tsarina Alexandra Fyodorovna of Hesse, their four daughters, their son and heir Alexei, the Tsarevich (crown prince); their court physician Dr. Yevgeny Botkin, chambermaid Anna Demidova, cook Ivan Kharitonov, and valet Alexei Trupp. They occupied four rooms on the upper story of the Ipatiev House, while their guards were housed on the ground floor. From early July, command of this guard was taken over by Yakov Yurovsky, a senior member of the Ural Soviet.

The prisoners were permitted brief daily exercise in an enclosed garden. However, the windows to their rooms were painted over and they were kept in isolation from the outside. A high wooden fence was built around the outer perimeter of the house, closing it off from the street.

About midnight on 16–17 July 1918, Commander Yurovsky entered the second-floor room of Dr. Botkin, who was awake and writing a letter. Botkin was told to awaken the Imperial family and their three remaining servants, so that the whole party could be evacuated from Yekaterinburg. The reason given was that the anti-Bolshevik White Army forces of Tsarist and moderate democratic socialists in the ensuing Russian Civil War of 1918–1921, were nearing the city and that there had been firing in the streets.

After taking about half an hour to dress and pack, the Romanovs, Botkin and the three servants were led down a flight of stairs into the courtyard of the house, and from there through a ground-floor entrance to a small semi-basement room at the back of the building. Chairs were brought for Tsarevich Alexei and Tsarina Alexandra at the Tsar's request. The remainder of the party stood behind and to one side of the seated pair.

After a while, Yurovsky and a party of armed men entered the basement room through the double doors. Ivan Plotnikov, history professor at the Maksim Gorky Ural State University, has established that the executioners were Yakov Yurovsky, G. P. Nikulin, M. A. Medvedev (Kudrin), Peter Ermakov, Stepan Vaganov, Alexey Georgievich Kabanov, P. S. Medvedev, V. N. Netrebin, and Y. M. Tselms. Three Latvians refused at the last minute to take part in the execution.

Yurovsky spoke briefly to the effect that their Romanov relatives had attempted to save the Imperial family, that this attempt had failed and that the Soviets were now obliged to shoot them all. He and his squad then opened fire with pistols on the prisoners.

The number of people crowded into a comparatively small area led to an inefficient and messy slaughter. It took between twenty and thirty minutes before all were killed.

=== Demolition ===
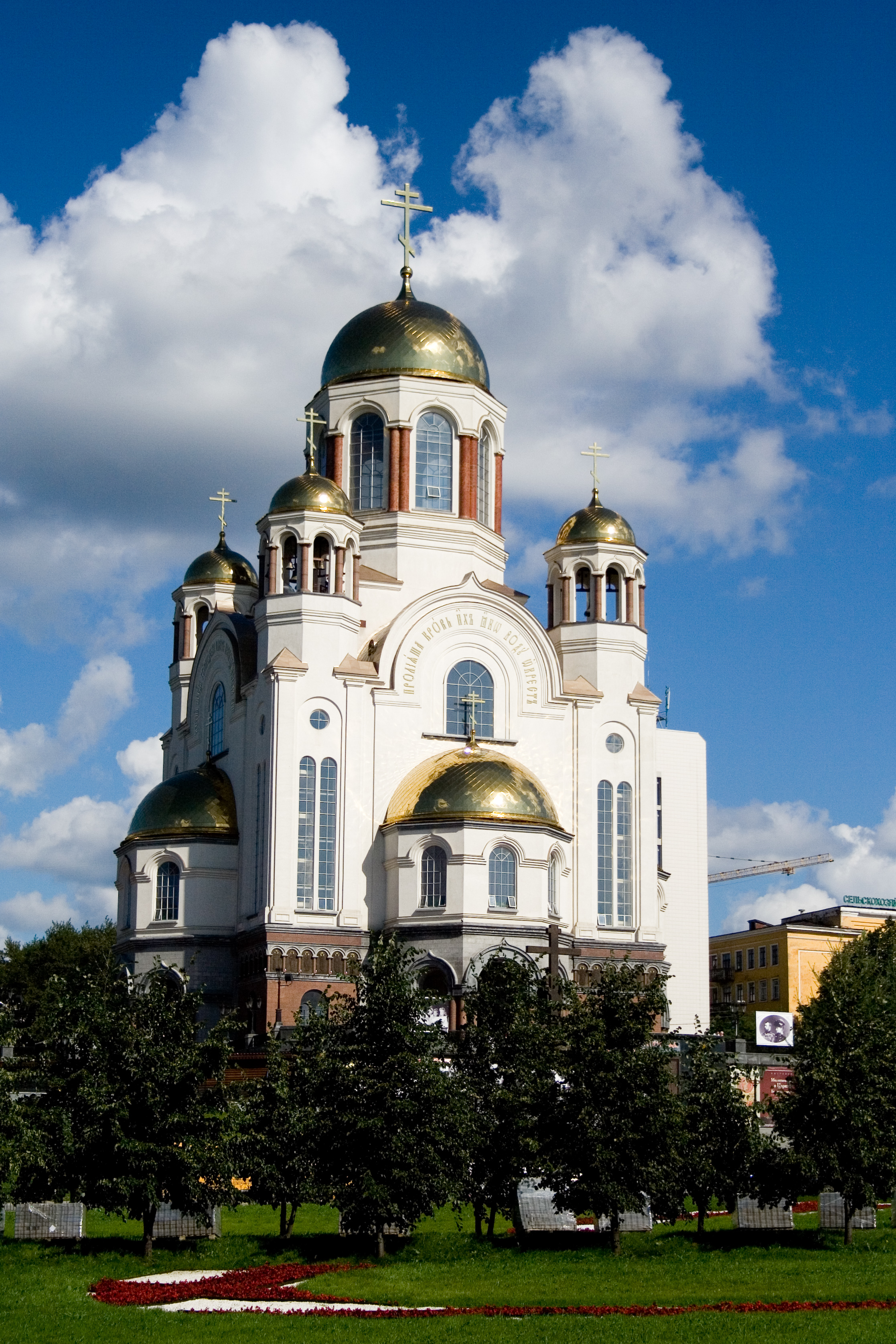
Yekaterinburg's Church on the Blood, built on the spot where the Ipatiev House once stood.

As early as 1923, the photographs of the fenced house were disseminated in the Soviet press under the label of "the last palace of the last Tsar". In 1927, the house was designated a branch of the Ural Revolution Museum. It then became an agricultural school before taking on new life in 1938 as an anti-religious museum. During this period it was customary for party apparatchiks to arrive in large tour groups, posing before the bullet-damaged wall of the cellar in which the former Tsar and his family had been executed. In 1946, it was taken over by the local Communist Party. In 1974, it was formally listed as a Historical-Revolutionary Monument. However, it was steadily becoming a place of pilgrimage for those who wished to honour the memory of the imperial family.

In 1977, as the sixtieth anniversary of the Russian Revolution approached, the Politburo decided to take action, declaring that the house was not of "sufficient historical significance", and ordering its demolition. The task was passed to Boris Yeltsin, chair of the local party, who had the house demolished in September 1977. He later wrote in his memoirs, published in 1990, that "sooner or later we will be ashamed of this piece of barbarism." However, despite this action, the pilgrims kept coming, often in secret and at night, leaving tokens of remembrance on the vacant site. After the dissolution of the Soviet Union in 1991, Church on the Blood, one of the largest church complexes in Russia, was built on the site.

== The Romanov crosses ==
On one side of the church, there is an Orthodox cross which marks the location of the Romanov family’s death. Even during the Soviet era, there were crosses placed in that area, which changed over time. Different crosses would be replaced by new ones as the years went by. A small wooden structure was eventually built behind the cross and still stands near the church today.

Another cross stands near the wooden structure, showing the spot where the executions occurred.

== In literature and drama ==
The house features as the setting for three plays: Ekaterinburg (David Logan, 2013) the title being an alternate romanization of Yekaterinburg, OTMA (Kate Moira Ryan, 2006) and The House of Special Purpose (Heidi Thomas, 2009). All three plays deal with the time in captivity spent inside the Ipatiev House by the Romanovs and their retainers.

The house is featured in the episode "Ipatiev House" in season 5 of The Crown, covering the execution of the Romanovs.

== See also ==
- Ganina Yama – Mine where the bodies were disposed
