= Mikhail Medvedev-Kudrin =

Russian revolutionary (1891–1964)

- Born: 30 September 1891; Dedyukhino, Sarapulsky Uyezd, Vyatka Governorate, Russian Empire
- Died: 13 January 1964 (aged 72); Moscow, Russian SFSR, Soviet Union
- Military career
- Allegiance: Russian SFSR; Soviet Union
- Branch: Cheka; NKVD
- Service years: 1917 - 1951
- Rank: (Soviet Union) Polkovnik (NKVD)
- Conflicts: Russian Civil War

Mikhail Aleksandrovich Medvedev (Kudrin) (September 30, 1891 – January 13, 1964) was a Russian revolutionary, Chekist, direct participant in the murder of the Romanov family in the Ipatiev House in Yekaterinburg on the night of July 17, 1918.

== Biography ==
Mikhail Kudrin was born in the village of Dedyukhino in the Sarapul District, into a Russian peasant family. In 1900 he graduated from the parish school in the village of Izgar, and from 1900 to 1908 he lived in Chistopol, where he began to study at the school of artisan students, but after the second grade he was forced to leave school due to the difficult financial situation of the family.

In 1908, Kudrin moved to Perm, where he worked at a power plant, then as a locksmith at an oil warehouse, and finally as an oiler on a tugboat. In September 1911, he left for Baku, where he got a job in the engine crew of a tanker in the Caspian Sea and joined the "Union of Non-Industrial Workers" and met the Bolsheviks. In the summer of 1912, Kudrin joined the RSDLP and plunged headfirst into party work. In 1912, he became a member of the illegal Bolshevik "Trade Union of Seamen of the Caspian Merchant Fleet". In February 1914, Kudrin was arrested, along with a group of Baku Bolsheviks, and until September 1916 was held in a Baku prison. After having freed himself, he received a passport from the Bolshevik underground in the name of "Mikhail Sidorov", went into hiding, and returned to Perm.

In the summer of 1917 following the February Revolution, Medvedev, at the invitation of an old acquaintance from the Baku underground, came to Yekaterinburg and got a job at a power plant. After the creation of the local soviet at the plant, he became its secretary, and later, was elected its chairman.

=== Execution of the Romanovs ===
In 1918, Medvedev became a member of the collegium of the Ural Regional Cheka in Yekaterinburg. In early July 1918, he was assigned to the internal security of the House of Special Purpose in Yekaterinburg, and on the night of July 17 he participated in the execution of the royal family.

According to Medvedev's own recollections, it was he who first started shooting and killed the Tsar. According to his testimony, when the commandant Yakov Yurovsky told the condemned that they would be shot, they did not expect such words, and Dr. Botkin asked: “So they won't take us anywhere?” Then, without waiting for the commandant to repeat the verdict of the Ural Soviet, he began shooting and released a hail of five bullets. After Medvedev opened fire, the rest of the executioners began to shoot. Grigory Nikulin, who also participated in the execution, later agreed that the Tsar was killed precisely by Medvedev's shots. This was contested, however, by Yurovsky's own report and memoirs, who, describing the killings, testified he had opened fire first and had fatally shot the Tsar. Peter Ermakov, one of the other shooters, alternatively claimed at different points in various accounts that either he, or Yurovsky, had killed Nicholas, but did not mention Medvedev. According to Helen Rappaport, and Greg King and Penny Wilson, all of the Romanovs were fatally shot by either Yurovsky or Ermakov, as the bullets of the other shooters hit but failed to kill their targets.

=== Further life and death ===
Between 1919 and 1922, Medvedev worked as a Captain in the OGPU and a Commissar in a Red Army Battalion as well as in the Gulag system. After 1922, Medvedev worked as a Major in the NKVD in Saranpaul and Tver in the Second Directorate responsible for monitoring the Church. For a time between 1927 and 1929, he was posted as Commander of a OGPU Border Troops Battalion in the Azeri SSR. After 1929, Medvedev was promoted to Lieutenant Colonel and worked in Baku and Tbilisi as Assistant Chief of the Fourth Directorate tasked with surveilling industrial plants and the Soviet Iranian and Soviet Turkish Border. In 1933, he was transferred to head the bureau responsible for surveilling naval shipyards in Leningrad. Concurrently, he was a guest lecturer in the NKVD Academy and in the Higher Party School. In 1938, Medvedev was appointed assistant to the head of the 1st Branch of the Department of the High Commissioner of the NKVD of the Soviet Union, and was given the rank of Colonel. For much of the War, he was an instructor in the NKVD Academy and then in various other intelligence schools. From 1946 onwards he continued to be assistant to the head of the 1st Branch of the Department of the High Commissioner of the NKVD as well as a teacher in the Higher Party School, and retired in 1951

In July 1962, nearing the end of his life, he turned to the party archives of the Sverdlovsk Regional Committee of the CPSU with a request "to confirm his direct participation in the execution of the former Tsar Nicholas II and his family." Before his death, Medvedev left a memoir about the murder of the imperial family, personally addressed to Nikita Khrushchev, entitled "Through Hostile Whirlwinds." These memoirs have not been published and are currently kept in the Russian State Archive of Contemporary History.

Medvedev died in Moscow on January 13, 1964. He was buried with full military honors at the Novodevichy Cemetery. In his will, he asked his son Mikhail to gift to Khrushchev the Browning M1911, with which he claimed he had killed the Tsar, and to give to Fidel Castro a Colt which he used in during the civil war in 1919.

== Claims of the destruction of the remains ==
When the topic of the search for the remains of the imperial family was not yet discussed, Medvedev left behind a commentary that, according to some, makes it possible to doubt the belonging of the remains found in July 1991 in the vicinity of Yekaterinburg to the Tsar and his family.

"In 1961, at the editorial office of the Ural Worker newspaper, where my father worked, there was a meeting with a participant in the events, Mikhail Medvedev” recalls S.V. Ilyichev. "He told how the next day after the murder, traces were destroyed: naked bodies were doused with sulfuric acid, and then dismembered, doused with gasoline and burned at the stake. What was left was then dumped into an old mine. Medvedev tried to find it in 1946, but could not: he said that over time the ridge was covered with vegetation". A similar claim was made by Pyotr Voykov. However, a DNA analysis published on 17 July 2018 verified the authenticity of the remains as being those of Nicholas II and his family members.

== See also ==
- Outline of the Russian Revolution and Civil War
- Bibliography of the Russian Revolution and Civil War
- Bibliography of Stalinism and the Soviet Union
- Index of Old Bolsheviks
- Index of articles related to the Russian Revolution and Civil War
