= Peter Ermakov =

Russian Bolshevik revolutionary

Pyotr Zakharovich Ermakov
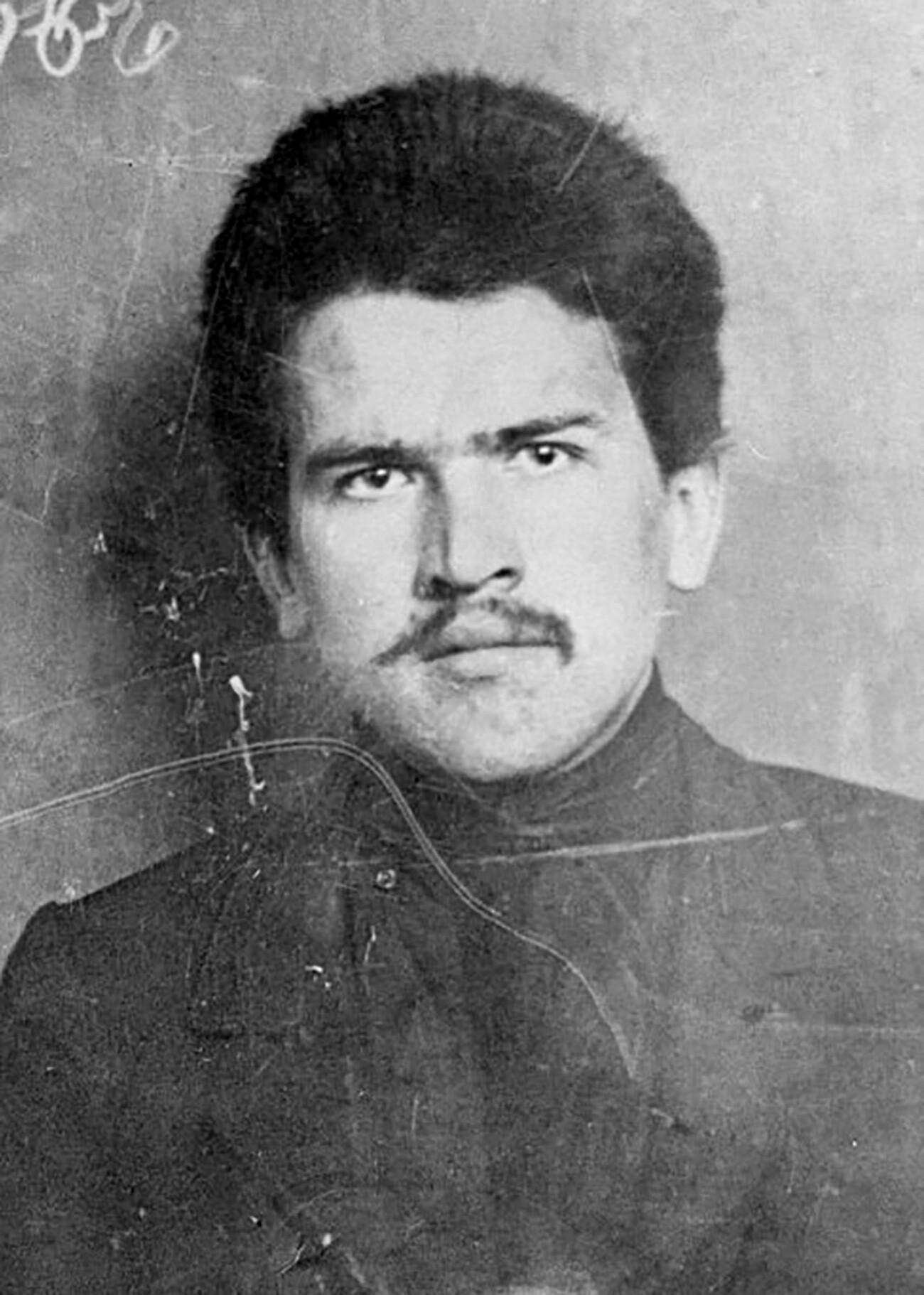
- Born: 13 December 1884; Yekaterinburg, Russia
- Died: 22 May 1952 (aged 67); Sverdlovsk, Soviet Union
- Known for: Responsible for the murder of the Romanov family

Pyotr Zakharovich Ermakov (Russian: Пётр Захарович Ермаков; 13 December [O.S. 1 December] 1884 – 22 May 1952) was a Russian Bolshevik revolutionary, notable as one of several men responsible for carrying out the murder of the Romanov family, including the deposed Tsar Nicholas II, his wife, their children, and their retinue.

== Biography ==
Pyotr Zakharovich Ermakov was born on 13 December [O.S. 1 December] 1884, in to the family of a Russian factory worker and raised in and around the Verkh-Isetskiy workhouse in Yekaterinburg, Russian Empire. Ermakov graduated from the local parish school, working thereafter as a metal craftsman, and between 1909 and 1912, is listed as living in Vologodskaya Province. In January 1906, Ermakov became a member of the Russian Social Democratic Labour Party and became head of the illegal combat organisation of the RSDLP in the Verkh-Isetskiy.

Soon, Ermakov became a member of the underground Yekaterinburg Committee of the RSDLP, which transferred him to an illegal position. Ermakov was assigned the role of one of the leaders of the militants, whose main task was expropriation. The most striking event for Ermakov was the expropriation of the factory cash desk in favor of the Ural Committee of the RSDLP, during which 6 people were killed and 12,400 rubles were seized. During a congress of the Ural party district, Ermakov was arrested, imprisoned for one year and then exiled to the city of Velsk.

By the outbreak of the First World War in 1914, Ermakov had returned to Yekaterinburg, and by the collapse of the Russian Empire in 1917 following the Russian Revolution, had aligned himself with the Bolshevik faction. He became a member of the combat guard of the Verkh-Isetskiy plant, participating in the protection of clandestine meetings, the expropriation of private property, and the murder of loyalist provocateurs.

== Murder of the Imperial Family ==
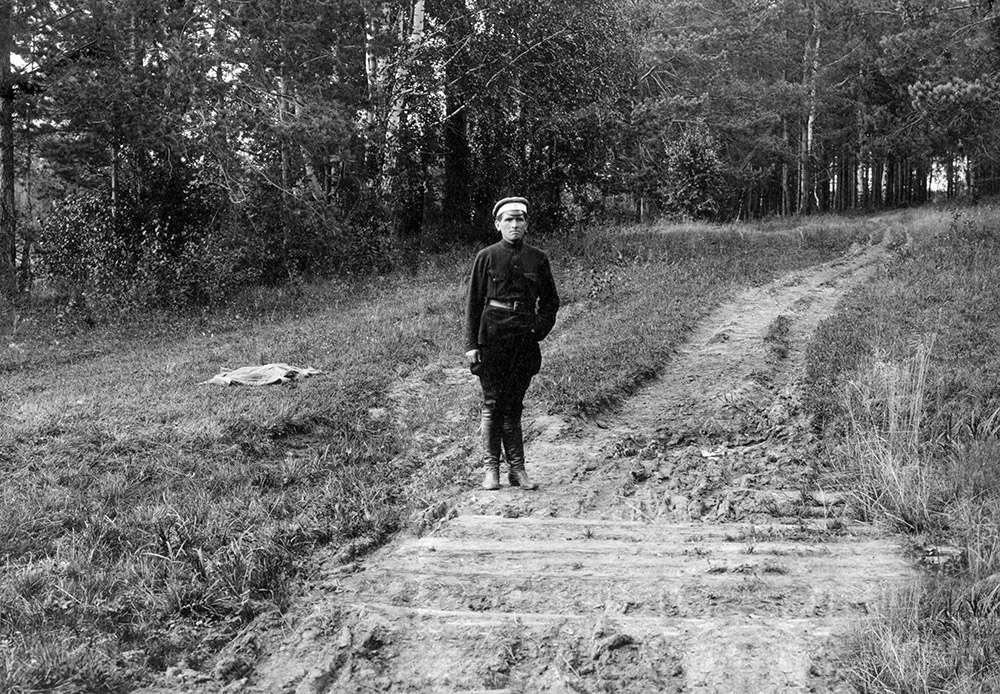
Ermakov in 1920: "I am standing on the grave of the Tsar".

By early 1918, the former Russian Imperial Family was in Bolshevik custody, and had originally been transported to the city of Tobolsk following Tsar Nicholas II's abdication. The imperial family was moved again to Yekaterinburg as a result of White Army forces approaching the outskirts of Tobolsk. By mid-1918, with White Army forces now edging closer to the outskirts of Yekaterinburg, the local Bolshevik authorities were instructed by Yakov Sverdlov, with the assent of Vladimir Lenin by means of a telegram, to execute the imperial family. Feeling that the guards guarding the family had possibly become too sympathetic, it was decided to replace them with zealous Bolsheviks. Among them was Pyotr Ermakov, in order to insure the execution would be completed without failure.

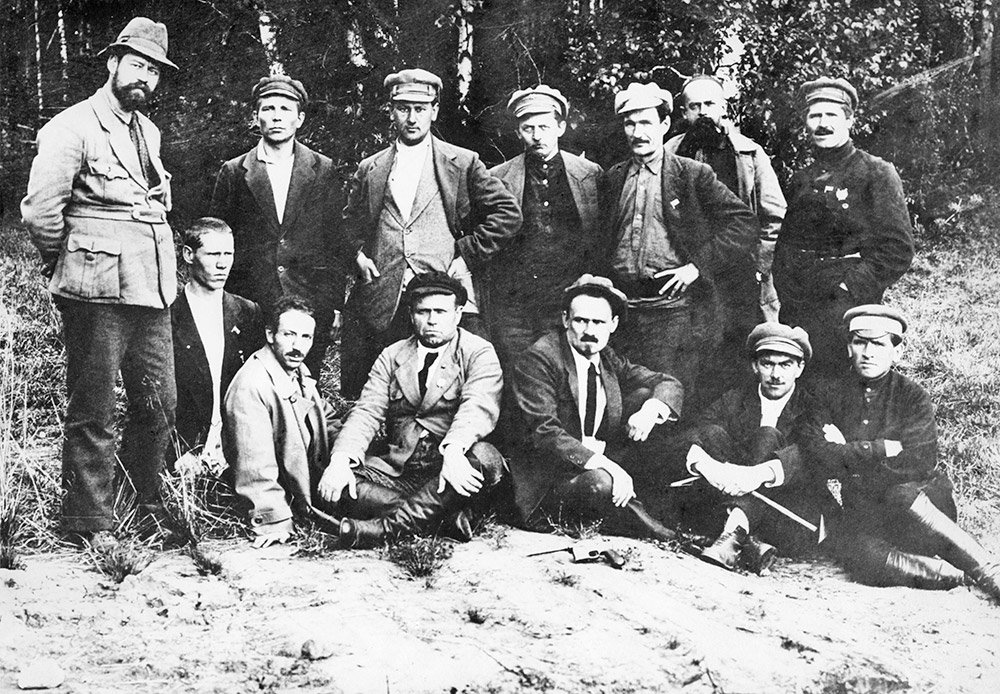
1924 Photograph of Ural Bolsheviks From left to right: Top 1st row - A. I. Paramonov, N. N., M. M. Kharitonov, B.V. Didkovsky, I. P. Rumyantsev, N. N., A. L. Borchaninov; Bottom 2nd row - D. E. Sulimov, G.S. Frost, M.V. Vasilyev, V.M. Bykov, A.G. Kabanov, P. S. Ermakov. They stand and sit on a bridge of sleepers under which the royal family was buried, and next lies Ermakov's mauser, with which, in his own words, he "shot the Tsar".

According to historians Greg King and Penny Wilson, Ermakov played a leading role in the executions, and is considered to have been the right-hand man of chief executioner Yakov Yurovsky. On the night of the executions, Ermakov was very intoxicated, and according to the account by King and Wilson, was the most bloodthirsty of the executioners. According to various reports, Ermakov was among the many men in the firing squad who shot the already-dead former Tsar. His next target was Empress Alexandra, who was unable to finish the sign of the cross before she was shot dead. After momentarily stopping the firing due to the large amounts of rifle smoke, the executioners were ordered to also execute the Tsar's daughters Grand Duchess Olga, Tatiana, Maria and Anastasia, and their remaining servant Anna Demidova. Ermakov is reported to have delivered the killing blow to Olga, and severely wounded Maria and Anastasia. According to an account by Peter Voikov, who was the commissar of supplies for the Ural Soviet, during the execution Ermakov yelled out that the maid, Demidova, and the youngest daughter, Anastasia, were still alive. One of the Cheka Latvians drove a bayonet through Anastasia's face. Yurovsky described how Ermakov tried to kill the Grand Duchesses with his bayonet, and that Ermakov's men tried to plunder the jewels found in the clothing.

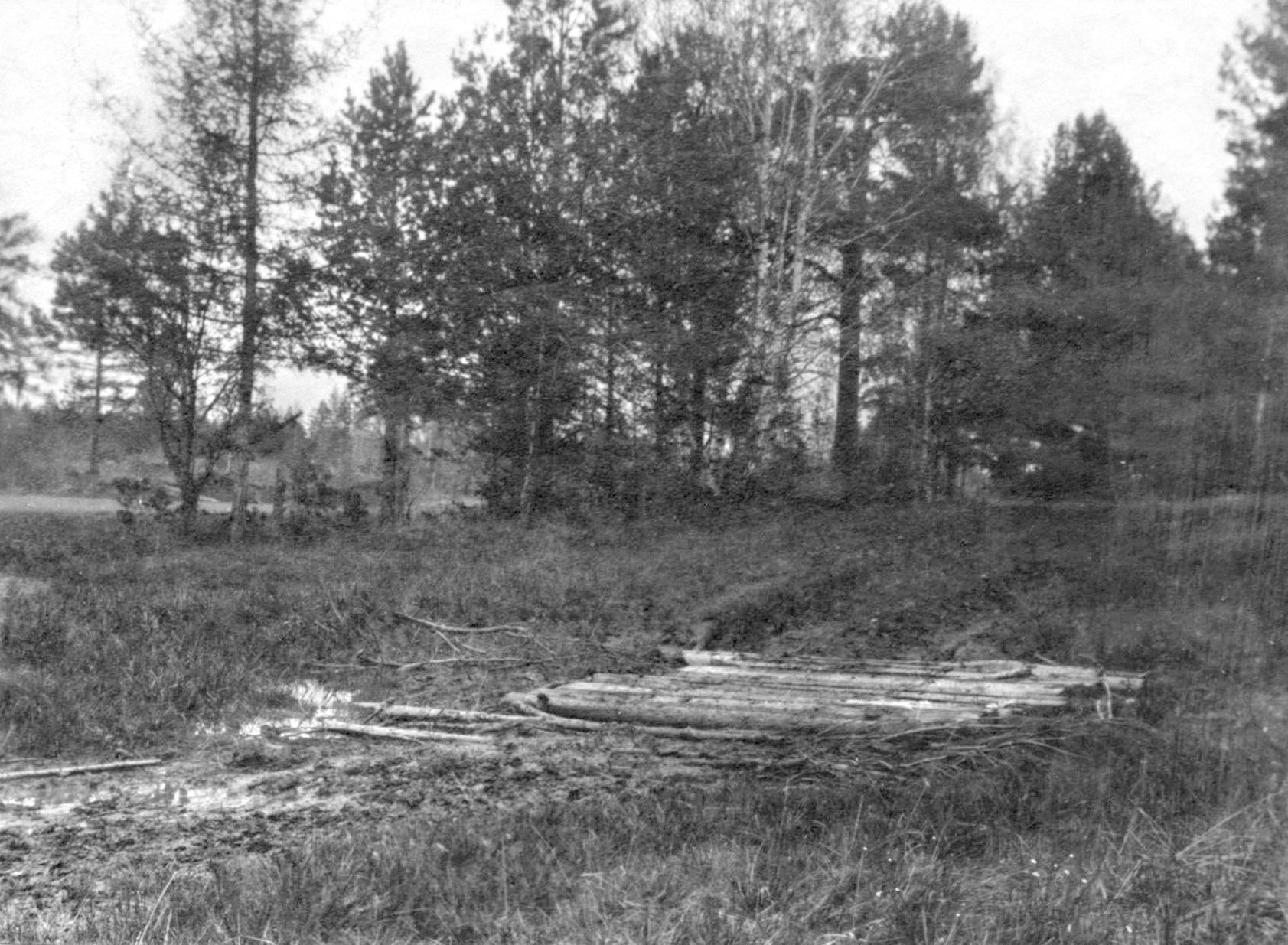
Railroad ties on the Koptyaki Road in 1919. Investigator Nikolai Sokolov took this photograph as evidence of where the Fiat truck had got stuck at 4:30am on 19 July, unaware that it was in fact the second burial site.

Prior to the killings, Ermakov had promised his Upper Isetsk companions that they would get to rape the women and kill the males, instructing them to wait in the forest with light carts for transporting the bodies. However, when Yurovsky's special detachment arrived, Ermakov's men were outraged to discover that they were already dead. Yurovsky maintained control of the situation with great difficulty, eventually getting Ermakov's men to shift some of the bodies from the truck onto the carts. While Yurovsky and his men were busy extricating the truck from the mud, Ermakov's men pawed the female bodies for valuables hidden in their undergarments, two of whom lifted up Alexandra's skirt and fingered her genitals. Yurovsky ordered them at gunpoint to back off, dismissing the two who had groped the tsarina's corpse and any others he had caught looting. Nonetheless, one of the men sniggered that he could "die in peace", having touched the "royal cunt". With the exception of Ermakov, his men were not allowed to participate in the process of stripping, mutilating and disposing of the bodies; they were ordered back to the city as Yurovsky did not trust them and was displeased with their drunkenness. He was also furious at Ermakov for bringing only one shovel for the disposal.

== Later life ==
Ermakov later participated directly in the Russian Civil War, and after the war found work in law enforcement in Omsk, Yekaterinburg, and Chelyabinsk. His political career did not work out, in large parts due to his borderline illiteracy and alcoholism. In 1927, Ermakov was employed as inspector for the prisons of the Urals region, and by 1934 was drawing his pension.

In 1935, Ermakov, claiming to be dying of cancer, gave an interview to American journalist Richard Halliburton, describing the burning and destruction of the bodies of the Imperial family and their servants. It was later discovered that his "deathbed confession" had been staged by the NKVD; the story was deliberately fabricated and then spoon-fed to the naive Halliburton in order to conceal the actual events.

Unlike the other killers, Ermakov received no awards or advancements for his part in the murders, for which he grew bitter. For the rest of his life, he fought relentlessly for primacy by inaccurately inflating his role in the murders as well as the revolution. Towards the end of his life, he lived in extreme poverty. The memoirs of residents of Sverdlovsk, who saw him at the end of his life on the church porch, have been preserved: Ermakov begged for alms.

== Death ==
Ermakov died in Sverdlovsk on 22 May 1952 from throat cancer at the age of 67 and was buried at Ivanovskoye Kladbishche. After his death, which was reported in the Ural Worker, the local Communist Party renamed one of the streets in Sverdlovsk to Ermakova. After 1991, the street was renamed back to its historical name of Klyuchevskaya. Since the fall of the Soviet Union, some local Communist Party members annually pay tribute to his gravestone on each anniversary of the murders, though on several occasions it has also been vandalized. Since the 1980s, the gravestone has been shot several times and doused in red paint, symbolizing the blood of the royal martyrs.

== In popular culture ==
Ermakov appears as the principal antagonist in the 2020 Kazakh historical drama film The Crying Steppe, portrayed by Russian actor Sergey Ufimtzev. In the film, Ermakov is ahistorically depicted as a high level official under Filipp Goloshchyokin in the Kazakh ASSR during the period of collectivization and the resulting famine. In the film, Ermakov is also inaccurately depicted in a flashback scene showing the murder of the Imperial family as not wanting to kill the Romanovs and being hesitant to shoot until Yurovsky forces him to finish off the Tsar's young son Alexei after mortally wounding him, leaving a traumatized Ermakov to report the news of the slaying to Goloshchyokin. Ermakov is shown as suffering from PTSD as a result of his involvement in the killing of the family and their retainers, witnessing hallucinations of a bloody Alexei at several points throughout the film.

== See also ==
- Outline of the Russian Revolution and Civil War
- Bibliography of the Russian Revolution and Civil War
- Bibliography of Stalinism and the Soviet Union
- Index of Old Bolsheviks
- Index of articles related to the Russian Revolution and Civil War

== Bibliography ==
- Alexandrov, Victor (1966). The End of the Romanovs. Boston: Little, Brown. OCLC 1033574974.
- Massie, Robert K. (2012). The Romanovs: The Final Chapter. New York: The Modern Library. ISBN 9780679645634.
- Rappaport, Helen (2010). The Last Days of the Romanovs: Tragedy at Ekaterinburg. New York: St. Martin's Griffin. ISBN 9780312603472.
- Radzinsky, Edvard (2011). The Last Tsar: The Life and Death of Nicholas II. New York: Anchor Books Doubleday. ISBN 9781299006898.
- Slater, Wendy (2007). The Many Deaths of Tsar Nicholas II: Relics, Remains and the Romanovs. New York: Routledge. ISBN 9780415345163.
- Steinberg, Mark D.; Khrustalev, Vladimir M. (1995). The Fall of the Romanovs: Political Dreams and Personal Struggles in a Time of Revolution. New Haven, Conn.: Yale University Press. ISBN 9780300065572.
