= Grigory Nikulin =

Russian Bolshevik revolutionary (1895–1965)

Grigory Petrovich Nikulin Григорий Петрович Никулин
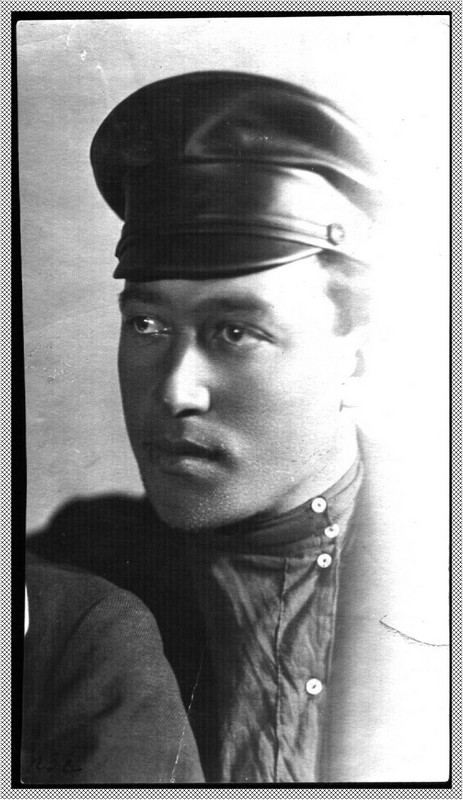
- Born: 10 January 1895; Zvenigorodka, Kiev Governorate, Russian Empire
- Died: 22 September 1965 (aged 70); Moscow, Soviet Union

Grigory Petrovich Nikulin (Russian: Григо́рий Петро́вич Нику́лин; 10 January 1895 [O.S. 27 December 1894] – 22 September 1965) was a Russian Bolshevik revolutionary best known for taking part in the execution of the Emperor Nicholas II of Russia, his family and four others on the night of 16 July 1918.

== Early life ==
Nikulin was born and raised in Zvenigorodka, Kiev province, Russian Empire. He came from a lower-class family. His father Pyotr Iossiffovich (Пётр Иосифович) was a bricklayer and mother Anna Ivanovna a housewife. At the age of 9 Grigory started attending parish school at Zvenigorod church, which he enjoyed immensely. Education was interrupted by his family's disastrous financial situation. After which he started working in a local blacksmith shop. In the spring of 1909 family sold their house in Zvenigorodka and moved to a nearby small town of Uman. At the age of 16 Grigory moved out of parents' house and became a bricklayer. He joined a local social democratic club in Uman in 1913. Soon he was deported from Kiev province and moved to Kazan.

=== Joining the Bolsheviks ===
In January 1915 he was drafted into the Imperial army, but due to congenital diseases was only fit for wartime militia units and not for regular service. Early in 1916 Grigory moved to Tavatui near Yekaterinburg and started working at the construction site of the dynamite plant (Таватуйский динамитный завод). Very soon after moving he was drawn to local Bolsheviks and met Mikhail Kabanov who helped him become a devoted follower of Lenin. By the end of 1916 he was organizing a strike at the dynamite plant. In March 1917 Nikulin became a member of the Bolshevik faction of the Russian Social Democratic Labour Party (RSDLP). The number of his party membership was 128185.

As a result of financing problems with French joint-stock company, plant activists decided to stop all work with the construction of this facility early in 1918. Nikulin was sent to Yekaterinburg along with all the party members of the factory. He met Goloschekin, a member of the Ural Regional Committee of the RSDLP and joined the Ural Cheka on his recommendation. Starting his service in Cheka, Nikulin soon became acquainted with Yakov Yurovsky, who noticed Nikulin's modesty, ability to get along with different people, honesty and absolute sobriety. The two became friends and formed a special relationship that lasted for years where Yurovsky simply called him "son". Nikulin was appointed Assistant to the Commandant of the House of Special Purpose on the recommendation of Yurovsky. The Commandant was Yurovsky himself.

== Yekaterinburg Cheka ==
Having begun work in the Cheka, Grigory was assigned some serious cases. One of the first was discrete surveillance of Alexander Ivanovich Andogsky, the head of the Military Academy of Workers' and Peasants' Red Army. Nikulin was introduced as a domestic worker to Andogsky after the academy was evacuated from Petrograd to Yekaterinburg in March 1918. Later the same year Andogsky joined the White forces, was dismissed from the Military Academy and eventually was appointed as General in Kolchak's Army.

Nikulin was also in charge of soldier selection for train convoy L-42, on 30 April 1918 where Tsar Nicholas II and part of his family were moved from Tyumen to Yekaterinburg.

=== Killing of Prince Dolgorukov ===
Prince Vasily Alexandrovich Dolgorukov was a close friend of Nicholas II as well as his adviser, Marshal of the Imperial Court (1914–1917) and Commander of the Imperial Guard cavalry regiment. Deeply devoted to the Tsar he voluntarily accompanied the Imperial family to imprisonment in Tobolsk. After arriving in Yekaterinburg at the end of May he was separated from the family and arrested. Dolgorukov was executed 10 July 1918 in cold blood by Nikulin, a week before the killing of Tsar Nicholas II and his family. Dolgorukov was taken to a field beyond the city's Ivanovskoe Cemetery with Count Tatishchev and the two were shot in the head and thrown into a pit. Nikulin recalled the incident in his radio interview 1964: "Я вывез его в поле и проклял всё пока тащил чемоданы назад" (I took him out to the field and cursed everything while I was dragging his suitcases back). Dolgorukov was canonized by the Russian Orthodox Church in 1981.

Nikulin was also involved in death of Bishop Hermogenes (Dolganyov) of Tobolsk and Siberia, who was drowned in the Tura River by the Bolsheviks.

=== Killing of the Romanovs ===
Grigory Nikulin is known for his participation in the killing of Tsar Nicholas II and his family. Nikulin was living in the House of Special Purpose since his appointment as Assistant to the Commandant. He was also in charge of the house in the absence of Yurovsky who lived in the "American Hotel." The Ural Regional Soviet agreed in a meeting on June 29 that the Romanov family should be executed. After getting the final approval from the Central Executive Committee in Moscow, Yurovsky organized a meeting in the American Hotel. Participation in the killing was voluntary and people who agreed to participate came to Yurovsky's room. It was agreed that, to prevent unnecessary suffering, the condemned were to be shot in the heart.

On 17 July, right after midnight, Yurovsky woke up the Tsar, his family, doctor, and servants (11 persons altogether), and guided them to an empty room in the lower floor of the house. On demand of Tsarina Alexandra, Nikulin brought two chairs. One for her and one for Tsarevich Alexei. Yurovsky announced the verdict: "Nikolai Alexandrovich, in view of the fact that your relatives are continuing their attack on Soviet Russia, the Ural Executive Committee has decided to execute you." The shooting started. It is unknown who actually shot the Tsar – Yurovsky, Medvedev, Ermakov, or all of them. Nikulin shot one bullet to Alexei and left the room. Alexei didn't die from this shot. Yurovsky then shot Alexei in the head, which is what killed him. Long after this event, in a private conversation with the son of Mikhail Medvedev, Nikulin said that he couldn't bear having the sick boy looking at him and stopped shooting.

Afterwards, Nikulin oversaw the carrying of the corpses to a truck waiting outside. He had all the jewels and valuables that had been sewn into the clothes of the royal family removed. On July 20, just a few days before the arrival of the White Army, Nikulin left Yekaterinburg. He personally carried 6,000 carats of the Tsar's diamonds to the State Bank in Moscow.

Nikulin initially left a good impression on the Imperial family during visits to the Ipatiev House with Yurovsky. He wasn't like the others. He was well-mannered and polite. From the diary of Alexandra Feodorovna: "June 21st, Thursday. "..young assistant, who seems very nice person, compared to other ones that are vulgar and unpleasant.. Young man (Nikulin) enumerated jewelry items and did it thoroughly". From the diary of Nicholas II: "June 23th, Saturday. Yurovsky and his assistant (Nikulin) started to understand what sort of people was around, stealing from us and guarded us from them". However, after Yurovsky became commandant of the Ipatiev House on 4 July and continuously tightened restrictions imposed on the Romanov family, Nicholas wrote in his diary on 11 July, "We like this man less and less."

== After Yekaterinburg ==
After completing the assignment in Yekaterinburg, Nikulin joined the Red Army. He had several duties at 3rd Army of the Eastern front. He even took part in battles. Early 1919 he started working for political department of the division (politotdel) but contracted typhus and was taken to Moscow. There he met again Yurovsky, who worked for Moscow City Council at the time and offered him a job as head of the Moscow apartment houses. They continued their warm friendship meeting each other on and off duty.

Nikulin stayed in Moscow and worked in different jobs. First for City Council (MosSoviet). Later he was allocated to the position of Moscow prisons head. Four months after that the head of inspectorate department of Moscow police. He then worked as the head of Moscow Criminal Investigation Department from March 1920 to 1922. In 1922 he was awarded with the Order of the Red Banner.

== Later life ==
Between 1923 and 1938 Nikulin held several noteworthy positions. From 1923 to 1924 he was Vice-head of the Moscow Criminal Investigation Department. In 1925 he was a member of MosGorIspolCom (Moscow Executive Committee). From 1925 to 1930 he was the head of MosGubStrakh (Moscow Insurance State Company). From 1930 to 1931 he was the head of MosGas (Moscow Gas trest). From 1933 to 1935 he worked at MosSovet on a problem concerning building materials manufacturing, and from 1935 to 1938 he was the head of MosZhilOtdel (Moscow Housing Department).

He was often visited by comrades such as Rodzinsky and Medvedev. In 1927 Nikulin and Yurovsky made an application to the USSR Revolution Museum and handed them two revolvers which were used in the killing of Imperial Family.

Yurovsky died in 1938. Before dying he wrote a warm farewell letter to his dear friend Nikulin leaving him a list of documents to be delivered to the Revolution Museum. From 1938 to his retirement in 1960 Nikulin worked for Department of Water and Sewerage. He was awarded with four state orders, one of which was Order of the Patriotic War 1st class (1947). During his whole life Nikulin insisted on keeping low profile concerning the killing of imperial family. He even asked Medvedev not to mention his role in the execution. One year before his death he was asked by a high party official to give an interview on radio. It resulted in a 3-hour recording in which he talks about everything. "All was done consciously, without doubts. I did understand all responsibility. I welcomed the decision of Ural Regional Soviet.. And even more, if it is allowed to say, I considered it as an honor."

Grigory Nikulin died on 22 September 1965. He was buried on the site of the "Old Bolsheviks" at Novodevichy Cemetery in Moscow. Across from Nikulin's grave is the grave of Boris Yeltsin, President of the Russian Federation. Ipatiev House was demolished by order of Boris Yeltsin in 1977 while he was leader of the Sverdlovsk Executive Committee. The Politburo had declared the house not to be of "sufficient historical significance".
