= Yakov Yurovsky =

Chief executioner of Tsar Nicholas II (1878–1938)

- Яков Юровский
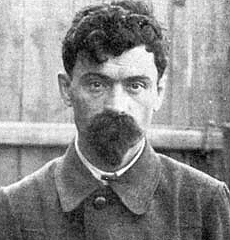
- Yurovsky in 1918
- Born: 19 June 1878; Tomsk, Russia
- Died: 2 August 1938 (aged 60); Moscow, Soviet Union
- Occupations: Watchmaker, Chekist, Chief of the Gold Department, Gokhran; Management staff, Soviet Polytechnic Museum
- Political party: RSDLP (Bolsheviks) (1905–1918); Russian Communist Party (1918–1938)

Yakov Mikhailovich Yurovsky (Note: In this name that follows East Slavic naming customs, the patronymic is Mikhailovich and the family name is Yurovsky.) (Russian: Яков Михайлович Юровский, pronounced [ˈjakəf mʲɪˈxajləvʲɪtɕ jʊˈrofskʲɪj]; 19 June [O.S. 7 June] 1878 (Note: Unless otherwise noted, all dates used in this article are of the Gregorian Calendar, as opposed to the Julian Calendar which was used in Russia prior to 14 February [O.S. 1 February] 1918.) – 2 August 1938) was a Russian Bolshevik revolutionary and Soviet Chekist (secret policeman). Yurovsky was commander of the guard at Ipatiev House during the murder of the Romanov family on the night of 17 July 1918. He is known as the chief executioner of Emperor Nicholas II of Russia, his family, and four of their servants. Yurovsky was responsible for the distribution of weapons, ordering the family to the cellar room, announcing the execution to the family, and the disposal of the eleven bodies.

== Biography ==
=== Early life ===
Yakov Mikhailovich Yurovsky was the eighth of ten children born to Chaim, son of Izka, a glazier, and his wife Ester daughter of Moishe (1848–1919), a seamstress. He was born on 19 June [O.S. 7 June] 1878 in the Siberian city of Tomsk, Russia. The Yurovsky family was Jewish. The historian Helen Rappaport writes that the young Yurovsky studied the Talmud in his early youth. While the young Yurovsky was raised as a Jew, his family seemed to have later attempted to distance themselves from their Jewish roots. This may have been prompted by the prejudice toward Jews frequently exhibited in Russia at the time, which included antisemitic pogroms in the empire. Shortly before fully devoting himself to the cause of revolution, in the early twentieth century, Yurovsky converted to Lutheranism.

A watchmaker by trade, he lived for a short time in the German Empire in 1904.

After returning to Russia during the Russian Revolution of 1905, he joined the Bolsheviks. He received the party ticket no.1500 in the Krasnopresnenskaya organization. Arrested several times over the years, he became a devoted Marxist. He was a Chekist during the Russian Civil War, from at least 1917–1919.

=== Execution of the imperial family ===
Citing the dire military situation on the Eastern Front, the Ural Soviet had decided in either late June or early July to execute Nicholas, and the decision was communicated to Yurovsky, the commandant of the Ipatiev House. “On July 16, 6 PM, Filipp Goloshchyokin [Yurovsky’s boss, member of the Yekaterinburg Bolshevik committee] ordered me to execute the task,” Yurovsky reported. At 8 PM, July 16, a telegraph was sent to Moscow, containing the words: “We can’t wait. If your opinions are opposite, let us know right now, out of any queue. Goloshchyokin.” Goloshchyokin, the man in charge of the executive decision, waited a few hours for a reply, and when none came he ordered the execution of the royal family.

On the night of 16/17 July 1918, a squad of Bolshevik secret police (Cheka) led by Yurovsky executed Russia's last emperor, Nicholas II, along with his wife Alexandra, their son Alexei, and their four daughters Olga, Tatiana, Maria, and Anastasia. Four members of the imperial household–court physician Eugene Botkin, chambermaid Anna Demidova, cook Ivan Kharitonov and footman Alexei Trupp–were also killed. All were shot in a half-cellar room (measured to be 8.5 metres (28 ft) x 7 metres (23 ft)) of the Ipatiev House in Yekaterinburg where they were being held prisoner.

It has since been documented that the order to assassinate the imperial family came from Yakov Sverdlov in Moscow.

According to Leon Trotsky's diaries, Lenin supported and decided upon the killing of the Tsar and his family. After Trotsky returned from the front (of the Russian Civil War) he had the following dialogue with Sverdlov:

My next visit to Moscow took place after the [temporary] fall of Yekaterinburg [to anti-Communist forces]. Speaking with Sverdlov, I asked in passing: "Oh yes, and where is the Tsar?"

"Finished," he replied. "He has been shot."

"And where is the family?"

"The family along with him."

"All of them?," I asked, apparently with a trace of surprise.

"All of them," replied Sverdlov. "What about it?" He was waiting to see my reaction. I made no reply.

"And who made the decision?," I asked.

"We decided it here. Ilyich believed that we shouldn't leave the Whites a live banner to rally around, especially under the present difficult circumstances."

I asked no further questions and considered the matter closed.

To prevent the development of a personality cult of the former imperial family, the corpses were stripped and dismembered; then taken to the countryside, where they were initially thrown into an abandoned mineshaft. The following morning, when rumours spread in Yekaterinburg regarding the disposal site, Yurovsky removed the bodies. When the vehicle carrying the bodies broke down on the way to the next chosen site, he made new arrangements and threw the bodies into a pit on Koptyaki Road, a since-abandoned cart track 19 kilometres (12 mi) north of Yekaterinburg, and doused the dismembered remains with sulfuric acid before burying them and sealing the pit with wooden railroad ties.

=== Post–Civil War and death ===
During and after the Russian Civil War, Yurovsky worked as a head of local Cheka in Moscow, then a member of Vyatka Cheka, head of Yekaterinburg Cheka (1919). In 1921, he worked in the Rabkrin and became Chief of the Gold Department of the Soviet State Treasury. Yurovsky achieved a solid reputation by combating corruption and theft. He also worked in management at the Polytechnical Museum starting in 1928 and became its director in 1930.

Yurovsky had a history of health problems, including stomach issues and heart disease. In 1938, his daughter Rimma was arrested and deported to the gulag as a Trotskyite, which reportedly had a severe impact on his health. Yurovsky begged his old friend Goloshchyokin, then president of the State Council of Arbitration, for clemency, but Goloshchyokin informed him there was nothing to be done.

After an especially painful ulcerative episode, Yurovsky was hospitalized and unexpectedly transferred to the Kremlin Hospital, which was normally off limits to all but the most high level government officials. He died on 2 August 1938 reportedly of a duodenal, or peptic ulcer.

There have been allegations that Yurovsky was in fact poisoned at the behest of the NKVD in connection with the arrest of his daughter as a Trotskyist. Popular historian Edvard Radzinsky stated that Yurovsky's death was hastened by the administration of a lethal poison in the Kremlin Hospital by the NKVD. Unproven allegations have also been made he was deliberately denied adequate medical treatment. His death occurred during the height of Joseph Stalin's Great Purge, in which many of his Ural compatriots were executed.

Rimma was released in 1946 and remained in Kazakhstan until her political rehabilitation ten years later. She then moved back to Leningrad.

Yurovsky's eldest son Alexander, a rear admiral in the Soviet Navy, was arrested in 1952, but was released a year later after Stalin's death. He said that his father greatly regretted his role in the execution of the Romanovs.

== See also ==
- Outline of the Russian Revolution and Civil War
- Bibliography of the Russian Revolution and Civil War
- Bibliography of Stalinism and the Soviet Union
- Index of Old Bolsheviks
- Index of articles related to the Russian Revolution and Civil War

== Sources ==
- Radzinsky, Edward (2011). The Last Tsar: The Life and Death of Nicholas II. Knopf Doubleday Publishing Group. ISBN 978-0385469623.
