= Medvedev =

Medvedev (Russian: Медве́дев) and female Medvedeva (Медве́дева), from Russian medved’ (медве́дь), meaning the animal "bear", are Slavic surnames. Notable bearers of the name include:

== Medvedev ==
(male form):

- Alexander Medvedev (born 1955), Russian business manager
- Aleksei Medvedev (disambiguation) – several people
- Andrey Medvedev – several people, including Andriy Medvedev (born 1974), Ukrainian tennis player
- Daniil Medvedev (born 1996), Russian tennis player
- Dmitry Medvedev (disambiguation) – several people, including Dmitry Medvedev (born 1965), Russian politician, former Prime Minister of the Russian Federation, former President of Russia, and Dmitry Medvedev (partisan) (1898–1954), Russian partisan leader in World War II
- Evgeny Medvedev (born 1982), Russian ice hockey defenceman
- Grigory Medvedev, Soviet sprint canoeist
- Hennadiy Medvedyev (born 1975), Ukrainian footballer
- Ilya Medvedev (born 1983), Russian Olympic canoer
- Maksim Medvedev (born 1989), Azerbaijani footballer
- Mikhail Medvedev (1891–1964), Bolshevik, Chekist
- Pavel Medvedev (disambiguation) – several people
- Roy Medvedev (1925–2026), Georgian-born Russian historian
- Sergei Medvedev (disambiguation) – several people
- Vladimir Medvedev (born 1937), KGB general, senior bodyguard of Brezhnev and Gorbachev
- Vladimir Medvedev (footballer) (born 1971), Russian football player
- Vitaly Medvedev (disambiguation) – several people
- Yukhym Medvedev (1886–1938), first elected chairman of the Soviet parliament in Ukraine
- Zhores Medvedev (1925–2018), Georgian-born Russian biologist, historian and activist
- Andrew Medvedev, Dean of Case Western Reserve University's Weatherhead School of Management

== Medvedeva ==
(female form)

- Evgenia Medvedeva (born 1999), Russian figure skater
- Yevgeniya Medvedeva-Arbuzova (born 1976), cross country skier
- Yelena Medvedeva (born 1965), Soviet Olympic rower
- Katya Medvedeva (born 1937), Russian naïve painter
- Natalia Medvedeva (actress) (1915–2007), Russian actress
- Natalia Medvedeva (singer) (1958–2003), Russian singer
- Natalia Medvedeva (tennis) (born 1971), Ukrainian tennis player
- Nijolė Medvedeva (born 1960), Olympic long jumper from Lithuania
- Svetlana Medvedeva (born 1965), former First Lady of Russia

== See also ==
- 17000 Medvedev, asteroid
- Medvedev–Sponheuer–Karnik scale, earthquake intensity scale
