= List of people from Penza =

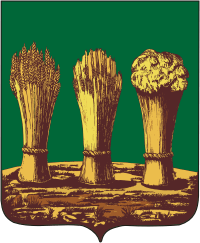
Coat of Arms of Penza

This is a list of notable people who were born or have lived in Penza, Russia.

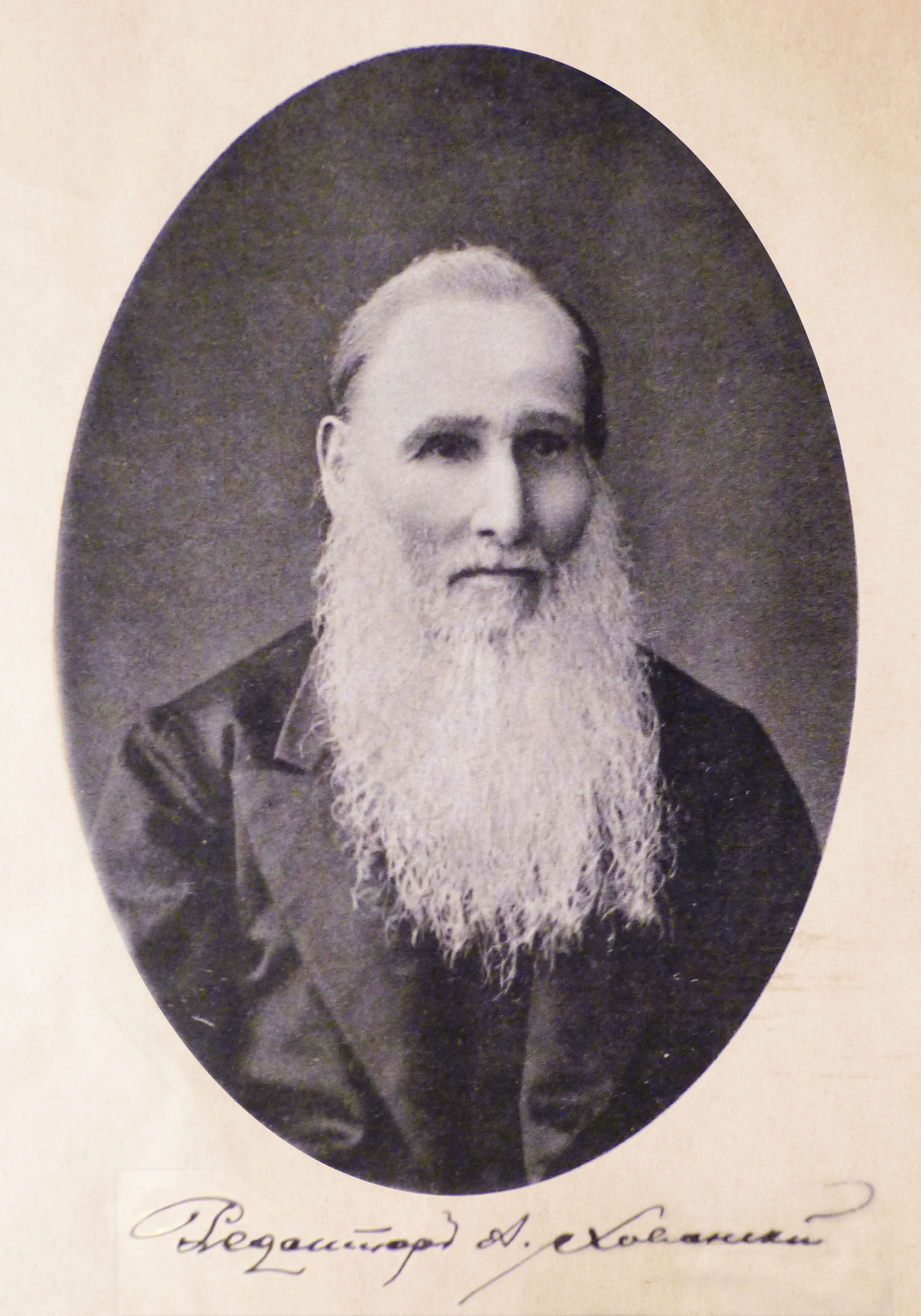
Aleksey Khovansky (1814–1899)

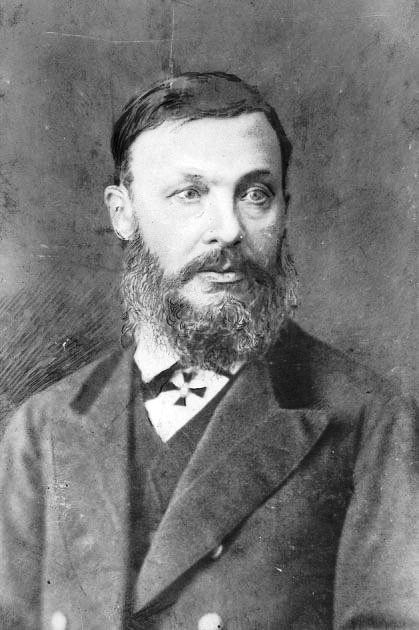
Nikolay Ilminsky (1822–1891)

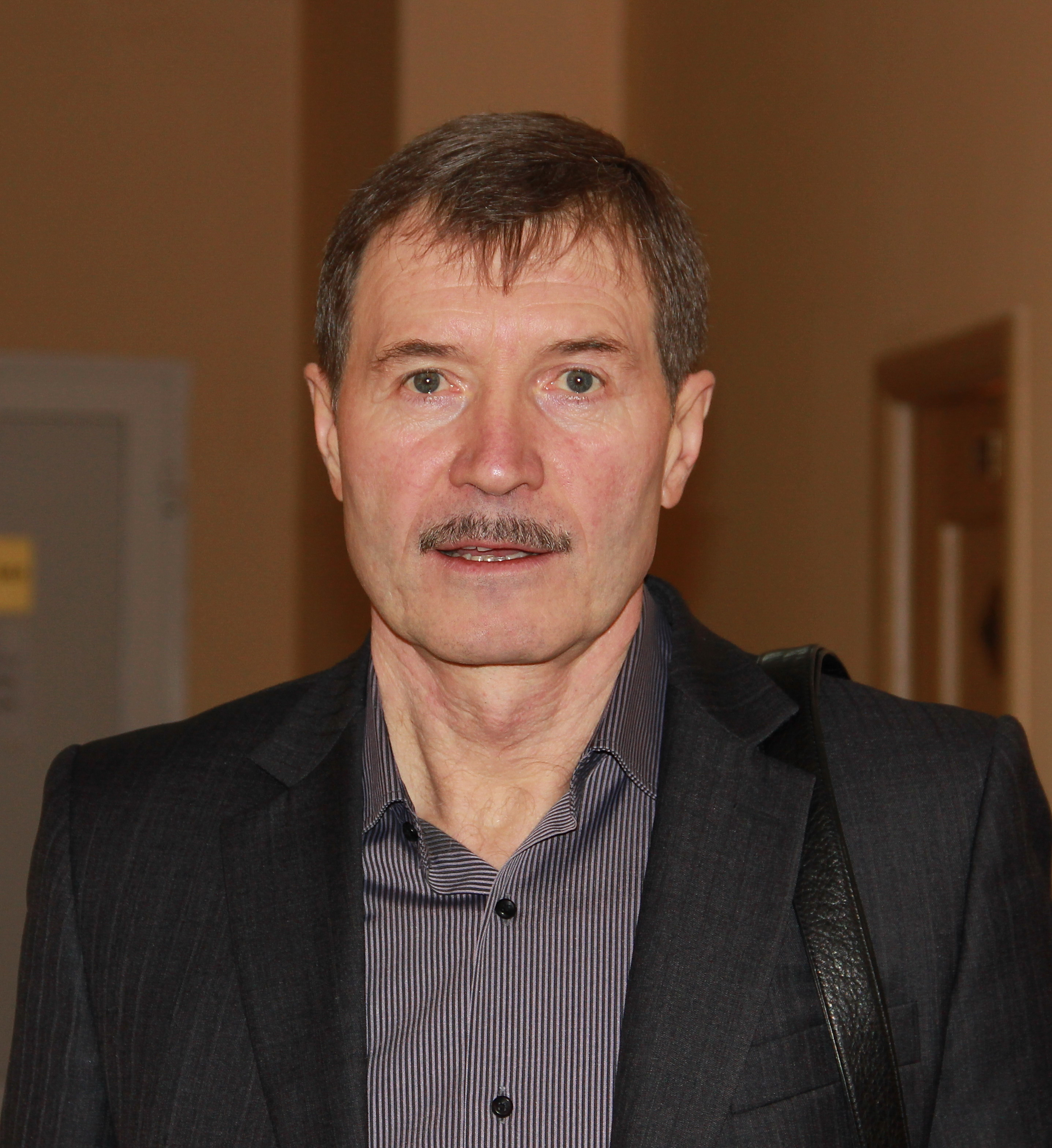
Boris Sokolovsky (born 1953)

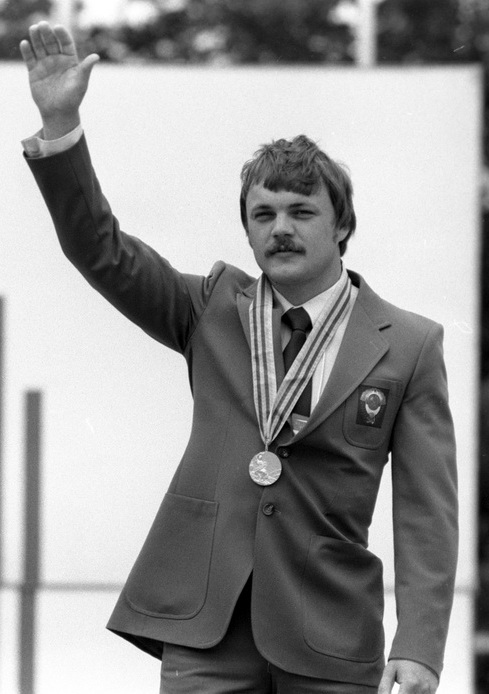
Alexander Melentyev (1954–2015)

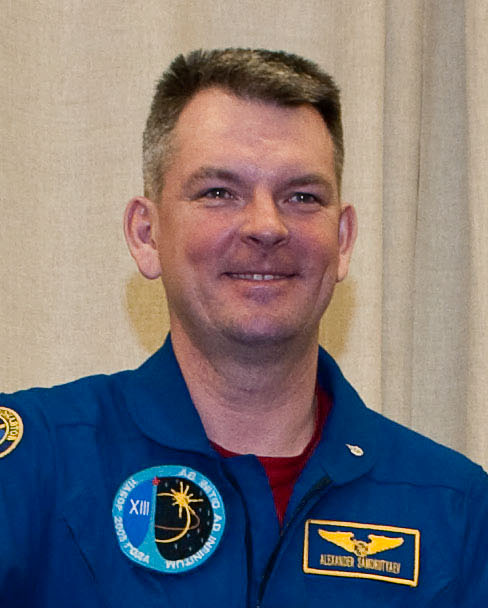
Aleksandr Samokutyayev (born 1970)

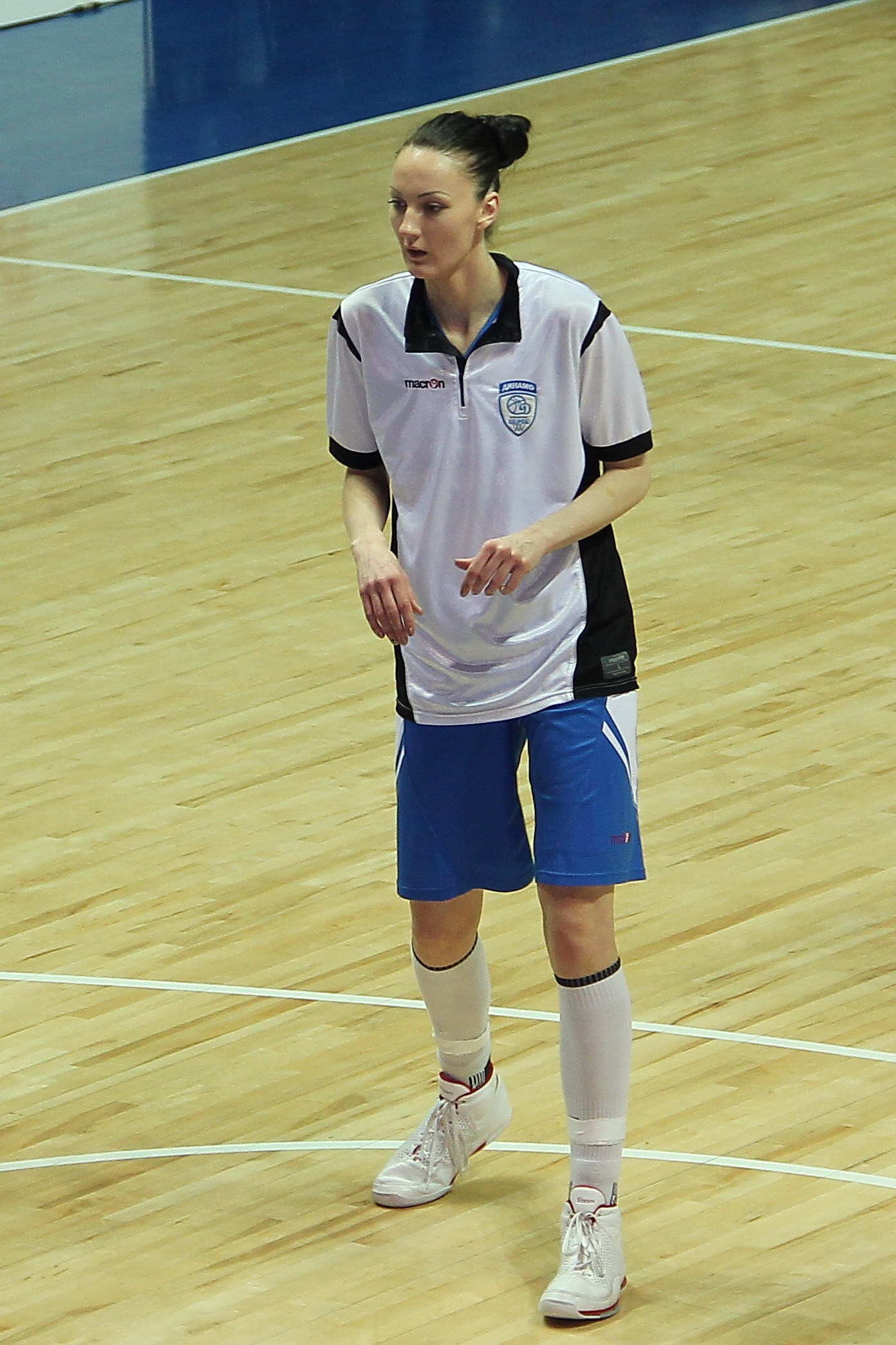
Yekaterina Lisina (born 1987)

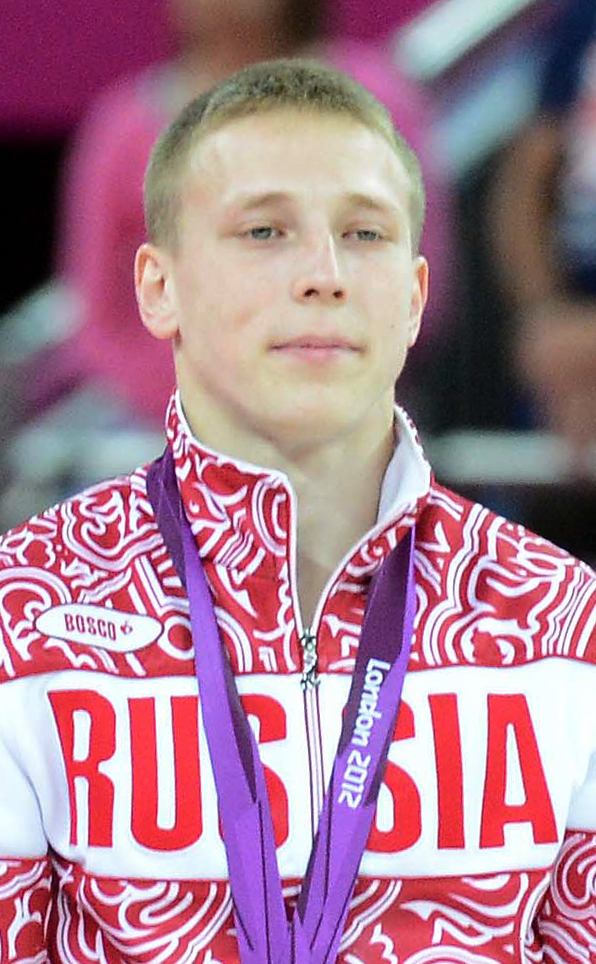
Denis Ablyazin (born 1992)

== Born in Penza ==
=== 19th century ===
==== 1801–1900 ====
- Aleksey Khovansky (1814–1899), publisher of the first Russian scientific linguistic journal Filologicheskie Zapiski
- Nikolay Ilminsky (1822–1891), Russian turkologist
- Pavel Maksutov (1825–1882), Imperial Russian Navy rear-admiral, prince, hero of Crimean War
- Ilya Salov (1834–1902), Russian writer, playwright and translator
- Peter Hermann Stillmark (1860–1923), scientist, founder of lectinology
- Vsevolod Meyerhold (1874–1940), Russian and Soviet theatre director, actor and theatrical producer
- Nikolai Avksentiev (1878–1943), leading member of the Russian Socialist-Revolutionary Party
- Peter Arshinov (1886–1939), acclaimed Russian Anarcho-Communist
- Ivan Mosjoukine (1889–1963), Russian silent film actor
- Vsevolod Pudovkin (1893–1953), Russian and Soviet film director, screenwriter and actor
- Aleksandr Medvedkin (1900–1989), Soviet Russian film director
- Vladimir Stavsky (1900–1943), Soviet Russian writer, editor and literary administrator

=== 20th century ===
==== 1901–1950 ====
- Konstantin Badygin (1910–1984), Soviet naval officer, explorer, author and scientist
- Anna Andreyeva (1915–1997), Soviet track and field athlete
- Pyotr Dolgov (1920–1962), colonel in the Soviet Air Force, Hero of the Soviet Union
- Victor Karpov (1928–1997), Russian diplomat
- Vladimir Grebennikov (1932–1992), Soviet ice hockey player
- Yuri Moiseev (1940–2005), Soviet ice hockey player
- Tatiana Dorofeeva (1948–2012), Russian linguist, orientalist and translator

==== 1951–1970 ====
- Aleksandr Golikov (born 1952), Russian former ice hockey player
- Boris Sokolovsky (born 1953), Russian basketball coach and former player
- Vladimir Golikov (born 1954), Soviet ice hockey player
- Alexander Melentyev (1954–2015), Soviet competitive sport shooter who won the gold medal at the 1980 Summer Olympics
- Vasili Pervukhin (born 1956), Russian ice hockey player
- Alexander Kozhevnikov (born 1958), Soviet ice hockey player
- Aleksandr Gerasimov (1959–2020), Soviet ice hockey player
- Irina Kalinina (born 1959), Soviet diver and olympic champion
- Marat Kulakhmetov (born 1959), Major General of the Russian Army
- Sergei Svetlov (born 1961), Soviet ice hockey player
- Sergei Yashin (1962–2022), Soviet ice hockey player
- Aleksey Vdovin (1963–2022), Russian water polo player who competed in the 1992 Summer Olympics
- Aleksandr Samokutyayev (born 1970), Russian cosmonaut

==== 1971–1980 ====
- Yan Kaminsky (born 1971), Soviet ice hockey player
- Vladislav Bulin (born 1972), Russian ice hockey defenceman
- Yuliya Pakhalina (born 1977), Russian diver; won the gold medal in the 2000 Summer Olympics
- Yuri Babenko (born 1978), Russian professional ice hockey player
- Vitaly Atyushov (born 1979), Russian ice hockey defenceman
- Yuri Dobryshkin (born 1979), Russian ice hockey player
- Alexei Kosourov (born 1979), Russian professional ice hockey player
- Igor Lukashin (born 1979), Russian diver; won the gold medal at the 2000 Summer Olympics
- Timur Rodriguez (born 1979), Russian showman, singer, TV and radio personality
- Pavel Volya (born 1979), Russian TV host, actor and singer
- Dimitri Altaryov (born 1980), Russian professional ice hockey winger
- Yevgeniya Bochkaryova (born 1980), Russian gymnast
- Natalya Sutyagina (born 1980), Russian butterfly swimmer

==== 1981–1990 ====
- Andrei Kuzmin (born 1981), Russian ice hockey player
- Sergei Kuchmasov (born 1981), Belarusian springboard diver
- Viktor Burayev (born 1982), Russian race walker
- Dmitry Kokarev (born 1982), Russian chess player
- Alexei Medvedev (born 1982), Russian professional ice hockey forward
- Stanislav Zhmakin (born 1982), Russian ice hockey winger
- Yelena Dembo (born 1983), Greek chess player
- Sergei Ageyev (born 1984), Russian ice hockey goaltender
- Natalia Lavrova (1984–2010), Russian dual Olympic gold medalist
- Yevgeni Popov (born 1984), Russian cyclist
- Nadezhda Bazhina (born 1987), Russian diver
- Vladimir Galchenko (born 1987), Russian juggler
- Yekaterina Lisina (born 1987), Russian basketball player
- Oleg Vikulov (born 1987), Russian platform diver
- Roman Lyuduchin (born 1988), Russian professional ice hockey forward
- Sergei Andronov (born 1989), Russian professional ice hockey player
- Pavel Medvedev (born 1989), Russian professional ice hockey player
- Olga Galchenko (born 1990), Russian juggler

==== 1991–2000 ====
- Denis Ablyazin (born 1992), Russian artistic gymnast
- Egor Kreed (born 1994), Russian rapper and singer-songwriter
- Anton Slepyshev (born 1994), Russian professional ice hockey player
- Aleksandr Kalyashin (born 1995), Russian football defender
- Ziyat Paigin (born 1995), Russian professional ice hockey defenceman
- Maria Astashkina (born 1999), Russian swimmer
- Klim Kostin (born 1999), ice hockey player

== Lived in Penza ==
- Alexandr Aksakov (1832–1903), Russian writer, translator, journalist, editor, state official and psychic researcher
- Nikolai Ishutin (1840–1879), Russian utopian socialist; was raised in Penza
- Aristarkh Lentulov (1882–1943), Russian avant-garde artist of Cubist orientation; studied art in the Penza art school
- Alexandr and Mariya Dmitriev, the couple who owns a pet cougar named Messi

== See also ==
- List of Russian people
- List of Russian-language poets
