= List of Heroes of the Russian Federation (M) =

This is a list of people who have been awarded the title Hero of the Russian Federation.

It has been awarded more than 970 times, of which more than 440 were posthumously.

== List of Heroes of the Russian Federation ==
- Aleksandr Mavrin (ru)
- Abdulmalik Magomedov (ru)
- Akhmed Magomedov (ru)
- Dibirgadzhi Magomedov (ru)
- Adilgerey Magomedtagirov
- Igor Madenov (ru)
- Vitaly Mayboroda (ru)
- Nikolai Maydenov (ru)
- Nikolai Mayorov (ru)
- Leonid Makarenkov (ru)
- Vadim Makarov (ru)
- Nikolai Makarov
- Nikolai Makarovets (ru)
- Vladimir Makeev (ru)
- Vladimir Maksakov (ru)
- Vladimir Maksimchuk (ru)
- Mikhail Malakhov (ru)
- Yuri Malenchenko
- Igor Malikov (ru)
- Mikhail Malofeev
- Oleg Malochuev (ru)
- Akhmed Malsagov
- Aleksandr Margelov (ru)
- Vitaly Marienko (ru)
- Viktor Markelov (ru)
- Anton Marchenko (ru)
- Vladimir Marchenko (ru)
- Igor Marenkov (ru)
- Aleksandr Maslov (ru)
- Dmitry Maslov (ru)
- Ivan Maslov (ru)
- Sergey Maslov (ru)
- Viktor Matveev (ru)
- Vyacheslav Matveev (ru)
- Vyacheslav Matvienko (ru)
- Aleksey Matiyasevich (ru)
- Igor Matkovsky (ru)
- Aleksandr Matovnikov
- Aleksandr Makhlay (ru)
- Aleksey Makhotin (ru)
- Dmitry Medvedev
- Sergey Medvedev (paratrooper) (ru)
- Sergey Medvedev (border guard) (ru)
- Igor Medoev (ru)
- Vladimir Mezokh (ru)
- Sergey Melnikov (ru)
- Andrey Merzlikin (ru)
- Vasily Merkulov (ru)
- Igor Milyutin (ru)
- Mikhail Minenkov (ru)
- Dmitry Mironov (ru)
- Aleksandr Misurkin
- Yuri Mitikov (ru)
- Aleksandr Mikhailov (ru)
- Babu-Dorzho Mikhailov (ru)
- Vladimir Mikhailov
- Sergey Mikheev (ru)
- Ivan Milosevich (ru)
- Igor Mishin (ru)
- Aleksandr Moiseev
- Yuri Moiseev (ru)
- Igor Moldovanov (ru)
- Sergey Molodov (ru)
- Aleksandr Monetov (ru)
- Nikolai Monetov (ru)
- Igor Morev (ru)
- Andrey Morozov (ru)
- Sergey Morozov (ru)
- Stanislav Morozov (ru)
- Aleksey Morokhovets (ru)
- Mikhail Motsak
- Mikhail Mudrov
- Aleksandr Muravyov (ru)
- Rustam Muradov
- Khalid Murachuev (ru)
- Georgy Murzin (ru)
- Talgat Musabaev
- Tulpar Musalaev (ru)
- Rais Mustafin (ru)
- Oleg Mutovin (ru)
- Vener Mukhametgareev (ru)
- Timur Mukhutdinov (ru)
- Sergey Mylnikov (ru)
- Mikhail Myasnikov (ru)

== See also ==
- Awards and decorations of the Russian Federation
- Awards and Emblems of the Ministry of Defense of the Russian Federation
- Awards of the Ministry of Internal Affairs of Russia
- Awards of the Federal Security Service of the Russian Federation
- Awards of the Federal Protective Service of the Russian Federation
- Awards of the Ministry for Emergency Situations of Russia
- Honorary titles of Russia
