= Aleksey Khovansky =

Aleksey Khovansky may refer to:

- Aleksey Khovansky (fencer) (born 1987), Russian foil fencer
- Aleksey Khovansky (publisher) (1814–1899), Russian filolog and publisher
