= Dmitry Medvedev (disambiguation) =

Dmitry Medvedev (born 1965) is a Russian politician who served as president of Russia (2008–2012) and prime minister (2012–2020).

Dmitry Medvedev is also the name of:

- Dmitry Alexandrovich Medvedev (1918–1992), Soviet Air Force lieutenant general and hero of the Soviet Union
- Dmitry Gennadyevich Medvedev (1970–2005), Russian FSB officer and Hero of the Russian Federation
- Dmitry Medvedev (1981–2002), Russian serial killer; see Yuri Ustimenko and Dmitry Medvedev
- Dmitry Medvedev (partisan) (1898–1954), Soviet partisan movement leader

== See also ==
- Dmitri Mendeleev
