= Pavel Medvedev =

Pavel Medvedev may refer to:

- Pavel Medvedev (ice hockey, born 1989), Russian ice hockey player
- Pavel Medvedev (ice hockey, born 1992), Russian ice hockey player
- Pavel Spiridonovich Medvedev (1888–1919), Russian Bolshevik and executioner
- Pavel Medvedev (scholar) (1892–1938), Russian literary scholar
