= Arkady Davidowitz =

Russian writer (1930–2021)

- Аркадий Давидович
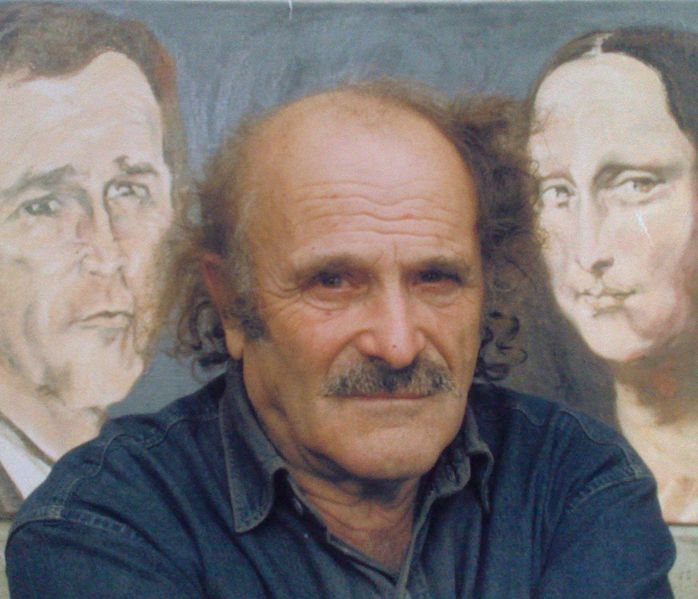
- Born: 12 June 1930; Voronezh, Russian SFSR, Soviet Union
- Died: 25 February 2021 (aged 90); Voronezh, Russian Federation
- Writing career
- Genre: Aphorisms

Arkady Davidowitz (Davidovich, Russian: Аркадий Давидо́вич), born Adolf Filippovich Freudberg (Russian: Адольф Филиппович Фрейдберг; 12 June 1930 – 25 February 2021) was a Russian writer and aphorist, author of over 50,000 published aphorisms.

== Biography ==
Davidowitz was born to a family of doctors – his father, Filipp Abramovich, was a venereologist, and mother, Raisa Solomonovna, a paediatrician. So by the aphorist's own admission, he was treated "first by Mum, then by Dad".

During the Soviet period, Davidowitz was published in the Krokodil magazine under the pseudonyms of Julius Caesar, Ernest Hemingway, Honoré de Balzac, and "French writer A. David" in the Smiles of All Sizes section, and his work included in many collections of aphorisms. Davidowitz financed the publication of his collection The Laws of Existence, Including Non-Existence in over twenty volumes.

In 1977, with friend and artist Valentina Zolotykh, the author founded in Voronezh a unique museum of aphoristics.

After the 2010 publication of the collection The End of the World Will End Well, Davidowitz began to be "recognised as an unrecognised genius" by an ever-widening group of people, which by summer 2012 had become a fan club. In October 2012, the club, under the aegis of, and with intellectual and material support from the Khovansky Foundation, launched a new educational project named The Aphorism as a Capital-Letter Word, promoting education through the learning of Davidowitz's aphorisms. On 21 March 2013, the project was officially affiliated to the Voronezh branch of the Moscow Institute of Humanities and Economics.

Davidowitz was a regular contributor to the Russian Humanist Society's Common Sense magazine.

Arkady Davidowitz was hospitalized due to a positive COVID-19 test on 7 February 2021, as a precautionary measure. Davidowitz died a few weeks later, on 25 February 2021, at age 90.

== Everyone's Day, or a Day to save everyone from everybody ==
February 29, 2020, on the Great leap Shabbath, Arcady Davidowitz appealed to the world community for the recognition of this day as a holiday uniting all people, regardless of race, religion, nationality, citizenship, profession or gender. As the writer noted, currently, there is not a single common holiday when everyone can wish each other well. For example, Christmas was once designed for absolute philanthropy, indiscriminately of nationality and religion, but led to a split even among Christians themselves. Even New Year is hardly suitable for a universal holiday, because the Chinese celebrate on other days, the Iranians, too, Buddhists and Jews in different ways. It would seem that Valentine's Day can be considered such a holiday, but on this day only those who love can wish each other well. And nobody wishes anything to those they do not love. But on EVERYONE'S DAY, even those who usually hate can wish each other well too.

== Oeuvre ==
Davidowitz's recent work has made him the most successful aphorist by quantity of aphorisms created. His most recent collections include An Anthology of Wisdom, An Anthology of Thought in Aphorisms, Russian Wisdom: from Vladimir Monomakh to the present day, The New Book of Aphorisms, and The Big Book of Aphorisms. By quantity of citations, Davidowitz by far surpasses authors such as Stanisław Jerzy Lec, Friedrich Nietzsche, Leo Tolstoy, Arthur Schopenhauer, and many others. In the words of Russian artist and society commentator Andrey Bilzho, "Davidowitz knows something about life which you, dear reader, and I do not."

The Davidowitz fan club's most ambitious project, Davidowitz's Decalingua, was officially launched on 29 May 2015, aiming to translate Davidowitz's latest collection, Je Suis Davidowitz, into ten world languages: English, Spanish, Hindi, Persian, Hebrew, Greek, Italian, Georgian, Polish and Hungarian. The idea of publishing the collection in ten languages was inspired by ten strings on Psaltery of King David and also by the Rosetta Stone, the discovery of which allowed for the restoration and interpretation of the Egyptian hieroglyphic system. By juxtaposing Davidowitz's aphorisms in ten different languages, of different language groups and families, it is possible to rediscover ancient, but anthropologically universal, modes of thinking. The collection was translated into English by students of the University of Bath (U.K.) on exchange at Voronezh State University: Pascal Cisse, Katie Taylor and Radha Patel.

== ٍSee also ==
- Stanisław Jerzy Lec

== Bibliography ==
- The End of the World Will End Well, 2012
- Je Suis Davidowitz, 2015
- Davidowitz Te Ching // 大卫的后裔德经 (达维多维奇格言录), 2020
