= Sergei Medvedev =

Sergei Medvedev may refer to:

- Sergei Medvedev (revolutionary) (1885–1937), Russian revolutionary, metalworker and trade union organizer
- Sergei Medvedev (footballer) (born 1973), Russian football player
- Sergei Medvedev (geologist), Soviet geologist who helped create the Medvedev–Sponheuer–Karnik scale
- Sergei Medvedev (writer), Russian scholar and Pushkin Book Prize winner
- Sergey Medvedev, Soviet/Russian journalist, television presenter and press secretary of Boris Yeltsin from 1995 to 1996
