= Filologicheskie Zapiski =

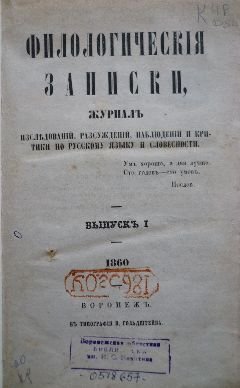
The first page of the first issue, 1860

Filologicheskie Zapiski (Филологические записки, i.e., "Annals of the Philologia", "Philological Notes") was the oldest Russian scientific journal "dedicated to research and development of various issues in language and literature in general - and comparative linguistics, Russian language and literature in particular - and Slavic dialects", published in Voronezh on an every second month basis between 1860 and 1917.

The magazine published articles by famous European philologists Max Müller, John Mill, William Whitney, Ernest Renan, Georg Curtius, August Schleicher, Carl Becker, Karl Heyse, Hippolyte Taine, Louis Léger, Johan Lundell as well as translations of ancient authors Theophrastus, Euripides, Lucian, Horace, Cicero, Virgil.

Numerous well-known individuals of the Russian Empire wrote pieces for the journal:

- Alexander Afanasyev,
- Fyodor Buslaev.
- Jan Niecisław Baudouin de Courtenay,
- Yakov Grot.
- Alexander Veselovsky,
- Izmail Sreznevsky etc.

"Philological Notes" made perhaps the most significant contribution to the practical translation of scientific texts on philology and general linguistics into Russian in the 19th century. Only four articles on these subjects had been translated into Russian before Alexey Khovansky began his work, and only one of these from English.

One of Khovansky’s first successes was the translation of Max Muller’s lectures at Oxford University. They were published in Russian in Voronezh only three years after their presentation at Oxford in 1863 – a speed which is amazing even in our times, not to mention the 19th century. In those years, the journal’s main direction of research was comparative linguistics, which served as the basis for Ethnology and Cultural Anthropology. One other translation from English was the work of William Whitney, the founder of the American linguistic school: “The Life and Growth of Language: An Outline of Linguistic Science”. In 1867, the journal published a translation of John Mill’s article "The Value of Art in the General System of Education".

Many articles in the magazine are unique. In the 19th century the magazine received the recognition not only throughout Russia but also at the universities of Paris, Leipzig, Prague, Zagreb, Berlin, Jena, Vienna, Uppsala, Strasbourg, and in America.

Prior to the organization in 1879 in Warsaw "Russian Philological Bulletin", the magazine remained the only special periodical in Russia devoted to the problems of philology and the teaching of Russian language and literature.

Founded by Alexei Khovansky in 1860, the journal was published regularly until 1917. Comparative linguistics was classified in the USSR as "bourgeois science," many scientists were persecuted. The magazine was closed down in 1917 but resurfaced many years later in 1993 at the Faculty of Philology of Voronezh State University.
