= Exotic pet =

Non-domesticated animal rarely kept as pet

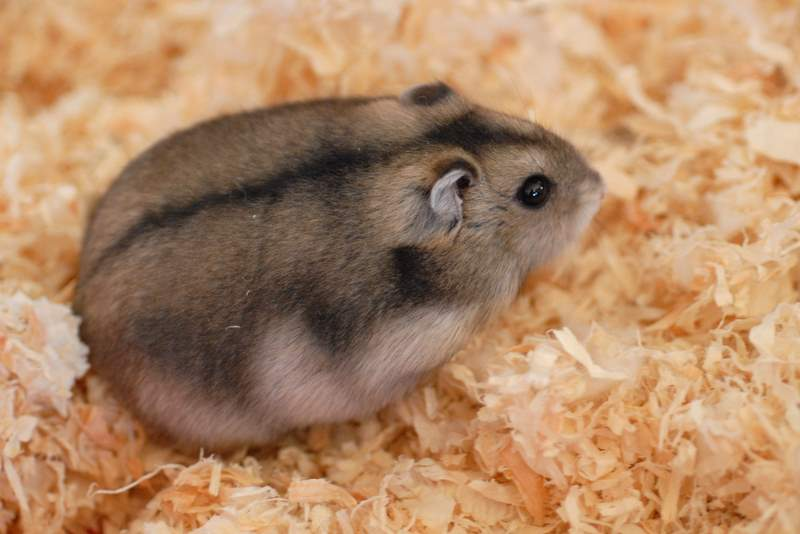
Dwarf hamsters are among the relatively low-risk exotic animals kept as pets.

An exotic pet is a pet which is relatively rare or unusual to keep, or is generally thought of as a wild species rather than as a domesticated pet. The definition varies by culture and location, and over time, as a given species becomes firmly enough established in the world of animal fancy, it may no longer be considered exotic.

== Definitions ==
The definition is an evolving one; fish, rabbits, and some rodents and birds have become firmly enough established in the world of animal fancy as to no longer be considered exotic in general usage, though they may still be classed as exotic in veterinary practice. Sometimes any unique or wild-looking pet (including common domestic animals such as the ferret and the rat) is considered an exotic pet.

"Exotic" often refers to a species which is not native or indigenous to the owner's locale, and "pet" is a companion animal living with people. However, many use the term to include native species as well (e.g., snakes may sometimes be considered exotic as pets even in places where they are found in the wild), especially ones with a unique appearance. The international organization the American College of Zoological Medicine recognizes "zoological companion animals" as a veterinary speciality, and this term is used by veterianry professionals to indicate an exotic pet. Legally, the definition is subject to local jurisdiction.

=== In the United States ===
In the United States, the Code of Federal Regulations (9 CFR 1.1), says that the term pet animal means "any animal that has commonly been kept as a pet in family households in the US, such as dogs, cats, guinea pigs, rabbits, and hamsters", and further says that (emphasis added) "This term excludes exotic animals and wild animals." It defines exotic animal, in part, as "[An animal] that is native to a foreign country or of foreign origin or character, is not native to the United States, or was introduced from abroad."

== Private zoos ==
When a person owns a collection of enough exotic pets, the property that they keep the animals on may be operated as a private zoo or a menagerie. As with exotic pets in general, laws about private zoos varies by country, state, county, and territory. A private zoo can range in size from a few acres to hundreds of acres and can have as many as a few to hundreds of exotic animals. Which people are allowed to view and interact with the animals depends on the owner. Because it usually requires a great deal of financial support for displaying exotic animals which are uncommon, difficult to acquire, and expensive to maintain in a living and active state, private zoos are at times seen as a status symbol that upper class people can use to illustrate their power and wealth.

In the criminal underworld, crime bosses and drug lords are also known to have private zoos, in order to show how successful they have become in organized crime. In such zoos, there are also allegations that the criminals have been known to use the zoo animals to murder captives in damnatio ad bestias-like killings. A well-known example is Pablo Escobar's zoo, Hacienda Nápoles. One of the dangers of private zoos is the damage and harm that the animals can pose to people if they escape or are released by the owner.

According to some advocacy groups such as REXANO (Responsible Exotic Animal Ownership) the ownership of exotic pets and private zoos can be both ethical and beneficial to wildlife. REXANO claims that captive breeding of exotic pets in zoos has saved many animals from extinction by providing a supply of captive-bred animals to reduce pressures on wild populations, thus helping to conserve them in their natural environments. REXANO also argues that close personal contact with wild animals can help promote their conservation among people, and because of this, venues such as circuses, fairs and private zoos are good for both people and wildlife. There are also private zoo owners who claim that their zoos also serve as animal rescue sanctuaries.

Other advocacy groups argue that private zoos do more harm than good to wild animal populations. The Association of Zoos and Aquariums (AZA) has called private zoos a "malignancy" and claims that these places exploit charismatic species for profit. The AZA is especially opposed to private ownership of big cats such as tigers, claiming that such owners allow tigers to be inbred or to have mutant genes, which brings the species closer to extinction. People for the Ethical Treatment of Animals (PETA) criticizes these places as "animal prisons," accuses them of acquiring animals discarded from other private owners, and advises its members on how to avoid them. World Animal Protection also advises against visiting private zoos and has criticized the province of Ontario for failing to regulate against exotic animal ownership, alleging that any owner of exotic animals is technically able to open a zoo.

== Issues ==
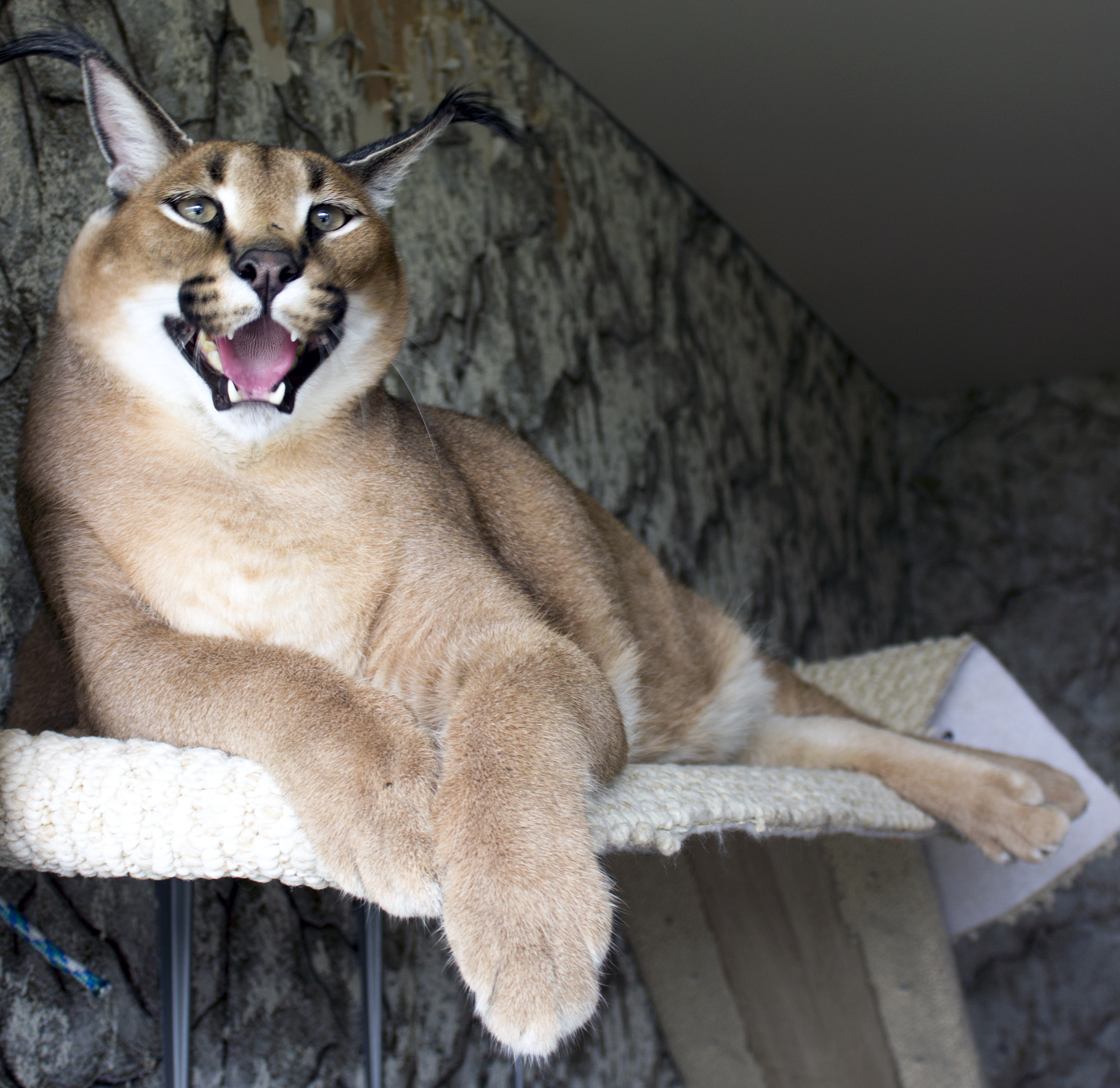
A caracal owned as a pet in Russia.

=== Legality ===
The Convention on the International Trade in Endangered Species of Wild Flora and Fauna, or CITES, moderates the trade of some exotic pets around the world, to prevent any threats to their survival and ecological damage. Certain animals may be strictly regulated or restricted outright due to both their conservation status, as well as the possibility of the animal becoming an invasive species.

The USDA issues permits for keeping and breeding certain exotic species, whether captured from the wild or bred. In the United States, for example, it is illegal to import primates for the pet trade, but animals bred in captivity exist in the trade, using animals descended from those brought in legally before the ban was enacted. As of September 2014, most US states forbid or regulate the possession of exotic pets, but 5 states have no license or permit requirements.

In 2003, the US Captive Wild Animal Safety Act (CWASA) became law, and in September 2007 the US Fish and Wildlife Service enacted rules to enforce it. The law bans the sale or transport of big cats across state lines for the pet trade, and applies to cheetahs, cougars, jaguars, leopards, clouded leopards, snow leopards, lions, tigers, and their hybrids.

=== Trafficking ===
Illegally transporting exotic pets is also known as wildlife smuggling, and the industry generates an estimated $7 to $23 billion each year.

While there are many ways that live animals are smuggled across borders, there are often heavy losses due to the methods of transportation; many species of small animals can be piled into tiny, and usually airtight, containers and often die as a result. In one example of smuggling, slow lorises trafficked from Indonesia have their teeth removed prior to being sold locally, or exported to Japan or Russia. The animals are not given any pain relievers during their surgeries.

International treaties (such as CITES) have been established to combat the illegal sale and transport of vulnerable animals and plants, but failure to properly enforce these regulations leave many loopholes for the illegal trade to continue. For example, the United States has both signed CITES during its creation as well as created its own national laws against the import and sale of elephant ivory, but as of 2008 it was found to be the second largest importer of it behind China.

=== Impact on the world ===
With the advent of open water sailing in the 15th century and increase in exotic pet popularity in the 20th century US, the exotic pet trade grew to higher amounts than ever before. This came at the detriment of driving the destruction and extinction of animals in the wild. This continues to hold true today: one of the major factors behind the status of the slow loris is the fact it is often kept locally as a pet, or traded to Japan.

Social media has influenced the increase of exotic animals being traded. Many videos online depict exotic animals being kept in a domestic environment, influencing more people to consider adopting exotic pets. However, these videos are mostly distorted and do not acknowledge the several negative side effects that come with owning an exotic pet.

=== Health ===
Veterinary costs for treatment of exotic animals may be significantly higher than for a more conventional pet, owing to the increased specialization required.

Zoonotic disease is known to occur in a small number of exotic pets. The American Veterinary Medical Association, the US Department of Agriculture, the National Animal Control Association, the American Zoo and Aquarium Association and the CDC all discourage the private ownership of certain exotic animals.

In the UK, voluntary organizations such as the "NCRW" (National Centre for Reptile Welfare) and "SEEPR" (South East Exotic Pet Rescue) take in unwanted, ill, or lost exotic animals and nurse them back to full health before rehoming them.

=== Husbandry ===
Providing appropriate environmental conditions, housing and diet for an exotic animal may be difficult for several reasons:

- insufficient information may be available on caring for such animals in captivity, though this is rapidly changing.
- adequate housing may be difficult and expensive to procure or build. This is usually only a problem for large or highly active animals that need a large amount of space.
- it may be difficult to provide the correct environment (such as temperature or amount of sunlight)
- feeding the correct diet may be difficult or impossible
- providing the right social environment for highly social species may be impractical or impossible in a home setting.
- licensing may be required for the owning or breeding of some exotic animals. Most US states and municipalities, for example, regulate exotic pet ownership.

However, captive care and husbandry information for many commonly kept amphibians, reptiles, birds, and small exotic mammals are widely available through literature, animal enthusiast groups, and Internet websites and discussion forums.

For example, capybaras (Hydrochoerus hydrochaeris) are sometimes kept as exotic pets, but welfare studies show they require a semi-aquatic environment with large water access, stable social groups, and adequate space, conditions that many private owners cannot provide. Attempts to house capybaras in isolated or small enclosures have been associated with elevated stress, aggression, and poor health outcomes.

=== Risk to humans ===
Exotic animals retain their unpredictable wild nature, with some being physically capable of maiming or killing their owners. Mammals are the most likely exotic pets to injure or kill humans, with non-human primates topping the list.

Even if they are bred for the pet trade and raised by humans, they may be unpredictable, relatively resistant to training; in some cases, especially as full-grown adults, they can be dangerous. Injuries to humans may be relatively common, but reported yearly deaths due to exotic pet ownership are rare. Statistics compiled by an advocacy organization indicate a yearly average of less than 3.5 fatalities per year in the United States; and another lists 87 exotic animal incidents resulting in human death from June 20, 1990, to April 15, 2016.

=== Primates ===
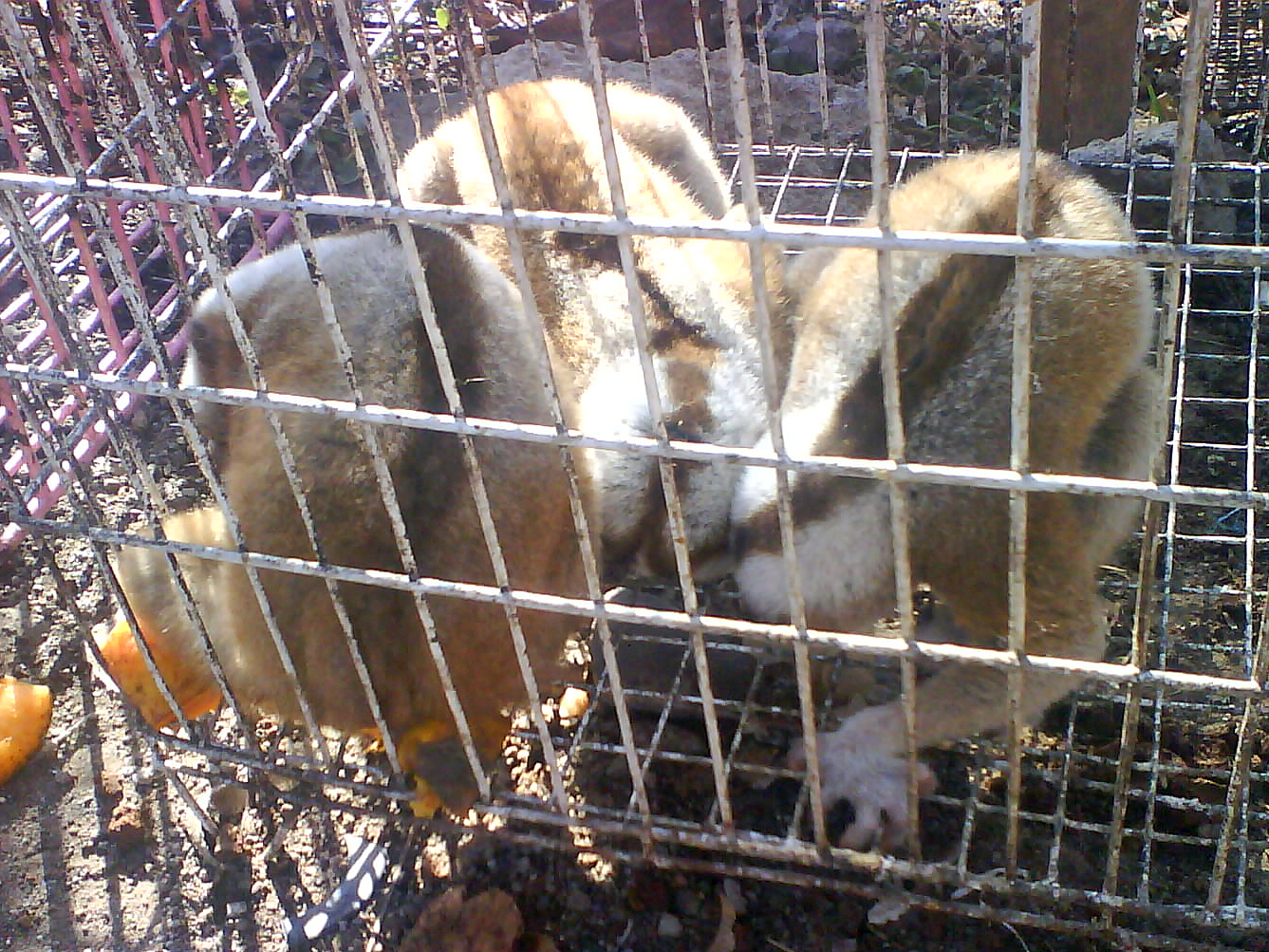
Animal markets in impoverished, tropical countries often sell primates to both tourists and locals as pets, such as these slow lorises, despite laws against the trade.

It has been estimated that as many as 15,000 primates are kept by private individuals as pets in the United States. In the United States, most states restrict monkey ownership, either via bans or strict licensing requirements, but, as of 2016, 13 states do not.

The European Union, the Netherlands, Bulgaria, Italy, Portugal, Latvia, Lithuania, Estonia and Hungary have bans on the keeping of primates. In the United Kingdom, primate ownership is strictly limited via licensing.

In 1975, the Center for Disease Control prohibited the import of primates into the US for use as pets. The breeding industry uses descendants of animals imported before 1975. Non-human primates of various species, including those listed as endangered, such as cottontop tamarins, baboons, chimpanzees, Diana monkeys, lemurs and gibbons can still be found for purchase, largely online. Even in areas where keeping primates as pets is illegal, the exotic pet trade continues to prosper and some people keep primates as pets. As primates grow, so does their strength and aggression; some owners and others interacting with the animals have lost fingers and suffered severe facial damage among other injuries sustained in attacks.

The general consensus among veterinarians, zoologists, primatologists and other experts is that primates do not make suitable pets, as their complex emotional and social needs and other highly specialized requirements are too difficult to meet by the average owner.

Although the breeding population has been largely isolated from wild populations outside the US, they still have the potential to transmit zoonotic disease. There is a risk of Herpes B virus from macaques. Research workers have died from this disease contracted from non-human primate research subjects. Additionally, there is considerable risk to the non-human primate pet through transmission of human disease. One such example is herpes simplex virus, which can be deadly to certain smaller monkeys.

== Common small exotic pets ==
Small exotic pets include marsupials like Chacoan pygmy opossums and sugar gliders, as well as other mammals like ferrets, hedgehogs and flying squirrels. North American opossums are sometimes kept as pets. More common animals like rabbits are not considered exotic. Small non-mammalian animals such as reptiles, birds, fish, and amphibians—e.g. lizards, snakes, turtles, goldfish, canaries, frogs and axolotls—are kept as pets.

Many small exotic pets are prohibited in certain areas for being invasive; California, Hawaii, and New Zealand have strict regulations to protect their native environments and agricultural operations. Ferrets, sugar gliders, and hedgehogs have various prohibitions on their ownership.

=== Ferrets ===
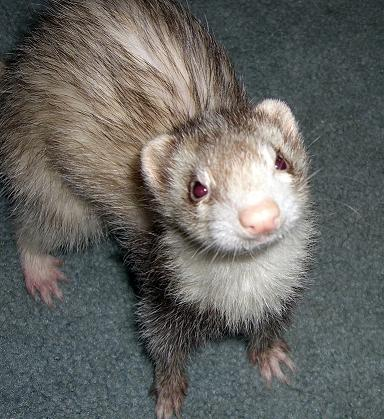
Female ferret

Ferrets have a high metabolic rate, meaning they can eat around 8 to 10 small meals daily. They are carnivorous, like cats, so they need a high protein intake which can be satisfied using pellets. Chicken and lamb are common ingredients in ferret food, it is best to avoid foods that include grain or corn. Domestic ferrets live in cages, but should be let out for several hours each day. Domestic ferrets enjoy having many places to hide and explore, such as tunnels and closed hammocks. Some ferrets may also enjoy playing in water. As natural predators, ferrets should be kept separate from any prey animals. Like many other "pocket pets", ferrets are social animals and thrive in groups of two or three. A ferret kept on its own will require more attention from its owner than a ferret who has the constant company of his own species. Female ferrets reach sexual maturity at around 8 –12 months of age. A ferret gives birth to an average of 8 kits; gestation lasts about 41 days.

=== Sugar gliders ===
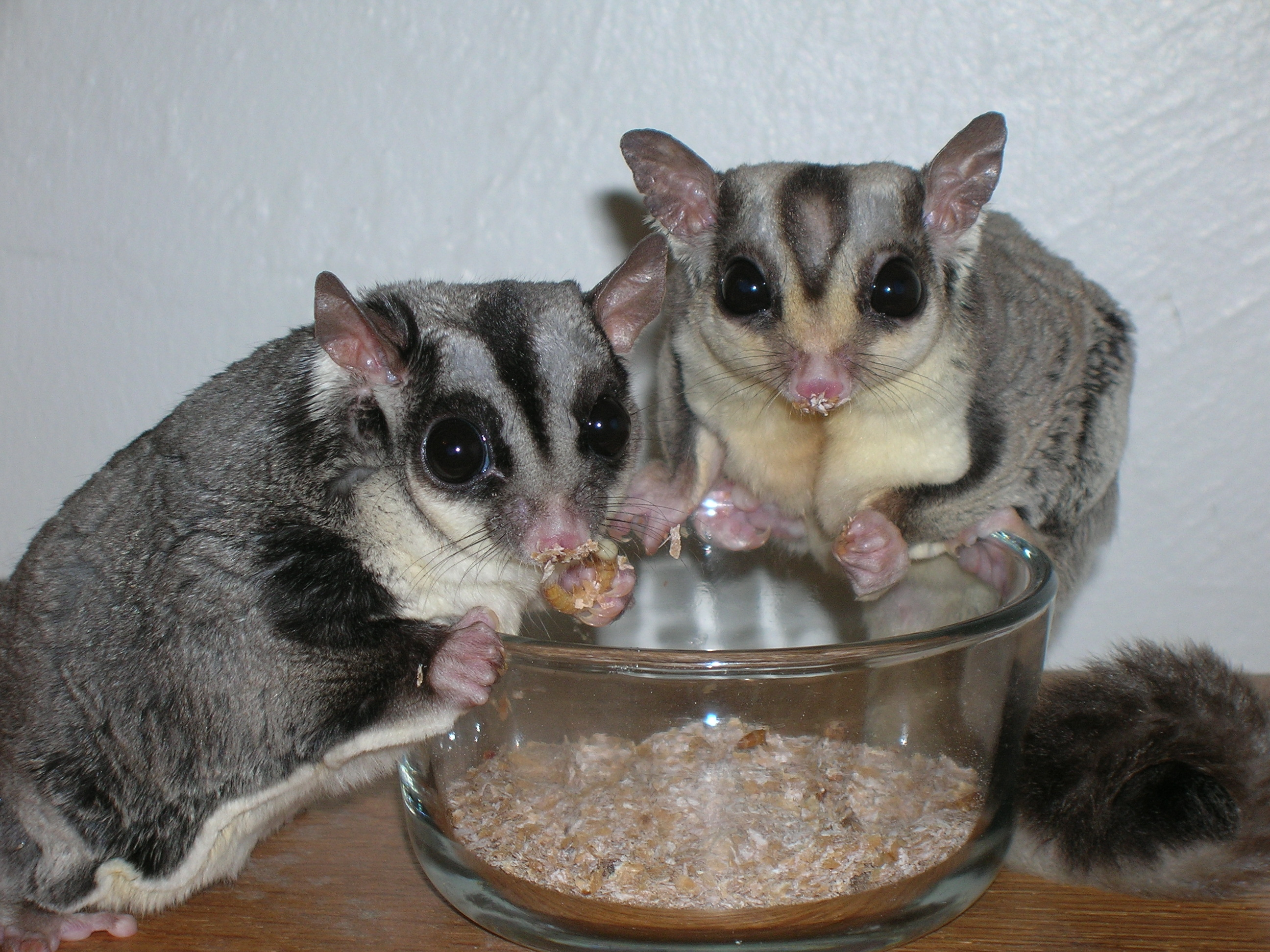
Sugar gliders eating mealworms

Around the world, the sugar glider is popular as an exotic pet, and is sometimes considered a pocket pet. Most US states and cities allow sugar gliders as pets, with some exceptions including California, Hawaii, Alaska, and New York City. In Australia, sugar gliders can be kept in Victoria, South Australia, and the Northern Territory. However, they are not allowed to be kept as pets in Western Australia, New South Wales, the Australian Capital Territory, Queensland or Tasmania.

Sugar gliders are social animals commonly living in groups of around 7 individuals. They communicate through vocalization and chemical odors and commonly live in trees. Male gliders become mature at 4–12 weeks and female gliders mature at 8–12 weeks. Breeding takes place in June to November and the glider gives birth to one child, or joey, although having twins is possible. The joey spends 2 months in the pouch only opening its eyes 80 days after birth. Male gliders do all the parental care and after 110 days the joey is ready to leave the nest. Sugar gliders are omnivorous relying on the consumption of insects in the summer. Gliders can also eat arthropods, sap, honeydew, and nectar from plants. Sugar gliders eat around 11 grams of food a day, 10 percent of their body weight.

=== Hedgehogs ===
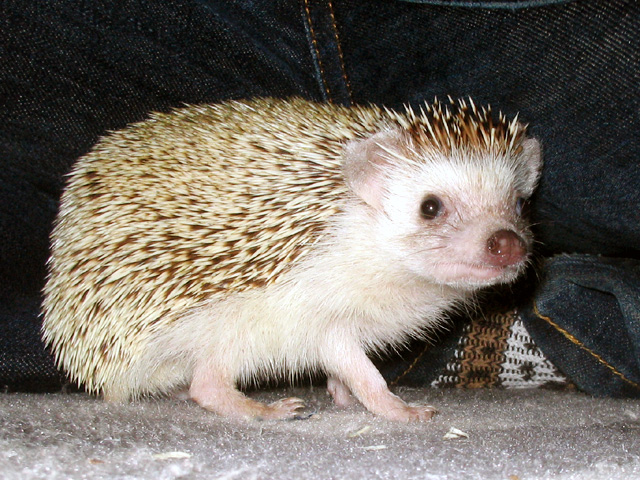
A pet hedgehog from Japan

Seventeen species of hedgehog exist worldwide. Hedgehogs are native in Europe, the Middle East, Africa, and central Asia. They were introduced to New Zealand by England and quickly became an invasive species. Hedgehogs are omnivorous and threaten insect, snail, lizard, and bird populations due to a lack of natural predators in New Zealand. Hedgehogs may tighten the orbicularis muscle (a circular muscle structure similar to a sphincter) on their back to hide their head, legs, and belly in a coat of prickly erect spines. Hedgehogs are primarily nocturnal, though some may be crepuscular. Hedgehogs typically take refuge in the empty burrow of another small animal, or a burrow they dug themselves. However, hedgehogs can occasionally take refuge under rocks or in thick vegetation, or anywhere dark and secluded. Hedgehogs tend to be solitary, though not to the extent of hamsters. Some captive bred females crave the companionship of another hedgehog and occasionally show bonding tendencies when housed with another female; male hedgehogs should not be housed together as they will fight once they reach sexual maturity.

Hedgehogs were considered insectivores but now classified as omnivorous, having been known to eat bugs, slugs, frogs, fish, worms, small mice, small snakes, and even fruits and vegetables. A hedgehog's diet should be very high in protein. Hedgehogs can eat fruits and vegetables but only in moderation. Despite their small size, hedgehogs require a large cage with bedding and plenty of furniture to hide in and explore. Hedgehogs have a gestation period of about 35 days, and give birth to, on average, 4 deaf and blind young hoglets. At three to five weeks old the young leave the nest for the first time to go hunting on their own. Usually, there is no need for special treatment and care and the hoglets are mature enough to eat some solid material after two to three weeks.

== See also ==
- Pet culture
- Feral
- Canned hunt
- Baiting (blood sport)
- Wildlife smuggling
- Charismatic megafauna
- Exotic felids as pets
