= The Davidowitz Museum of Aphoristics =

Private museum

- Музей афористики Аркадия Давидовича
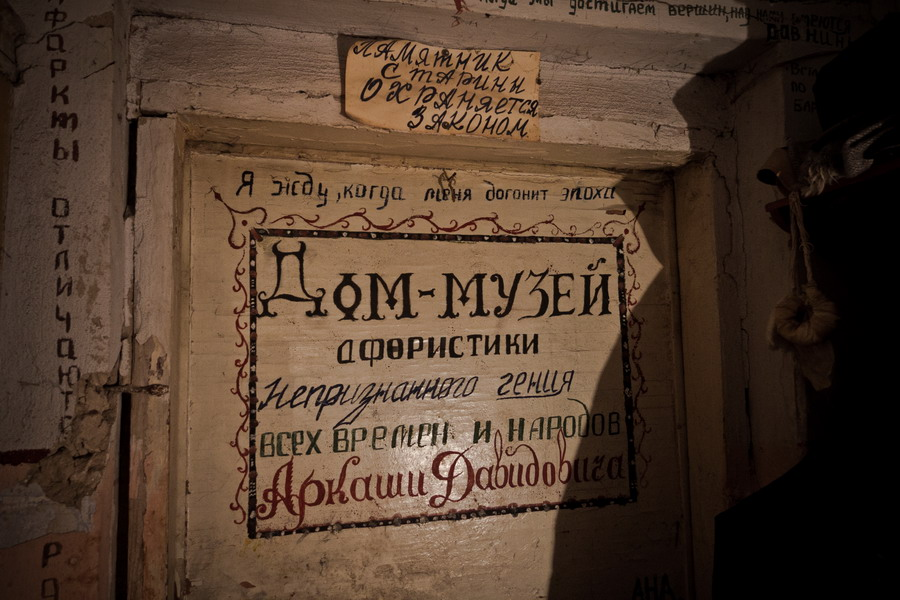
- Established: 1977
- Location: Voronezh, Sacco and Vanzetti street, 73

The Davidowitz Museum of Aphoristics is a private literary and art museum; the first and only museum of briefly-expressed thoughts in the world.

== History ==
The museum was founded in 1977 by the aphorism writer Arkady Davidowitz and the artist Valentina Zolotykh, whose paintings illustrate for the author's books. Davidovitz was one of the authors of the popular magazine Krokodil, but Soviet censorship forbade the publication of many of his aforisms because of their sharp satirical content. Then Valentina Zolotykh began to write these forbidden aphorisms on the walls of the studio apartment. Thus began the history of the museum of forbidden aphоristics.

== Building ==
The museum is located in the old part of Voronezh, at number 73 along Sacco and Vanzetti street. The house was built in 1953 by German prisoners of war. The museum preserves the bohemian interior of the era of the real socialism of the 1970s. The development of a virtual museum of aphoristics began in 2020, due to the COVID-19 pandemic.

== Collection ==
The museum's funds contain more than 50,000 items, including manuscripts and books, furniture and personal belongings of the writer, as well as paintings and sketches by Valentina and Anna Zolotykh.
