= Exotic felids as pets =

Type of exotic pet

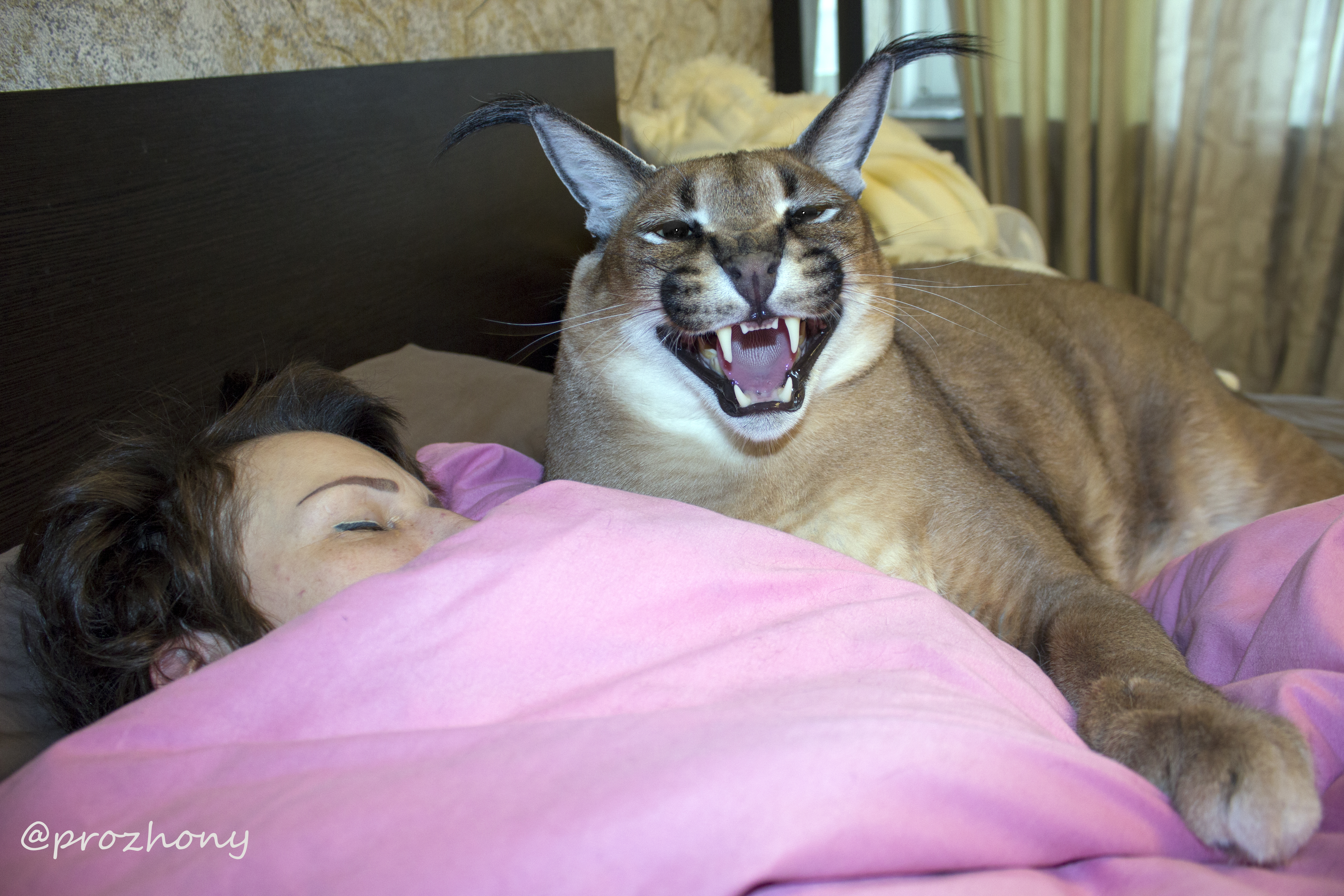
A pet caracal laying next to its owner

A pet exotic felid, also called pet wild cat or pet non-domestic cat, is a member of the family Felidae (excluding the house cat and hybrids thereof) kept as an exotic pet.

== Definition and differentiations ==
Hybrids of the domestic cat with non-domestic species (e. g. the Bengal cat or the Savannah cat) are not normally considered wild cats. While this distinction is often overlooked in the media and in the public eye, such cat breeds (especially the F5 and subsequent generations) are much closer to the domestic cat in terms of housing and husbandry requirements, behavior, and legality.

Unlike many other exotic pet species, wild cats usually cannot be kept indoors and require a large outdoor enclosure. This blurs the distinction between a wild cat being kept as an exotic pet and a private animal collection or menagerie. Usually, an enclosure meant for a pet exotic cat is built adjacent to the house in order to give the animal access into the living quarters.

Tame big cats kept by animal trainers (e. g. in circuses, private zoos or the film animal industry) are commonly mistaken for exotic pets. While the husbandry conditions and handling might be similar to a purely private setting, the common definition of a pet only includes animals kept for companionship or pleasure. Professional holders, breeders, or exhibitors do not meet this definition.

== History ==
Exotic felids have a long tradition in human care. The ancient Egyptians kept servals in the same role as the African wildcat (the wild ancestor of modern house cats). Cheetahs have also been kept throughout the world, both as companions and as hunting aides. Caracals have also been tamed and trained, primarily by Arabian and Asian rulers. Other large cats sometimes were also kept as companions, but were mostly limited to menageries owned by royal families. Large cats have been kept as pets for hundreds of years.

== Species reported in private ownership ==
A range of non-domesticated felids have been reported in private ownership, although prevalence varies widely by region and legal framework. In the United States, regulation of privately held big cats has historically varied by state, contributing to uncertainty about their numbers and distribution.

Reported species include:

- Small wild cat species such as the serval and caracal;
- Medium-sized species such as the ocelot and bobcat;
- Larger species including the cougar, cheetah, tiger, lion, leopard, and jaguar.

Ownership of many of these species is restricted or prohibited in numerous jurisdictions.

== See also ==
- Exotic pet
- Feline Conservation Federation
- Lion taming
