= Messi (cougar) =

Cougar owned in Russia

- Species: Puma concolor
- Sex: Male
- Born: 30 October 2015 (age 10); Saransk, Mordovia, Russia
- Occupation: Pet; model; Internet celebrity
- Years active: 2017–present
- Known for: Being kept as a pet, his intelligence
- Owners: Alexandr Dmitriev; Mariya Dmitrieva
- Residence: Penza, Penza Oblast, Russia
- Named after: Lionel Messi

Messi (Russian: Месси; born 30 October 2015) is a pet cougar, model and Internet celebrity, owned by Russian couple Alexandr and Mariya Dmitriev. The Dmitrievs live with Messi in a two-story house on a large plot of land in Penza, Russia. Messi was bought from a local petting zoo in 2016. In 2017, the Dmitrievs started an Instagram account and a YouTube channel for Messi, which became popular by 2018 and continues to grow in subscribers.

== Early life ==
Messi was born in a zoo at Saransk, Russia. He was one of three newborn cougars at the zoo to be named after professional football players formerly from FC Barcelona; Messi was named after Lionel Messi, and the other two were named Suarez and Neymar. The cubs were given these names because Saransk was one of several cities proposed to host the 2018 FIFA World Cup in Russia. Messi was later sold to a petting zoo in Penza when he was three months old.

Messi was significantly smaller than other typical male cougars, and as the species is not native to Russia, he could not be released into the wild. Moreover, he was born in captivity and did not have a mother to teach him how to hunt. He had numerous other health problems as well, which rendered him unable to live in a zoo or wildlife sanctuary either. Therefore, workers at the petting zoo originally planned to euthanize him.

In 2016, Alexandr and Mariya Dmitriev visited the Penza zoo and met Messi for the first time. The couple experienced "love at first sight," and noticed Messi's exceptionally gentle personality. The Dmitrievs already had a sphynx cat named Kira but Aleksandr always wanted a big cat and so they considered bringing Messi home, offering a high price to the zoo authorities. “So we went to the zoo and started negotiations to buy Messi. We were surprised ourselves when they agreed", Mariya Dmitriev recalled in an interview with Caters News.

== Domestic life ==
When they first purchased Messi, Alexandr and Mariya Dmitriev lived in a small studio apartment in Penza. The hallway of the apartment was modified and was designated as Messi's play area. Messi uses toys such as empty bottles and balls. Messi has a gentle and calm personality, and has never attacked a person or another animal, though he sometimes hisses at people. The Dmitrievs sometimes refer to him as "kitten."

Messi is regarded by his owners as similar to a domestic dog. He has been trained at a local dog training facility and has learned around ten formal commands. The Dmitrievs walk Messi regularly using a leash, coat, and harness through various environments.

Messi is fed twice a day, and his diet mostly consists of raw turkey, beef, and chicken. It costs the Dmitrievs about 630 rubles per day to feed him. The couple regularly bathes Messi in a bathtub and sometimes trim his claws.

Messi is house-broken (trained) and prefers to stay inside when there is snow outside.

== Media attention ==
In 2017, the Dmitrievs started an Instagram account and YouTube channel for Messi, both called "I_am_puma". Pictures and videos published to these social media accounts show various aspects of daily life with the cougar. Messi's social media accounts quickly grew in popularity; by January 2018, the Instagram account already had almost 150,000 followers and over 50 million views. The Instagram account has more than 1.5 million followers; the YouTube channel has more than 2.6 million subscribers. Mariya is the manager of the social media accounts.

== Relations with other animals ==
Messi also shared the property and attention of the Dmitrievs with a 10-year-old female cheetah named Ichel, who was given to the Dmitrievs by a circus trainer in December 2019 and revealed in January 2020. Ichel died of lung cancer in April 2020.

The Dmitrievs own another female cheetah, named Gerda, who has a calm and gentle personality similar to Messi's. Messi becomes anxious when Gerda is present but relations between the two animals are improving. Gerda has her own YouTube channel, "I_am_cheetah".

The Dimitrievs also had another feline in their house, a female Sphynx cat (hairless breed) called Kira; she lived in the house with little interaction with Messi. In April 2021, Kira met Gerda, but became very anxious and avoided her enclosure afterwards. She died of a dilated cardiomyopathy later that month.

== Criticism ==
Despite mostly favorable attention on social media, some have criticized the Dmitrievs for keeping Messi under domestic circumstances. Opponents of the taming of wild animals fear that Messi's wild needs will not be met, and that once Messi reaches sexual maturity (he has since passed that mark) he may become more prone to dangerous behavior. They advise the Dmitrievs to send Messi to a wildlife reserve or sanctuary. The Dmitrievs, however, believe that Messi would not be able to survive in a wild setting, not least because he requires daily medication.

== See also ==
- Exotic felines as pets
- List of individual cats
