= The Khovansky Foundation =

Russian non-profit foundation

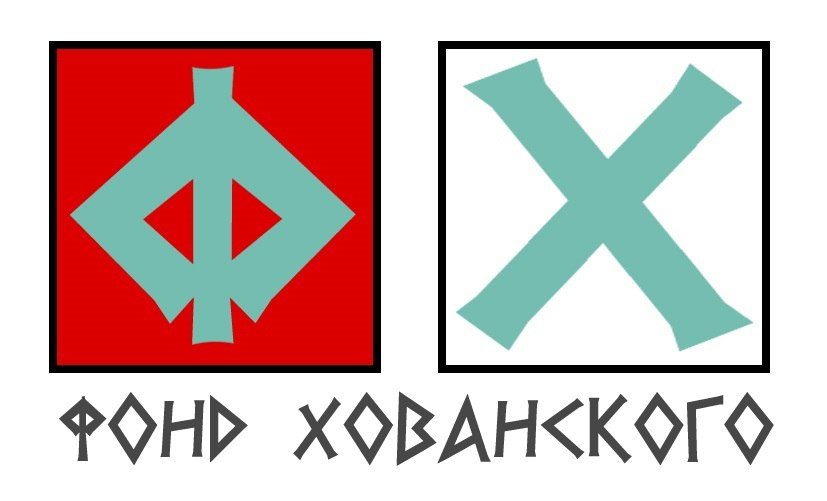

Establishment
  - established: 1899
  - reconstituted: 2009

The Khovansky Foundation (Russian: Фонд Хованского) is a non-profit organization, founded in Voronezh in 1899. It is financed by funds ownership and donations from the citizens and associations.

== Мotto ==
The motto of the foundation are the words of A. A. Khovansky: “The treasure of knowledge is invaluable, it also has the distinction, that the one who donate it doesn't lose it, moreover, a donating heer is also an acquisition — with the growing level of public education grow those who donate it.”.

== History ==
After the death of the publisher A. Khovansky (January 29, 1899) there was organized the Foundation and the Prize for the best teachers of philology and history.

In 1917, the Foundation and the magazine Filologicheskie Zapiski ceased its activities almost for a century.

The Khovansky-fund was reconstituted on the occasion of the 110th anniversary (November 4, 2009), again with the aim to support teachers and publishers.

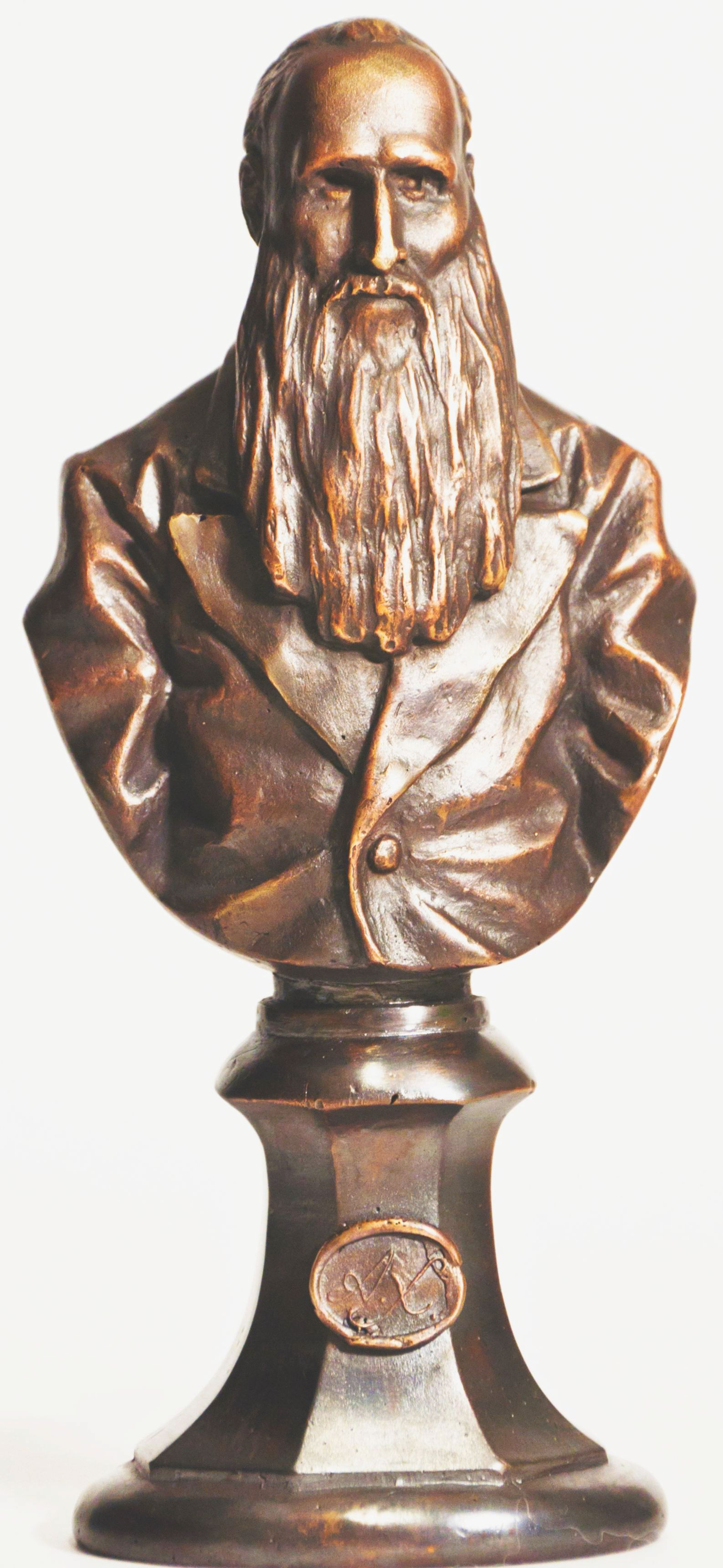
Khovansky statuette

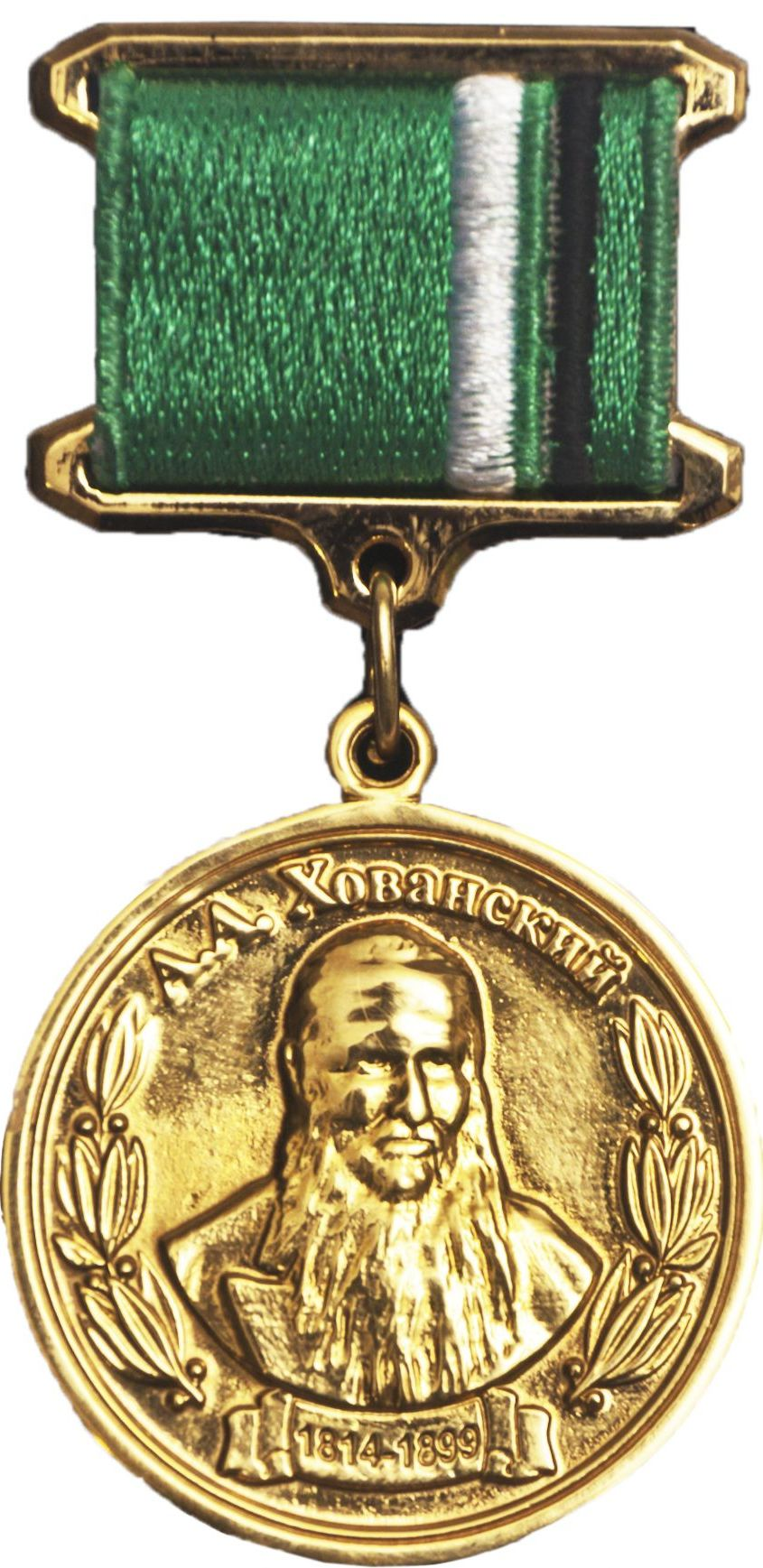
Khovansky medal

== Activities ==
The objective of the fund is to determine in special contest "The Living Word" the best teachers of languages and history in order to provide material support to winners.

Another purpose of the Fund is to recognize a special annual premium for publishers.

The Foundation carries out research in the areas of: comparative linguistics, comparative mythology, local history, ethnic and social psychology, psycholinguistics and semiotics.

== Рublications ==
- Metaphysics in education and linguistics
- Russophobia as a Way of Legitimizing Misantropy and a Step to Posttolerance

== Merit Awards ==
The Foundation has established new merit awards in commemoration of the 200th anniversary of Alexei Khovansky: medal "The Living Word" — for personal rewarding teachers of English and other languages and the statuette “Alexy” — for teaching and creative teams.

The "Living Word" medal has been awarded to several leading Russian academicians. In 2014, British translators Kit Bicket and Pascal Cissé became the first anglophone winners of the medal, for their work on a collection of essays on Russian and British heraldry and symbols The Semiotic Cycle: Signs of a Woman in Love. The collection was specially translated by the Khovansky Foundation as part of the 2014 UK/Russia Year of Culture.

Merit Awards recipients

- Jan van Steenbergen
