= Aleksei Medvedev =

Aleksei Medvedev may refer to:

- Aleksei Medvedev (footballer) (born 1977), Russian footballer
- Aleksey Medvedev (wrestler) (born 1972), Belarusian wrestler
- Alexei Medvedev (ice hockey) (born 1982), Russian ice hockey forward
- Aleksey Medvedev (cyclist) (born 1983), Russian cyclist
- Alexei Medvedev (politician) (1884–1937), a Soviet politician
- Aleksey Medvedev (weightlifter) (1927–2003), Soviet weightlifter
