= Vitaly Medvedev =

Vitaly Medvedev may refer to:

- Vitaly Medvedev (sprinter) (born 1977), Olympic sprint runner from Kazakhstan
- Vitaly Medvedev (fencer) (born 1983), Ukrainian Olympic fencer
