= Sergei Medvedev (footballer) =

Russian footballer

Personal information
- Full name: Sergei Viktorovich Medvedev
- Date of birth: 27 April 1973 (age 53)
- Height: 1.78 m (5 ft 10 in)
- Position: Defender

Senior career*
Years	Team	Apps	(Gls)
1992	FC Presnya Moscow	22	(0)
1992	FC Karelia Petrozavodsk	14	(1)
1993–1994	FC Asmaral Moscow	9	(0)
1993	→ FC Asmaral-d Moscow (loan)	7	(0)
1993	→ FC Asmaral Kislovodsk (loan)	18	(2)
1994	→ FC Asmaral-d Moscow (loan)	16	(0)
1996	FC Olimp Kislovodsk	30	(4)
1997	FC Luch Vladivostok	17	(0)
- * Club domestic league appearances and goals

Sergei Viktorovich Medvedev (Russian: Сергей Викторович Медведев; born 27 April 1973) is a former Russian football player.

== Club career ==
He made his Russian Premier League debut for FC Asmaral Moscow on 13 March 1993 in a game against FC Zhemchuzhina Sochi.

In September 1998, he came to a friend's wedding in Ingushetia. On the eighth day of the festivities, two cars flew up to Medvedev and took him prisoner to Chechnya. He stayed in captivity for 335 days and was released on August 30, 1998, thanks to his friend and former teammate Sergei Grishin, who ask to the Minister of Internal Affairs Sergei Stepashin.
