= Ahmed Malsagov =

Russian pilot

Ahmed Tatarkhanovich Malsagov
- Ахмед Татарханович Мальсагов
- Born: 1912; Altievsky, Ingushetia, Russian Empire
- Died: 14 January 1942 (Note: Some sources incorrectly report his date of death as 24 January because that was the day of the funeral and announcement); Varvarovka, Ukrainian SSR, Soviet Union
- Military career
- Allegiance: Soviet Union
- Branch: Soviet Air Force
- Service years: 1937–1942
- Rank: Major
- Nickname: "Mountain Eagle"
- Unit: 5th Short-range Bomber Aviation Regiment
- Conflicts: World War II
- Awards: Hero of the Russian Federation; Order of the Red Banner

Ahmed Tatarkhanovich Malsagov (Russian: Ахмед Татарханович Мальсагов, Ingush: Малсагнаькъан Татархана Ахьмад, romanized: Malsagnäqhan Tatarkhana Ah'mad; 1912 – 14 January 1942) was a Russian pilot in 5th Short-range Bomber Aviation Regiment during the Second World War who was killed in action. In 1995 he was declared a Hero of the Russian Federation.

== Prewar life ==
Malsagov was born in 1912 in the village of Altievsky in the Russian Empire to an Ingush family. In 1935 he joined the Red Army and in 1937 he graduated from the Stalingrad Military Aviation School. He became a member of the Communist Party in 1939. Before the start of the war, he was part of a bomber aviation regiment in the Western part of the USSR.

== World War II ==
During the German invasion of the Soviet Union Malsagov served in the 5th Short-range Bomber Aviation Regiment in the Odessa Military District. The regiment, originally equipped with Tupolev SBs, was soon provided with modern Petlyakov Pe-2 dive bombers right after the invasion. As a lieutenant he quickly mastered piloting the new aircraft and began making sorties on the Southern Front in June 1941, bombing a Romanian naval base, enemy tanks, and advancing troops. By 20 September 1941 he had made 65 sorties, and in the following winter, he distinguished himself after making 20 bombing sorties in the span of several days, for which he was awarded the Order of the Red Banner on 7 January 1942. Due to the precision of his bombing attacks, he was able to destroy ten tanks, five anti-aircraft guns, twenty-seven cars, and kill over 100 enemy infantrymen. On 14 January 1942 he was killed in action during a bombing mission and his funeral was held on 24 January. After the collapse of the Soviet Union he was declared a Hero of the Russian Federation in 1995.

== See also ==
- List of Heroes of the Russian Federation
