= Stanislav Zhmakin =

Russian ice hockey winger (born 1982)

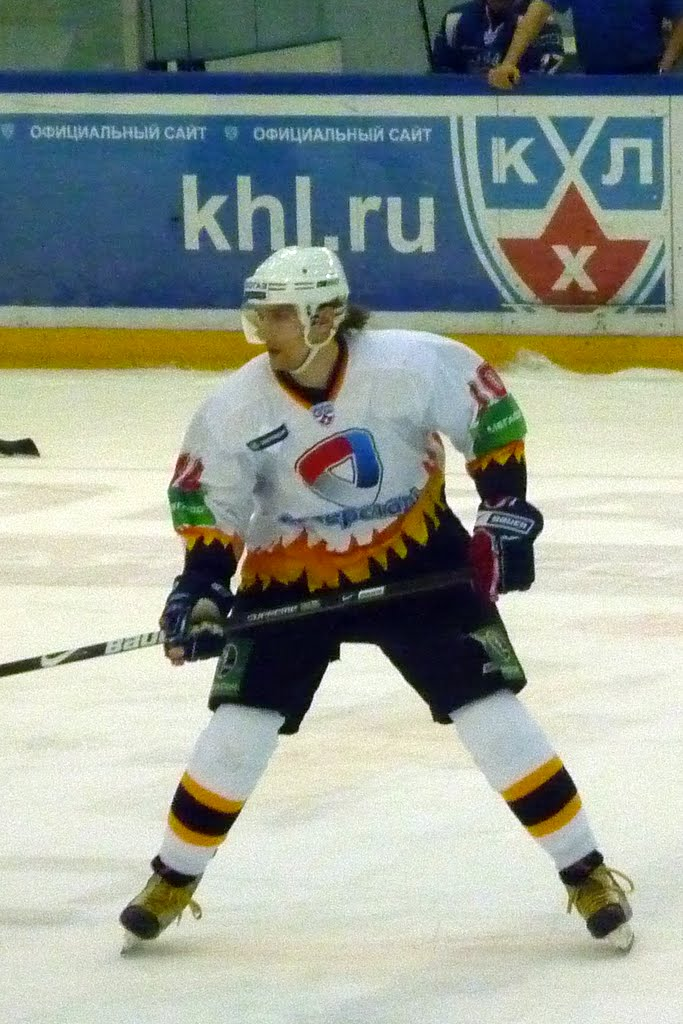
- Born: June 25, 1982 (age 43) Penza, Russian SFSR
- Height: 6 ft 1 in (185 cm)
- Weight: 196 lb (89 kg; 14 st 0 lb)
- Position: Right wing
- Shoots: Right
- KHL team Former teams: Yugra Khanty-Mansiysk; Lada Togliatti; Salavat Yulaev Ufa; CSKA Moscow; Avtomobilist Yekaterinburg; Severstal Cherepovets
- Playing career: 2001–present

Stanislav Zhmakin (born June 25, 1982) is a Russian ice hockey winger who current plays for Yugra Khanty-Mansiysk in the Kontinental Hockey League.

== Career statistics ==
			Regular season					Playoffs
Season	Team	League	GP	G	A	Pts	PIM	GP	G	A	Pts	PIM
2003–04	HC Lada Togliatti	RSL	38	5	6	11	22	—	—	—	—	—
2004–05	HC Lada Togliatti	RSL	7	0	0	0	0	—	—	—	—	—
2004–05	Salavat Yulaev Ufa	RSL	19	0	1	1	12	—	—	—	—	—
2005–06	HC Lada Togliatti	RSL	43	3	12	15	64	8	1	0	1	20
2006–07	HC Lada Togliatti	RSL	44	7	10	17	32	3	1	1	2	2
2007–08	HC Lada Togliatti	RSL	44	11	5	16	22	4	0	0	0	0
2008–09	HC CSKA Moscow	KHL	44	2	11	13	64	5	1	0	1	12
2009–10	Avtomobilist Yekaterinburg	KHL	37	12	4	16	20	4	2	0	2	2
2010–11	HC Severstal	KHL	38	9	6	15	40	—	—	—	—	—
KHL Totals			119	23	21	44	124	9	3	0	3	14

== Personal life ==
Zhmakin married Russian singer Daria Vodyahina in June 2010.
