= Pavel Medvedev (ice hockey, born 1992) =

Russian ice hockey player

- Born: January 8, 1992 (age 33); Moscow, Russia
- Height: 6 ft 1 in (185 cm)
- Weight: 181 lb (82 kg; 12 st 13 lb)
- Position: Forward
- Shoots: Left
- Ukraine team Former teams: HC Donbass; Spartak Moscow; HC Yugra; HC Sochi
- Playing career: 2009–present

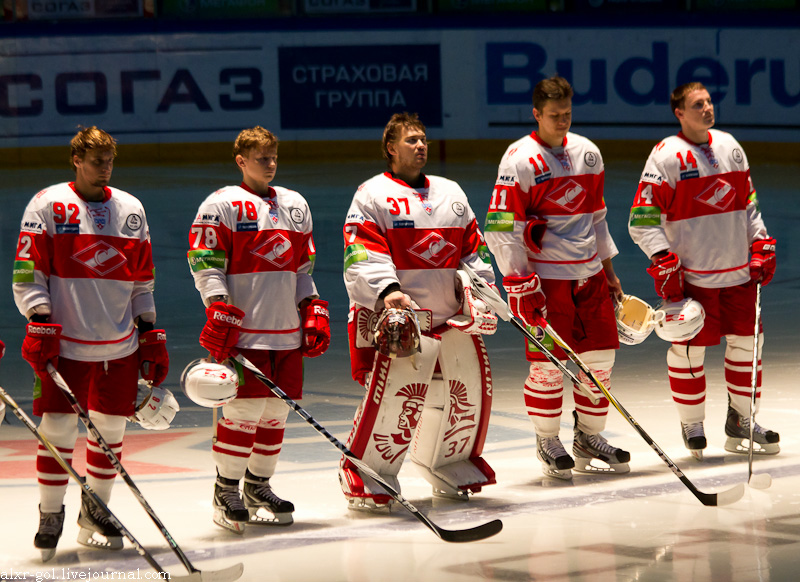
Starting at the left: Pavel Medvedev, Alexander Komaristy, Ivan Kasutin, Mikhail Zhukov, Štefan Ružička

Pavel Medvedev (born January 8, 1992) is a Russian professional ice hockey forward playing with HC Donbass in the Ukrainian Hockey League (Ukraine).

Medvedev made his KHL debut playing with HC Spartak Moscow during the 2011–12 KHL season. He has also appeared with HC Yugra and HC Sochi.
