= Mikhail Mudrov =

- Михаил Иванович Мудров
- Born: December 15, 1919; Gulushek village, Yeniseysk Governorate, RSFSR
- Died: January 29, 1944 (aged 24); Pogrebishche, Ukrainian SSR, USSR
- Burial place: Pogrebishche, Ukrainian SSR, USSR
- Military career
- Allegiance: Soviet Union
- Branch: Soviet Air Force
- Service years: 1938—1944
- Rank: Captain
- Conflicts: World War II
- Awards: Hero of the Russian Federation

Mikhail Ivanovich Mudrov (Russian: Михаил Иванович Мудров; December 15, 1919 — 29 January 1944) was a Soviet fighter pilot and flying ace during World War II. Due to initially being considered missing in action, he was not awarded the title Hero of the Soviet Union despite gaining over 20 solo shootdowns. Eventually, over 50 years after his death, on 10 April 1995, he was posthumously awarded the title Hero of the Russian Federation for his aerial victories.

== Biography ==
Mudrov was born on December 15, 1919 in a village in the Balakhtinsky District of Krasnoyarsk Krai. He completed school up until the 8th grade and would later graduate from the 30th Military Aviation Pilot School in Chita in 1938.

In 1940 Mudrov was promoted to the rank of Junior Lieutenant and sent to the 155th Fighter Aviation Regiment as a junior pilot. Then in 1941 he was enlisted as a pilot of the 3rd Fighter Aviation Regiment with the rank of Lieutenant. On June 20, 1943 he would achieve the rank of Captain.

During a combat mission on January 27, 1944, Mikhail Mudrov's plane was shot down (according to some sources, Captain Mudrov shot down two enemy aircraft in this final battle). The wounded pilot managed to land the plane on the ice of a pond near the town of Pogrebyshche in the Vinnytsia region of the Ukrainian SSR. The unconscious pilot was taken to the hospital, where he died on January 29, 1944. He was buried in Pogrebyshche.

== See also ==
- List of Heroes of the Russian Federation
