= Andrey Medvedev =

Andrey Medvedev may refer to:

- Andrei Medvedev (tennis) (born 1974), Ukrainian tennis player
- Andrey Medvedev (gymnast) (born 1990), Israeli artistic gymnast
- Andrei Medvedev (luger) (born 1993), Russian luger
- Andrey Aleksandrovich Medvedev (born 1996), former platoon commander from the Russian private military company Wagner Group
