= Yuri Ustimenko and Dmitry Medvedev =

Russian serial killer duo

Yuri Ustimenko
- Born: Yuri Kirillovich Ustimenko; 23 April 1981 (age 45); Leningrad Oblast, RSFSR, USSR
- Other names: "Predator"; Ilia Habarov "Ustimich"
- Conviction: Murder
- Penalty: Life imprisonment

Details
- Victims: 5–7 (2 jointly with Medvedev)
- Span of crimes: March – May 2002
- Country: Estonia
- States: Harju, Tartu, Ida-Viru
- Date apprehended: 8 May 2002
- Imprisoned at: Tartu Prison, Tartu, Tartu County

Dmitry Medvedev
- Born: May 1981; Leningrad Oblast, RSFSR
- Died: 5 May 2002 (aged 20–21); Valka, Valka Municipality, Latvia
- Cause of death: Ballistic trauma
- Other names: "Predator" "Medved"

Details
- Victims: 3 (2 jointly with Ustimenko)
- Span of crimes: March – May 2002
- Country: Estonia, Latvia
- States: Harju, Ida-Viru, Valka
- Date apprehended: N/A

Yuri Kirillovich Ustimenko (Russian: Юрий Кириллович Устименко, Estonian: Juri Ustimenko; born 23 April 1981) and Dmitry Medvedev (Russian: Дмитрий Медведев, Estonian: Dmitri Medvedev; May 1981 – 5 May 2002) were Russian serial killers operating in Estonia. They secretly arrived in Estonia over the Narva Reservoir in the autumn of 2001, after deserting a submarine school in St. Petersburg.

Both men murdered five people, but two of their victims managed to escape. Medvedev was killed by Latvian police in a firefight, but Ustimenko managed to escape. He was eventually captured in Poland for illegal border crossing and later identified by Interpol. He was extradited to Estonia, where he was sentenced to life imprisonment.

== Early lives ==
=== Yuri Ustimenko ===
Yuri Kirillovich Ustimenko was born on 23 April 1981 in the Leningrad Oblast, RSFSR, USSR, the younger of two brothers. His father abandoned the family in the early 1990s, leaving Ustimenko's mother to look after the children. Due to his skinny physique and short stature, Ustimenko was bullied by other students and became a social outcast, a problem further exacerbated by the fact that he verbally and physically abused by a relative, leading to him developing an inferiority complex.

During his free time, Ustimenko enjoyed reading books and poetry of various kinds, stating that among his favorites were Rafael Sabatini, Victor Hugo, Johann Wolfgang von Goethe, Vladimir Mayakovsky and others. He was also very well-read on the Stalinist Era and considered himself a patriot, with acquaintances claiming that he had a rhetorical gift that allowed him to convince others that he was always right.

=== Meeting Dmitry Medvedev and flight to Estonia ===
After graduating school in 1999, Ustimenko moved to Saint Petersburg, where he enrolled into the prestigious Saint Petersburg Naval Institute, where he met and quickly befriended another student, Dmitry Medvedev. Medvedev, who had recently been rejected by a girl, quickly grew attached to his new friend, following every suggestion and becoming heavily influenced by Ustimenko's viewpoints and character.

At around this time, a small organized criminal group formed among the cadets, led by a classmate of Ustimenko's named Andrey "Telepath" Telepin. From March to October 2001, Telepin's gang committed five murders with particular cruelty that caused a great public stir. While Ustimenko, Medvedev and another friend named Valentin Oleinikov were known to be closely associated and even knew about Telepin's crimes, no evidence indicated that they were personally involved.

In mid-2001, Ustimenko gave some money to Telepin after the latter suffered from financial difficulties. That same autumn, Telepin and his gang were put on a wanted list – shortly afterwards, Oleinikov deserted the Naval Institute, crossed the border into Estonia and settled in Sillamäe. A few days after his escape, Ustimenko and Medvedev followed suit – on 29 September, they left on leave, but instead of returning, they swam across the Estonian border via the Narva Reservoir. In order to cross, they utilized skills they had learned at the Naval Institute – they put on fins and masks, covered their bodies with black paint to be invisible in the water at night and carefully smeared their bodies with fat to prevent hypothermia. In the meantime, a criminal case was opened against both men for their desertion.

Later on, Ustimenko would claim that he and Medvedev initially planned to remain in the country until Telepin's trial concluded, and would eventually return to Russia and enroll back at the Naval Institute. However, he said that they gave up on the idea because Oleinikov convinced them both that they would endangered by the remainder of Telepin's gang. As such, the pair instead decided to move in with Oleinikov in Sillamäe, where they soon began to struggle financially due to the fact they were unable to find permanent work as illegal immigrants. For some time, they were supported by Oleinikov, but when he eventually started struggling as well, Ustimenko and Medvedev resorted to engaging in criminal activity.

In order to avoid getting caught, the duo always stuck together, traveled using only public transport and never used mobile phones.

== Crimes ==
On 18 March 2002, at 4:24 AM, a bomb exploded at the main door of a gun shop at Roosikrantsi 8 in Tallinn. After four minutes, another bomb blew up. The explosions injured two people, who were hit by glass. Witnesses saw two men running away from the event. Emergency workers who arrived at the site discovered a third, undetonated bomb, which was safely disposed of. Bomb defusal center manager Arno Pugonen thought that the bombs were meant to attack the Jagdwelt hunting supply store. Made by Predator was found written in black marker on the bomb. Subsequent to the arsenal of weapons taken from the store, five people were assassinated.

On 29 March, at around 21:00 PM, Ustimenko shot a 45-year-old taxi driver in the head on Filtri Road in Tallinn, killing him on the spot. He and Medvedev then stole 200 kroons and an old mobile phone. Two days later, on 31 March at 7:45 PM, the perpetrators entered a shop in Tartu, where Ustimenko used a shotgun to shoot the 51-year-old saleswoman, identified only by her first name "Galina", in the head. The criminals then stole around a thousand kroons from the cash register and fled.

In early April 2002, Ustimenko and Medvedev returned to Sillamäe, where they again asked Oleinikov for money, but this time, he refused and threatened to call the police if they ever showed up at his house again. The day afterwards, intent on eliminating all witnesses, the pair lured Oleinikov out of his house and shot him, with Ustimenko burying the body in the woods outside Sillamäe. Not long after Oleinikov's disappearance, the pair were contacted by 20-year-old Vassili Zudin, a friend of the former and a drug addict who knew that both men were wanted criminals and had illegally moved to Estonia – with this, he started blackmailing and extorting them for money, threatening to call the police if they didn't comply with his demands. Realizing that he posed a dangerous threat, on 7 April, Ustimenko and Medvedev lured Zudin to the outskirts of the city, where Ustimenko shot and killed him.

On 11 April, at 14:50 PM, the murderers struck again by attacking 22-year-old Reelika Radsalu, a saleswoman at a grocery store. After shooting her in the head, Ustimenko stole 700 kroons from the cash register and her mobile phone. Radsalu managed to crawl into a nearby store and alert the employees, who immediately called emergency services. Thanks to the early intervention, she survived her injuries. The police felt that the murders were merciless, as the first shot was usually shot in the wall or ceiling, while in these the sellers were immediately shot at. The police found a muffler with a stick made of sandwich paper, which had Made by Predator written on it. Forensic investigators found that a similar letter had been found at the Roosikrantsi explosion site and reported it to the Central Criminal Police, realising they were dealing with serial killers.

On 24 April, 24-year-old money broker Anatoli Bakhmatov was shot and killed while delivering proceeds to a fruit warehouse, with Ustimenko almost immediately afterwards shooting 36-year-old accountant Jelena Zujeva in the head. He and Medvedev then stole 50,000 kroons from the cash register. Despite her injuries, Zujeva survived and recovered from the sustained wounds. On 3 May, the criminals broke into the Küti Hunting Store in Tallinn, where they shot and killed 25-year-old store owner known only by his first name, "Indrek". A box of cartridges was then stolen from the establishment.

=== Suspected crimes ===
In addition to these murders, Ustimenko remains a suspect in two more. Investigators claimed that of his former classmates from the Naval Institute – Ruslan Nukreev and Dmitry Zelinsky – also moved to Estonia illegally in April 2002, possibly aided by Ustimenko and Medvedev, but both then mysteriously vanished. Nukreev's body was found on the banks of the Narva River in late 2002 and was positively identified by his father, while Zelinsky was never found. It was suspected that Ustimenko and Medvedev planned to create a robbery gang with the two men, but for some reason had a disagreement resulting in both Nukreev and Zelinsky being shot to death. However, Ustimenko denied involvement, and was never charged with either of the two cases.

== Medvedev's death and Ustimenko's capture ==
Despite committing very heinous and high-profile crimes, Ustimenko and Medvedev did not exert any caution in their everyday lives and lived lavishly – visiting expensive stores and buying pricey clothing, traveling exclusively by taxi, and eating in high-class bars and restaurants. They also befriended various youths, on whom they generally made a favorable impression. However, local authorities soon noticed that the pair often carried large sums of money despite being supposedly unemployed, prompting them to investigate further. Based on witness statements, Estonian law enforcement agencies created identikits of the suspects in the "Predator" crimes, both of which matched Ustimenko and Medvedev. In order to prevent their possible escape, they also notified authorities from neighboring countries about the suspects.

Meanwhile, in an attempt to evade capture, the pair left Estonia on the early morning of 5 May 2002, crossing the border into Latvia via the border town of Valka. The pair were stopped by several border security guards, and while checking their documents, Ustimenko and Medvedev resisted and attempted to escape. In the ensuing struggle, Medvedev pulled put a gun and fatally shot Corporal Aigars Krupnieks, also wounding his companions, officers Ēriks Zanders and Sandris Jacino. Despite their injuries, both Zanders and Jacino returned fire, killing Medvedev with a shot to the head. In the meantime, Ustimenko successfully fled, leading to him being declared a most wanted fugitive across Latvia, Estonia and several other neighboring states, all of which organized a large-scale search involving helicopters and K-9 handlers, and the inspections of more than a thousand vehicles. In early May, Ustimenko was reportedly spotted crossing the border from Lithuania into Sejny, Poland, where suspicious residents saw him boarding a bus.

== Arrest and location of Ustimenko's diary ==
Ustimenko was arrested in the Polish city of Suwałki on 10 May 2002. Initially, he claimed that his name was Ilia Habarov, and that he was heading to France to join the French Foreign Legion. While inspecting his belongings, authorities found a 9mm Walther P99, leading to him being charged with illegal border crossing and carrying a weapon without a license. Not long after, Ustimenko was convicted of these charges and received a 7-month prison sentence.

In addition to this, authorities also found his personal diary, which contained detailed maps of Estonia and its capital, Tallinn, which were pasted across two pages of the diary. The city map had a large circle around Roozikrantsi Street, from where Ustimenko and Medvedev had stolen their weapons. On other pages, there were carefully pasted photographs of Ustimenko's favorite musical groups, among which were Nautilus Pompilius and Bi-2, whose songs featured in his favorite film, Brother 2.

In addition, the diary contained photographs of about 60 famous people from various historical periods, including Adolf Hitler, Yuri Gagarin and Vladimir Vysotsky. Another set of photographs depicted the September 11 attacks, for which Ustimenko claimed to be in possession of because he had a hatred against America and Jews.

Aside from the photographs, the diary contained quotes from various famous people, including Georgy Zhukov, Honoré de Balzac and Ernest Hemingway. Authorities also indicated there were attempts to link the diary's entries to the Telepin gang's crimes back in Russia, but no evidence of this was found.

== Extradition, trial and imprisonment ==
Immediately after his arrest, the Estonian government began negotiations with the Polish to extradite Ustimenko to their country, where he was charged with several counts of murder and robbery. Similar requests were issued by Latvia and Russia for the respective crimes committed in their jurisdictions. Ultimately, the Polish government extradited Ustimenko to Estonia on 13 November 2002.

During the preliminary investigation, Ustimenko fully cooperated and actively demonstrated how he carried out the crimes, even pointing out where he had buried Valentin Oleinikov's body. In the end, he was charged with five murders, two of which he alleged were carried out solely by Medvedev. In October 2003, the Central Criminal Police of Estonia completed the investigation and sent the report to the court in early November, with the files amounting to 2,500 pages total.

The trial began in early 2004, at which point Ustimenko unexpectedly withdrew his confession, claimed that he was innocent and pinned the blame on his accomplice. Nevertheless, the Tallinn City Court found him guilty on all counts. His sentencing phase lasted for two days due to the 88-page length, the longest sentencing of its kind in the country's history. On 17 March 2004, Judge Anna Ennok sentenced Ustimenko to life imprisonment with the possibility to apply for parole in 2032. In addition, he was ordered to pay 1.5 million kroons in material damages. At the time, he became the 32nd, and at the time the youngest, person sentenced to life imprisonment in the history of independent Estonia.

== Aftermath ==
After his conviction, Ustimenko was transferred to serve his sentence at the Tartu Prison, which at the time was one of best prisons in Eastern Europe in terms of conditions. While in prison, Ustimenko started filing numerous lawsuits against the prison administration and various officials.

Ustimenko filed for clemency to Estonian president Toomas Hendrik Ilves in 2010, but this was denied, along with the similar petitions by other inmates.

In early 2016, Ustimenko filed a petition to be extradited to Russia and continue serving his sentence there, but this was rejected by the Minister of Justice Urmas Reinsalu on 18 May 2016. In early February 2017, filed an appeal to before the Tartu Administrative Court to have the decision be overturned, but this was denied. Reinsalu later commented on his denial, claiming that there was a higher risk of Ustimenko being released if he was transferred to Russian custody.

Again in 2016, Ustimenko filed another lawsuit against the Tartu Prison administration, demanding 1,000 euros in damages. In his claim, he said that he was stuck with a cellmate he had to argue with for over two weeks. On 30 September 2016, the Tartu Administrative Court denied the claim, as it concluded that his placement in the cell with the other prisoner was not illegal. In addition, the court emphasized that during their time together, neither Ustimenko nor his cellmate had ever notified prison staff that there was a supposed conflict between them.

=== Prison crimes ===
On 14 February 2017, Ustimenko attempted to murder a 50-year-old prison guard. During the evening roll call, Ustimenko used a homemade knife to stab the guard in the neck from the bottom up, aiming to damage his carotid artery. The guard was able to resist in time and only escaped with a few cuts and abrasions. On 6 May 2019, the Tartu Court found Ustimenko guilty of attempted murder and gave him an additional 9 years imprisonment, affecting his possibility of parole. Together with Ustimenko, the Court also prosecuted another prisoner, 56-year-old Nikolai Lilichkin, who was found guilty of inciting Ustimenko to carry out the crime – for this he received 8 years, 2 months and 19 days in prison. According to investigators, Lilichkin and Ustimenko communicated with each other via the sewer between 27 August 2015 and 14 February 2017.

In addition to these crimes, Ustimenko was additionally charged with threatening to kill two other guards between 19 November and 4 December 2017; causing first and second-degree burns to an inmate on 21 June 2015 after throwing a mug with boiling water in his face; beating another inmate on 23 January 2017, and seriously disturbing the public order when he used the prison phone to 25 October 2016, only to threaten bombing the Estonian Ministry of Justice building. Although the police quickly established the location of the phone and the caller, the building was nonetheless evacuated and searched, but no explosive device was ever found.

In November 2018, it was revealed that Ustimenko married a visually-impaired Russian woman in 2016. At the end of the year, he was subjected to disciplinary sanctions for numerous violations and was placed in punishment cell. After serving several months, he filed another lawsuit against the Tartu Prison administration, claiming that his detainment in the punishment cell was illegal and that his mental health deteriorated as a result. In December 2019, the court ruled that the prison had violated Ustimenko's human rights, but did not grant him any compensation.

After this, Ustimenko continued to sue the Estonian Ministry of Justice, demanding that he be transferred to Russia to continue serving his sentence there. Yet again, this lawsuit was dismissed on 30 November 2021.

== Public reaction ==
The exposure of Andrei Telepin's gang and the crimes committed by Yuri Ustimenko caused a public outcry in Russia. The leadership of the Naval Institute and the officer corps tried to explain the reasons why cadets of one of the most respected educational institutions turned out to be violent murderers. An officer later gave a statement about the situation to the media.

== See also ==
- List of serial killers by country

== In the media ==
- Ustimenko's crimes were partially covered on an episode of the Russian documentary series Investigation with Eduard Petrov (Russian: Расследование Эдуарда Петрова), titled "Death Course" (Russian: Курс смерти).
