= Karl Becker (philologist) =

German philologist (1775–1849)

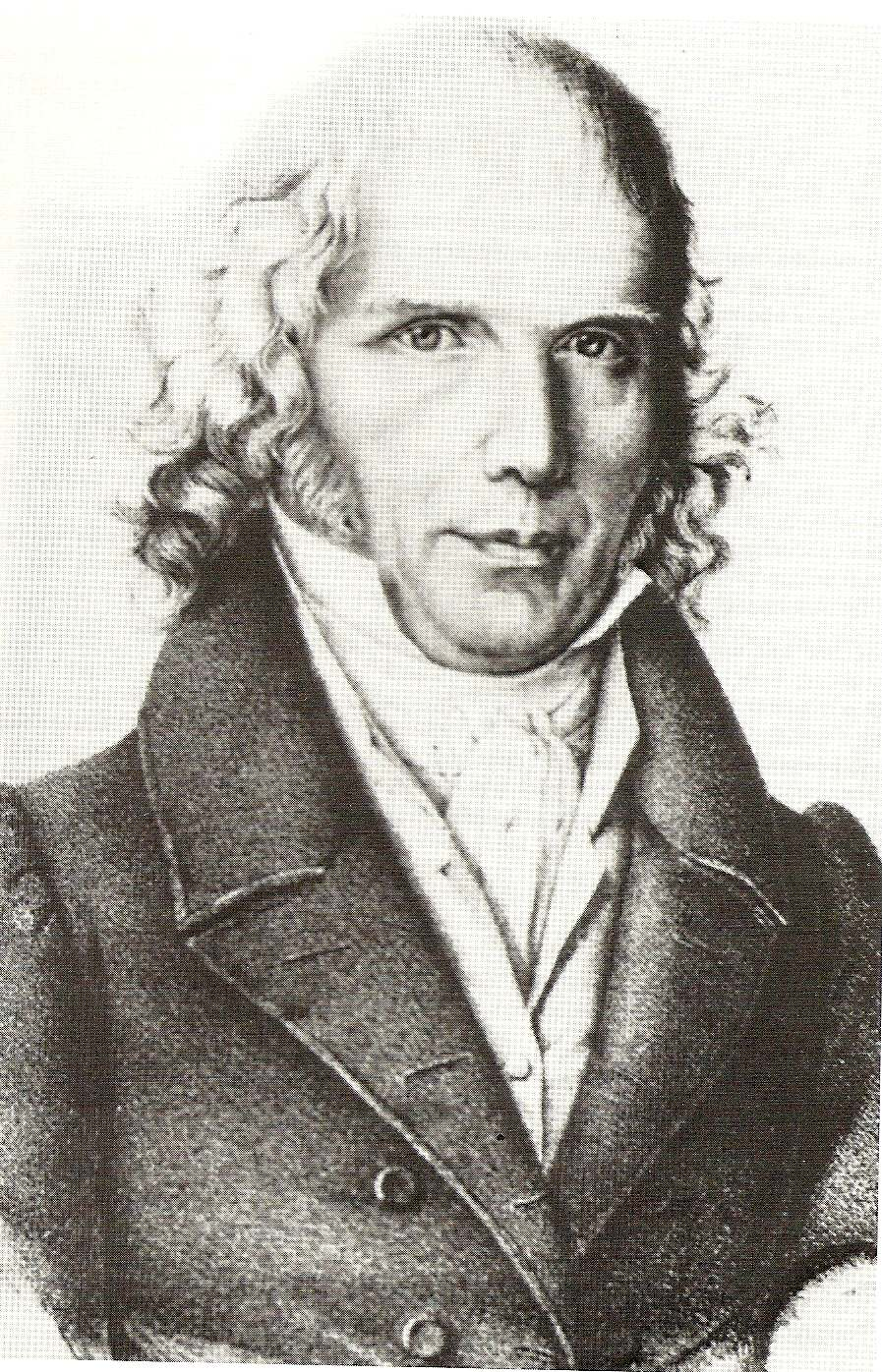
Karl Ferdinand Becker

Karl Ferdinand Becker (14 April 1775 Lieser (Mosel) – 4 September 1849 Offenbach am Main) was a German medical doctor, educationalist, and philologist. He wrote a German grammar. His deductive approach to comparative philology was later discredited.

== Biography ==
He was educated at Hildesheim, and then taught there from 1794 to 1799. He then studied medicine at the University of Göttingen, became a physician at Offenbach in 1815, and was a surgeon in the army. In 1823, he opened a small private school in Offenbach.

== Philological research ==
His work as an instructor led him to make researches in philology, which for a time met with considerable recognition. His view was that all languages are subject to certain logical and philosophical principles, and that thus a science of comparative philology might be arrived at by a process of deduction. This method was later largely discredited by the investigations of Jakob Grimm and others, whereby comparative philology is based on principles of history and ethnology and is attained inductively.

Becker is also known for promoting the theory that there are only three grammatical relations present in language (the predicative, attributive and objective relations), a theory which is still used by contemporary linguists.

== Works ==
- Deutsche Wortbildung (German word formation, Frankfurt 1824)
- Ausführliche deutsche Grammatik (A complete German grammar, 3 parts, 1836–39)
- Organismen der Sprache (2d ed., Prague 1841)
- Der deutsche Stil (German style, Prague 1848; 3d ed. revised by Lyon, 1884)

His grammars and manuals on the German language went through many editions.

== Literature ==
- W. Keith Percival. 2008. 'Josiah Gibbs (1790–1861): An echo of Karl Ferdinand Becker in the New World'. In: Lo van Driel & Theo Janssen (eds), Ontheven aan de tijd. Linguistic-historiografische studies voor Jan Noordegraaf bij zijn zestigste verjaardag. Amsterdam: Stichting Neerlandistiek VU & Muenster: Nodus Publikationen, 161-170. (ISBN 978-3-89323-757-9)
