= Feline Conservation Federation =

American nonprofit organization

The Feline Conservation Foundation (FCF) is a 501(c)(3) non-profit organization based in the Ohio, United States, with a mission to conserve wild felines through educational opportunities, responsible ownership and advocacy. The Feline Conservation Foundation seeks to bridge the gap between professional zoos and private institutions to strengthen the genetic diversity of felines within zoological settings. The organization supports its members by offering resources that are current and progressive, and that promote optimal welfare and safety. The membership includes a wide range of exotic cat enthusiasts such as professional breeders, educators, sanctuary and zoo owners, and individual hobbyists, although ownership of or regular work with a wild feline is not required for membership.

== History ==
The history of the FCF originates with the founding of the Long Island Ocelot Club in 1956 by Catherine Cisin. In 1997, the organization was incorporated as "LIOC - Endangered Species Conservation Federation". By 2002, the organization changed its name to the "Feline Conservation Federation". A group of members split off in the early 2000s, and re-formed the "Long Island Ocelot Club", a completely separate organization mostly focused on the smaller species. That organization ceased operations in the mid 2000s. In 2019, the main group updated their name to "Feline Conservation Foundation". The group continues to use an ocelot-based logo in honor of its historical significance to the group.

== Communication and activities ==
The Feline Conservation Federation publishes a quarterly journal, hosts a website and maintains a presence on social media.

Primarily focused on education, in situ conservation, and captive breeding to protect against extinction, the Feline Conservation Federation has developed a well-respected Wild Felid Husbandry Course and other courses and workshops intended to teach best practices to individuals who own or work with wild cats. The group also welcomes guest speakers and course instructors at its annual conference. Other topics covered in these courses include contingency planning resources, responsible use of these species as educational outreach animals in wildlife education programs, informed advocacy in legislative and regulatory platforms, and use of safety equipment like chemical capture devices.

In response to the issues that surround big cats, the FCF board of directors approved a "Policy on Big Cats" that discourages ownership by novices and those lacking proper facilities, knowledge and resources.

The group's concern for wild cats extends beyond those in captivity and the Feline Conservation Federation awards grants for research and conservation of felines in the wild. In the 20 years from 2000 to 2020, the group has contributed tens of thousands of dollars to in situ conservation efforts, with a focus on supporting the chronically underfunded small wild cat species.

The group conducts a census of wild cat ownership periodically, using resources available through the Freedom of Information Act and information from surveys of its own membership. The group publishes information about this census on its web site and in its journal, and the group shares the methodology and information with outside sources to aid in confirming the data and improving the accuracy of future results. As part of the 2016 census, information was shared for an article about the number of big cats living in captive settings in the US. The article is posted on Rachel Garner's blog, "Why Animals Do The Thing".

== Wild Feline Husbandry Course ==
The Feline Conservation Federation teaches a Wild Feline Husbandry Course. This eight-hour course focuses on responsible captive husbandry of wild felines. It is suitable for both novices and "old hands" who want to improve their level of knowledge. State G & F officials and USDA Animal Care Inspectors have attended this course giving FCF favorable reviews from both agencies. This course was professionally developed in accordance with a nationally recognized standard for technical training known as the Systematic Approach to Training (SAT).

Topics covered include:

- Natural History of Wild Felines
- Regulatory Agencies & Permits
- Facility Design
- Handling Equipment
- Diet / Nutrition
- Health Care Basics
- Disposition & Handling
- Behavior Conditioning
