= Pavel Medvedev (ice hockey, born 1989) =

Russian ice hockey player

- Born: September 8, 1989 (age 36) Penza, Russia
- Height: 5 ft 9 in (175 cm)
- Weight: 154 lb (70 kg; 11 st 0 lb)
- Position: Centre
- Shoots: Right
- Kazakhstan team: HK Almaty
- NHL draft: Undrafted
- Playing career: 2006–present

Pavel Medvedev (born September 8, 1989) is a Russian professional ice hockey player who is currently playing with HK Almaty in the Kazakhstan Vyschaya Liga.
