= Aleksey Khovansky (publisher) =

Russian linguist

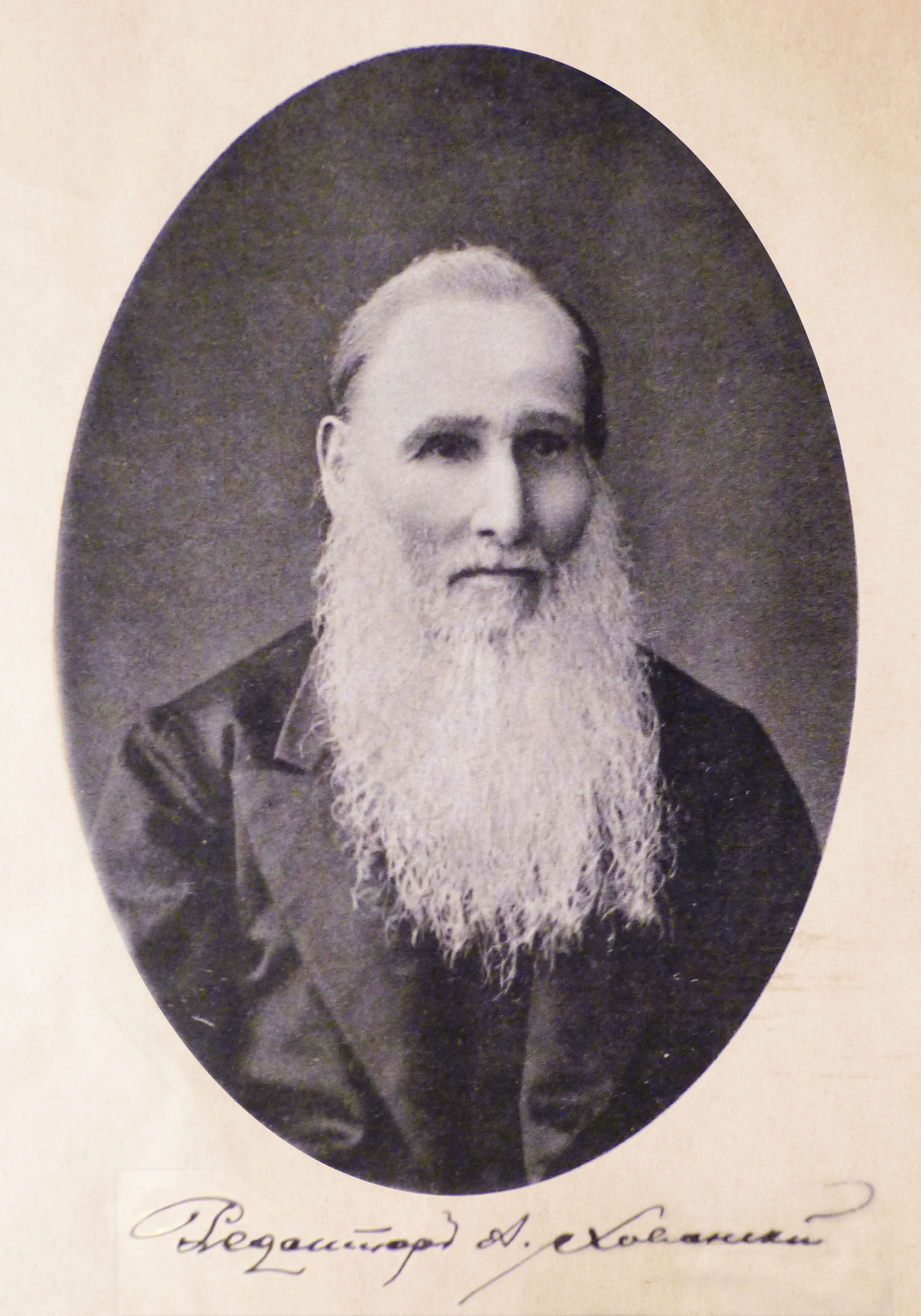
Alexey Andreyevich Khovansky

Alexey Andreyevich Khovansky (Russian: Алексей Андреевич Хованский; 1814 in Penza – 29 January 1899 in Voronezh) was a publisher of the first Russian scientific linguistic journal Filologicheskie Zapiski. He published this magazine on his own expenses and headed it for 40 years. In recognition of his contributions to Russian language he became a Knight of the Order of St. Anna and the Order of St. Vladimir.

Many famous Russian and Slavic scholars published their articles and papers in his journal. He was "only" a Russian teacher, but many scientists considered him their peer. A member of the Imperial Russian Academy of Sciences Fyodor Buslaev said: "Chowanski was not only a publisher of other contributions, but a real editor, that is a specialist who directed, corrected and added the articles of its authors".

The main content of his work was the creation of a "method for smarter, more rational and practical education of the mother tongue".

He called this method "The Living Word": "A lively and fascinating word is a great power that can capture the attention of the audience, the force that moves the hearts and feelings, – one might say – the soul of teaching practice. A charming and humorous story has a great importance for every scientific".

After his death in 1899 there was established the Khovansky-fund and the annual prize for the best teachers.
