= Dmitry Gennadyevich Medvedev =

Russian military officer (1970–2005)

Dmitry Gennadyevich Medvedev Дмитрий Геннадьевич Медведев
- Born: 1970 (Soviet Union) Kemerovo, Russian SFSR, USSR
- Died: 15 April 2005 (aged 34–35); Grozny, Chechnya, Russia
- Military career
- Allegiance: Russia
- Branch: Federal Security Service
- Service years: 2002–2005
- Rank: Lieutenant-Colonel
- Awards: Hero of the Russian Federation

Dmitry Gennadyevich Medvedev (Russian: Дми́трий Генна́дьевич Медве́дев; 1970 – 15 April 2005) was a Lieutenant-Colonel in the Federal Security Service of the Russian Federation who was killed in action in Chechnya. For his service he was posthumously honoured as a Hero of the Russian Federation.

== Biography ==
Medvedev was born in Kemerovo in 1970 to a normal Soviet working family. His father was a miner, and wished for his son to join the military. In 1988 Medvedev began studies at the Higher Frontier Command School in Alma-Ata and after graduation he served in the Far Eastern frontier district. He later served in the North Caucasus regional administration of the Federal Security Service. Medvedev took part in campaigns to restore constitutional order in Tajikistan during that country's civil war.

In April 2002, Medvedev enlisted in the security services, and completed several tours of duty in the North Caucasus region, where he participated in counter-terrorism operations.

He was awarded Order Of Service To The Fatherland 2nd-class, 2 Medals For Courage and a Medal For Distinguished Service In Defence Of The State Frontiers.

== Death ==
During the FSB operation on 8 March 2005 in Tolstoy-Yurt during which Aslan Maskhadov was killed, Kommersant reported that documents were found which indicated that the insurgent field commander Dokka Umarov was using an apartment on Bogdan Khmelnitsky Street in Leninsky District of Grozny as a base of operation.

On 15 April 2005, whilst carrying out a special operation in Grozny, Medvedev and two comrades of the Vympel unit of the FSB were killed. On 18 May 2005, President Vladimir Putin bestowed on Medvedev the title "Hero of the Russian Federation".

== See also ==
- List of Heroes of the Russian Federation
