= Alexei Medvedev (ice hockey) =

Russian ice hockey player

- Born: January 13, 1982 (age 43)
- Height: 5 ft 11 in (180 cm)
- Weight: 192 lb (87 kg; 13 st 10 lb)
- Position: Forward
- KHL team Former teams: Severstal Cherepovets; Salavat Yulaev Ufa
- NHL draft: Undrafted
- Playing career: 2003–present

Alexei Anatolyevich Medvedev (born January 13, 1982) is a Russian professional ice hockey forward who currently plays for Severstal Cherepovets of the Kontinental Hockey League (KHL).
