= Grand Duchess Maria Nikolaevna of Russia =

Third daughter of Tsar Nicholas II of Russia (1899–1918)

Grand Duchess Maria Nikolaevna
- Maria in 1914
- Born: 26 June 1899; Peterhof Palace, Saint Petersburg, Russia
- Died: 17 July 1918 (aged 19); Ipatiev House, Yekaterinburg, Russia
- Cause of death: Gunshot wounds (murder)
Names
- Maria Nikolaevna Romanova
- House: Holstein-Gottorp-Romanov
- Father: Nicholas II of Russia
- Mother: Alix of Hesse and by Rhine
- Religion: Russian Orthodox
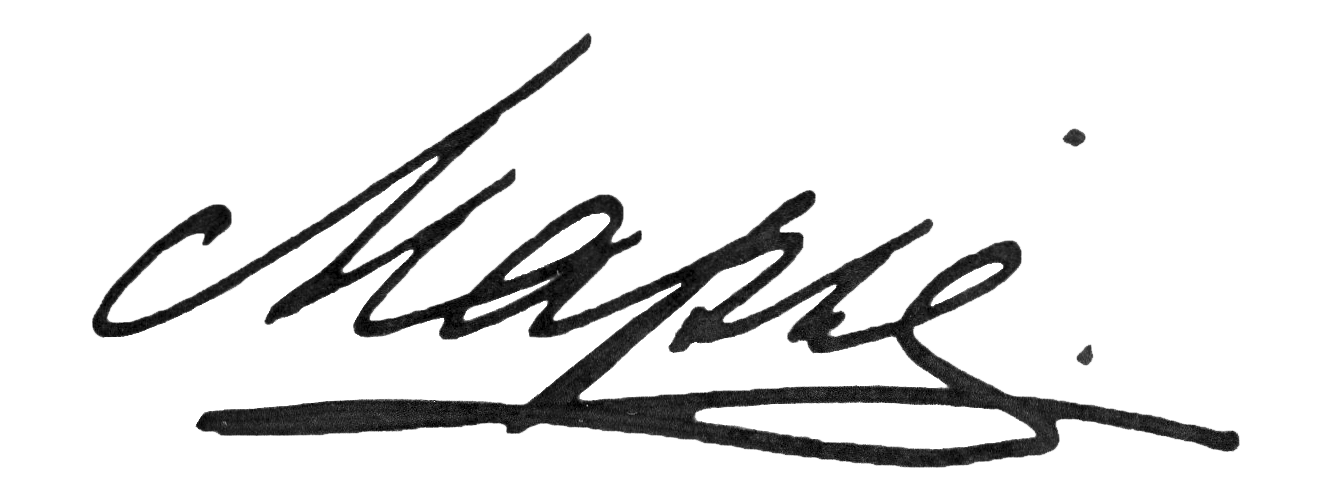
- Signature

Grand Duchess Maria Nikolaevna of Russia (Russian: Мария Николаевна, romanized: Mariya Nikolayevna; 26 June [O.S. 14 June] 1899 – 17 July 1918) (Note: In 1900 and later, her birthday was celebrated on 27 June new style.) was the middle child and third daughter of Tsar Nicholas II and Tsarina Alexandra Feodorovna. Her murder following the Russian Revolution of 1917 resulted in her canonization as a passion bearer by the Russian Orthodox Church.

During her lifetime, Maria, too young to become a Red Cross nurse like her elder sisters during World War I, was patroness of a hospital and instead visited wounded soldiers. Throughout her lifetime she was noted for her interest in the lives of the soldiers. The flirtatious Maria had a number of innocent crushes on the young men she met, beginning in early childhood. She hoped to marry and have a large family.

She was an elder sister of Grand Duchess Anastasia Nikolaevna of Russia, whose alleged escape from the assassination of the imperial family was rumored for nearly 90 years. However, it was later proven that Anastasia did not escape and that those who claimed to be her were imposters. In the 1990s, it was suggested that Maria might have been the grand duchess whose remains were missing from the Romanov grave that was discovered near Yekaterinburg, Russia and exhumed in 1991. Further remains were discovered in 2007, and DNA analysis subsequently proved that the entire Imperial family had been murdered in 1918. A funeral for the remains of Maria and Alexei to be buried with their family in October 2015 was postponed indefinitely by the Russian Orthodox Church, which took custody of the remains in December and declared without explanation that the case required further study; the 44 partial bone fragments remain stored in a Russian state repository.

== Early life ==
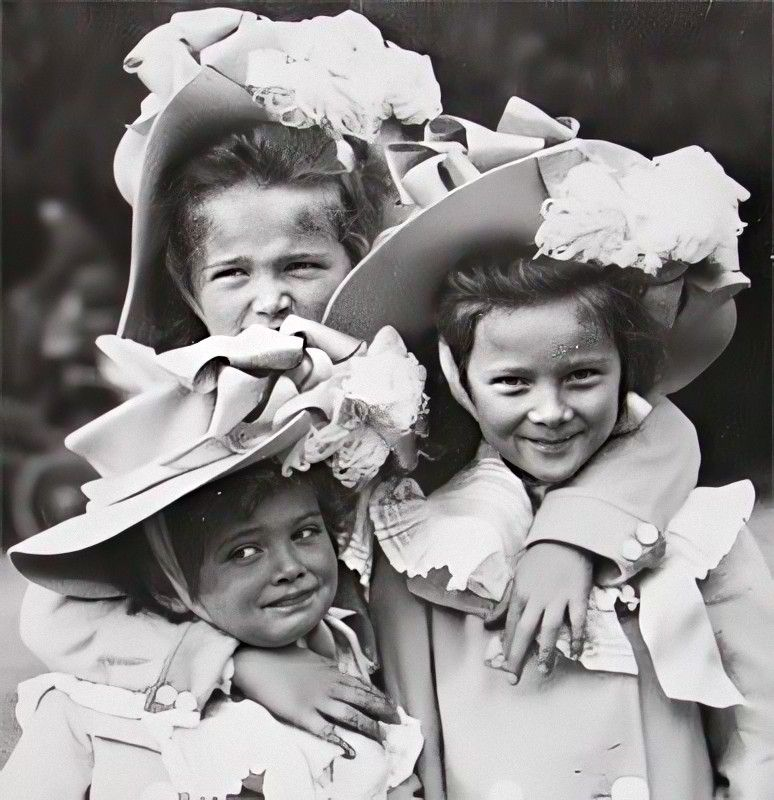
The Grand Duchesses Maria, Olga and Tatiana Nikolaevna of Russia, 1903

Maria was born on 26 June 1899. She was the middle child and third daughter of Emperor Nicholas II and Empress Alexandra. She weighed 4.5 kg at birth. The birth of a third daughter led to widespread disappointment in Russia. Grand Duke Konstantin Konstantinovich, Nicholas' cousin, wrote, "And so there's no Heir. The whole of Russia will be disappointed by this news." Queen Victoria of the United Kingdom, Alexandra's grandmother and Maria's great-grandmother, wrote, "I regret the third girl for the country. I know that an heir would be more welcome than a daughter." Nicholas insisted that he was happy with Maria's birth, and he told Alexandra "I dare complain the least, having such happiness on earth, having a treasure like you my beloved Alix, and already the three little cherubs."

As a toddler, little Maria once escaped from her bath and ran naked up and down the palace corridor while her distracted Irish nurse, Margaretta Eagar, who loved politics, discussed the Dreyfus Affair with a friend. "Fortunately, I arrived just at that moment, picked her up and carried her back to Miss Eagar, who was still talking about Dreyfus," recalled her aunt Grand Duchess Olga Alexandrovna of Russia.

Maria's siblings were Grand Duchess Olga of Russia, Grand Duchess Tatiana of Russia, Grand Duchess Anastasia of Russia, and Tsarevich Alexei of Russia. Maria's Russian title (Velikaya Knyazhna Великая Княжна) is most precisely translated as "Grand Princess", meaning that Maria, as an "Imperial Highness" was higher in rank than other Princesses in Europe who were "Royal Highnesses". "Grand Duchess" is the most widely used English translation of the title. However, in keeping with her parents' desire to raise Maria and her siblings simply, even servants addressed the Grand Duchess by her first name and patronym, Maria Nikolaevna. She was also called by the French version of her name, "Marie", or by the Russian nicknames "Masha" or "Mashka".

Maria and her younger sister, Anastasia, were known within the family as "The Little Pair". The two girls shared a room, often wore variations of the same dress, and spent much of their time together. Their older sisters, Olga and Tatiana, also shared a room and were known as "The Big Pair". The four girls sometimes signed letters using the nickname OTMA, which was derived from the first letters of their first names.

Maria and Anastasia were dressed similarly for special occasions, when they wore variations of the same dress. She tended to be dominated by her enthusiastic and energetic younger sister. When Anastasia tripped people who walked by, teased others or caused a scene with her dramatics, Maria always tried to apologize, though she could never stop her younger sister. Her mother's friend Lili Dehn said that while Maria was not as lively as her three sisters, she knew her own mind.

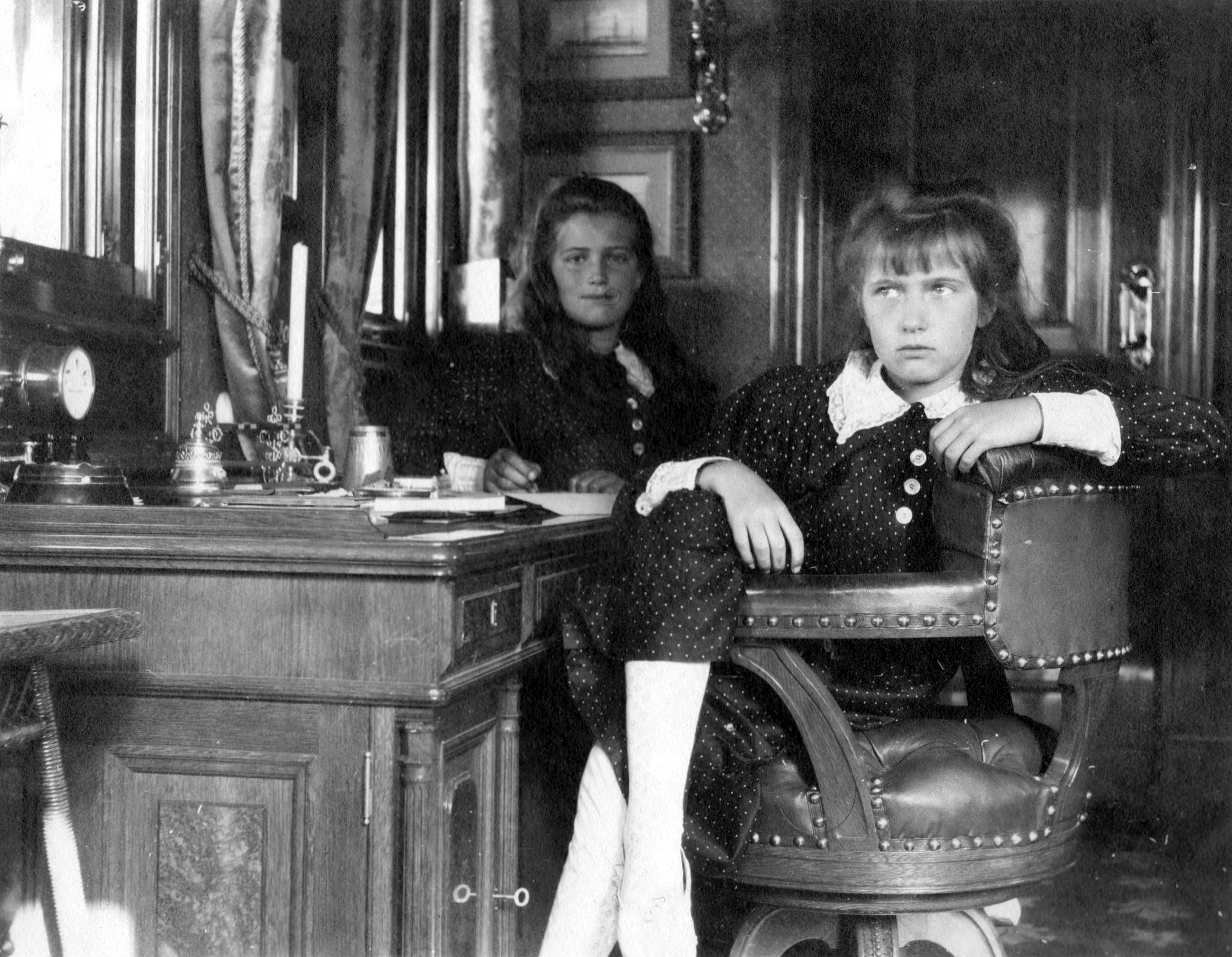
Maria and Anastasia in Nicholas II's stateroom aboard the Standart, 1911

Young Maria enjoyed innocent flirtations with the young soldiers she encountered at the palace and on family holidays. She particularly loved children and, had she not been a Grand Duchess, would have loved nothing more than to marry a Russian soldier and raise a large family. Maria was fond of soldiers from a very early age, according to Margaretta Eagar:

One day the little Grand Duchess Marie was looking out of the window at a regiment of soldiers marching past and exclaimed, "Oh! I love these dear soldiers; I should like to kiss them all!" I said, "Marie, nice little girls don't kiss soldiers." A few days afterwards we had a children's party, and the Grand Duke Constantine's children were amongst the guests. One of them, having reached twelve years of age, had been put into the Corps de Cadets, and came in his uniform. He wanted to kiss his little cousin Marie, but she put her hand over her mouth and drew back from the proffered embrace. "Go away, soldier," said she, with great dignity. "I don't kiss soldiers." The boy was greatly delighted at being taken for a real soldier, and not a little amused at the same time.

Until his own assassination in 1979, her first cousin Louis Mountbatten, 1st Earl Mountbatten of Burma, kept a photograph of Maria beside his bed in memory of the crush he had upon her. In 1910, Louis met the Romanov sisters. He later reflected that "they were lovely, and terribly sweet, far more beautiful than their photographs," and he said that "I was crackers about Marie, and was determined to marry her. She was absolutely lovely."

At age eleven, Maria apparently developed a painful crush on one of the young men she had met. "Try not to let your thoughts dwell too much on him, that's what our Friend said," Alexandra wrote to her on 6 December 1910. Alexandra advised her third daughter to keep her feelings hidden because others might say unkind things to her about her crush. "One must not let others see what one feels inside, when one knows it's considered not proper. I know he likes you as a little sister and would like to help you not to care too much, because he knows you, a little Grand Duchess, must not care for him so."

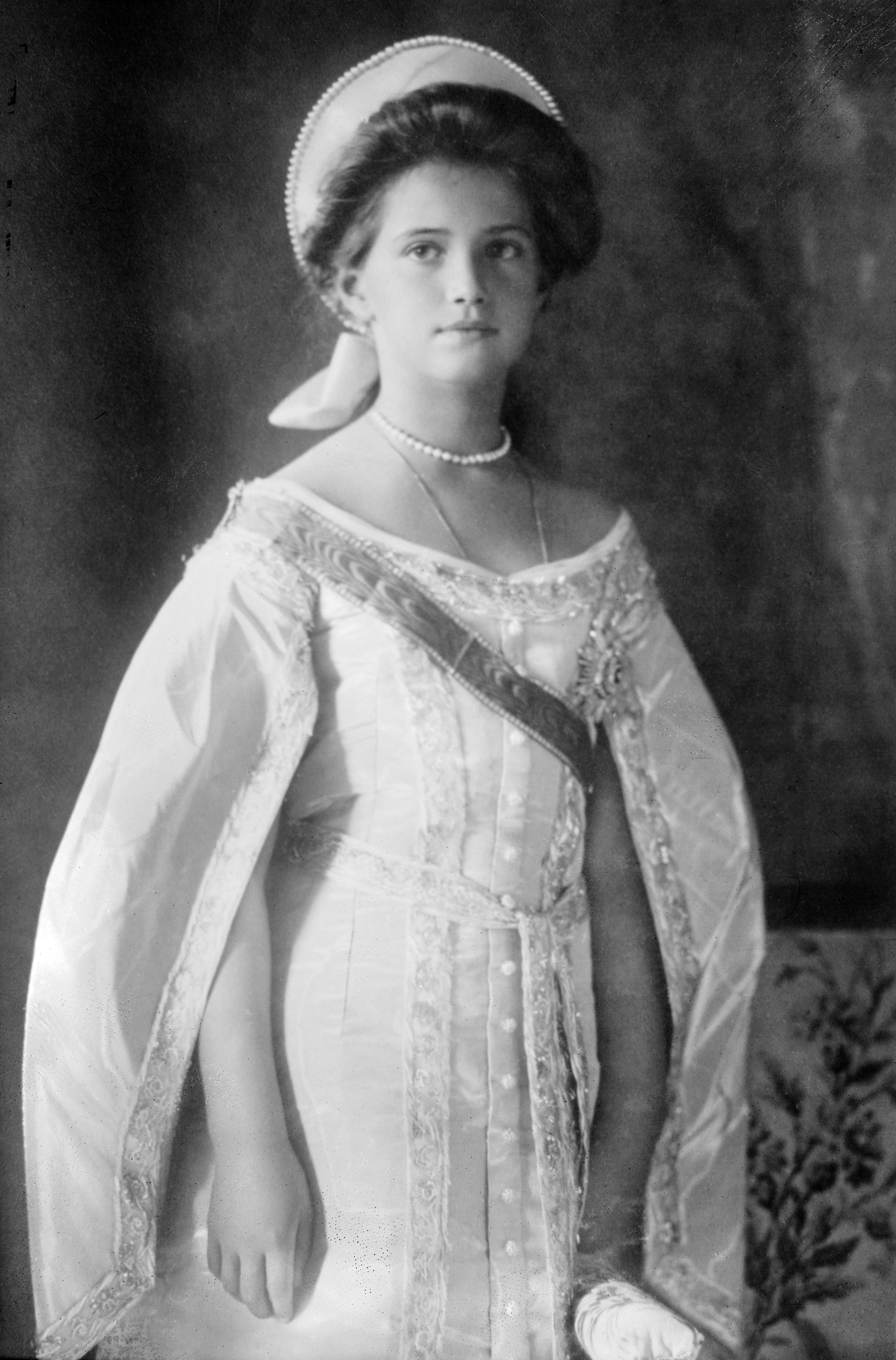
Formal Portrait of Grand Duchess Maria Taken in 1910 in her court dress

In 1917, Prince Carol of Romania visited Russia. Before he left for Moscow on 26 January, he made a formal proposal for Maria's hand. Nicholas "good-naturedly laughed the Prince's proposal aside" because Maria "was nothing more than a schoolgirl." Queen Marie of Romania was hopeful about "a marriage for Carol with one of Nicky's daughters," and she found the fact that Nicholas considered the match "flattering and... a good sign!"

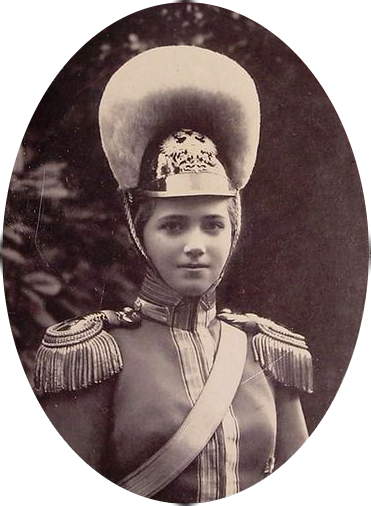
Grand Duchess Maria as colonel-in-chief of the Russian Horse Grenadiers Regiment.

Like her younger sister Anastasia, Maria visited wounded soldiers at a private hospital on the grounds of the palace at Tsarskoye Selo during World War I. The two teenagers, who were too young to become nurses like their mother and elder sisters, played games of checkers and billiards with the soldiers and attempted to uplift their spirits. A wounded soldier named Dmitri signed Maria's commonplace book and addressed her by one of her nicknames: "the famous Mandrifolie".

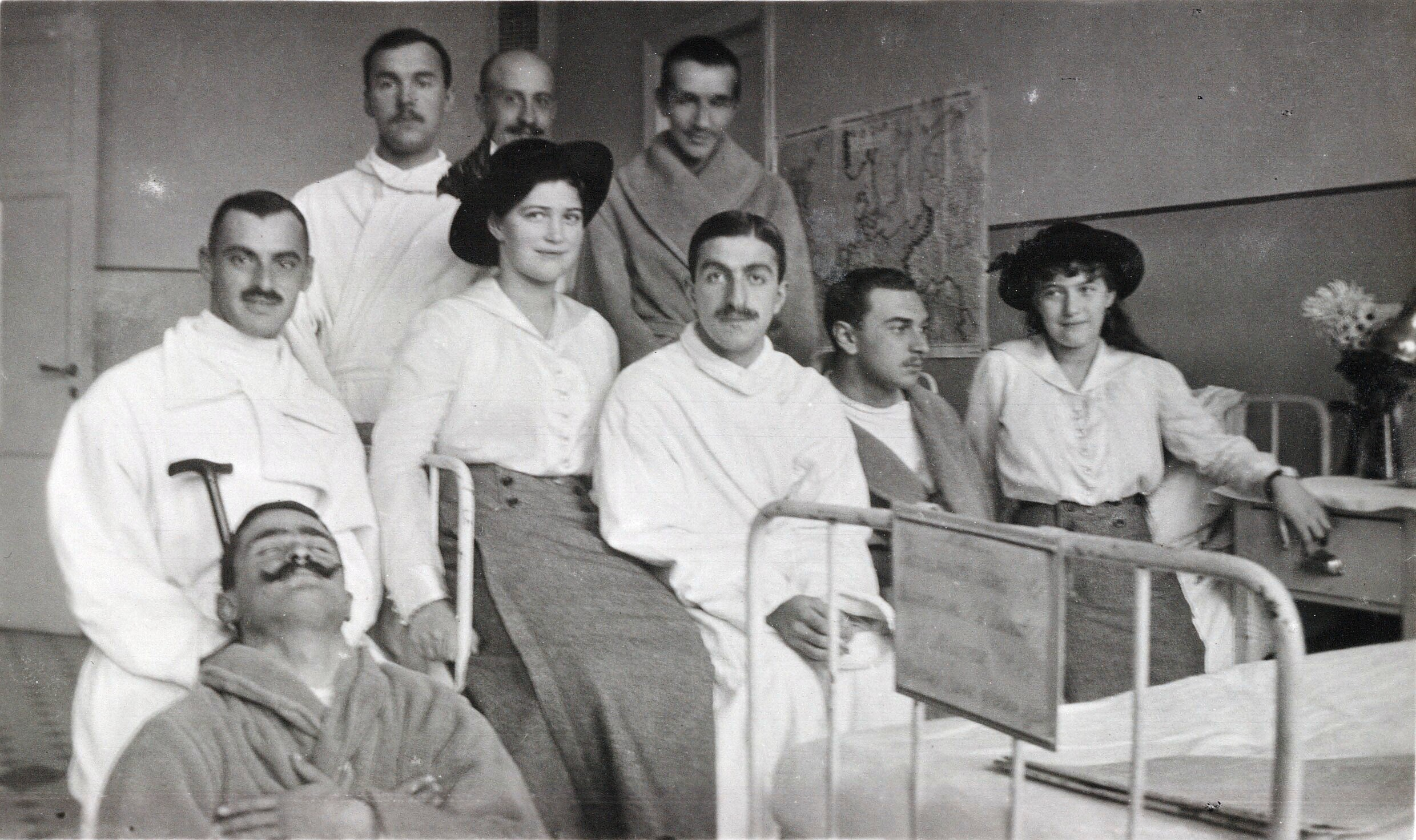
Grand Duchess Maria and Anastasia pose with wounded soldiers while visiting the hospital located into the Feodorovsky Gorodok village, 1915. All the four OTMA sisters served there daily during the war.

During the war, Maria and Anastasia also paid a visit to a nurses' school and helped to tend to the children. She wrote her father that she thought of him when she was feeding the children and cleaned the gruel running down their chins with a spoon. For a break during the war, Maria, her sisters and mother sometimes visited the Tsar and Tsarevich Alexei at the war headquarters in Mogilev. During these visits, Maria developed an attraction to Nikolai Dmitrievich Demenkov, an officer of the day at the Tsar's Headquarters. When the women returned to Tsarskoye Selo, Maria often asked her father to give her regards to Demenkov and sometimes jokingly signed her letters to the Tsar "Mrs. Demenkov".

== Appearance and personality ==
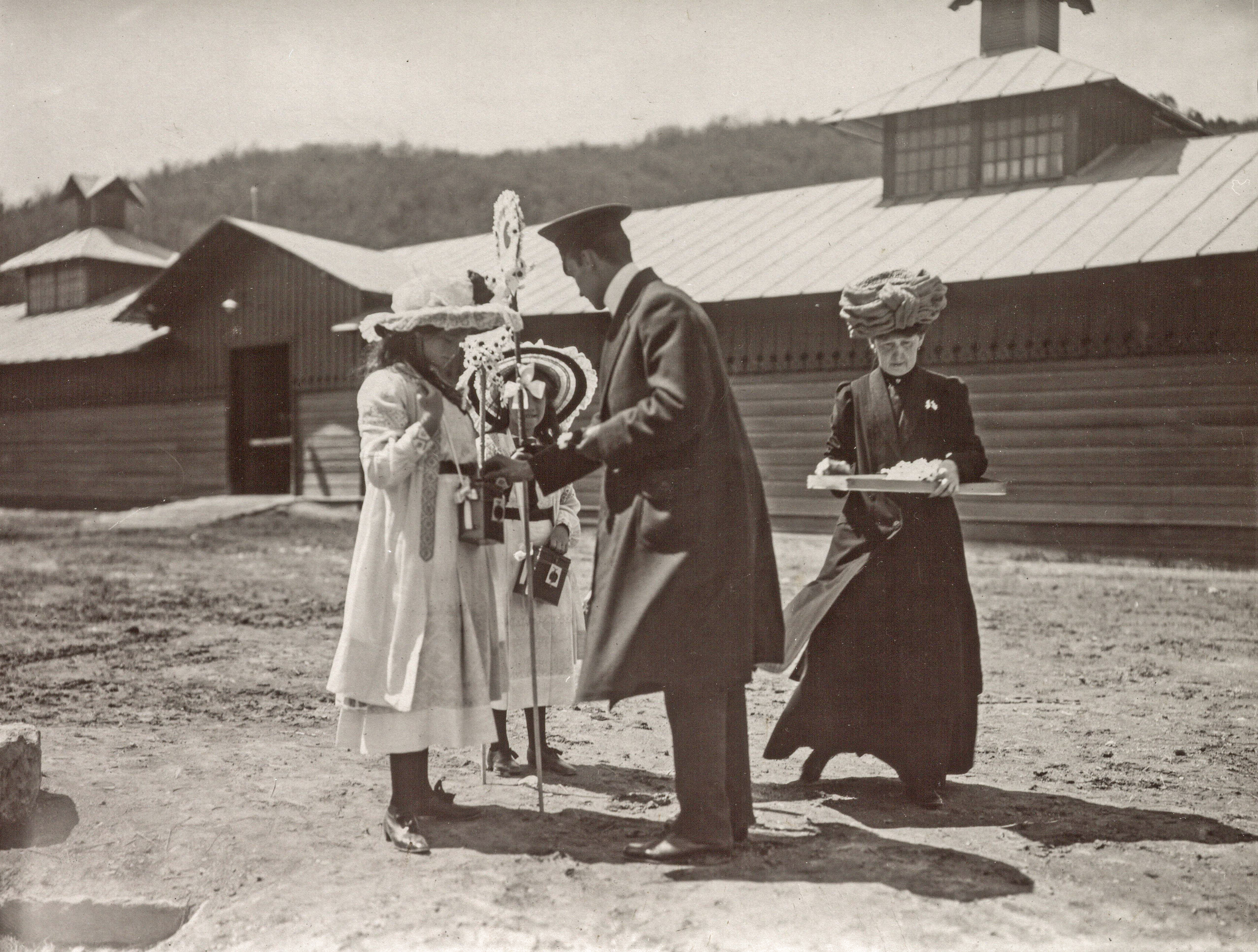
Maria and her sister Anastasia Nikolaevna on the 1912 White Flower Day, selling white flowers to people in Livadiya and Yalta, in Crimea.

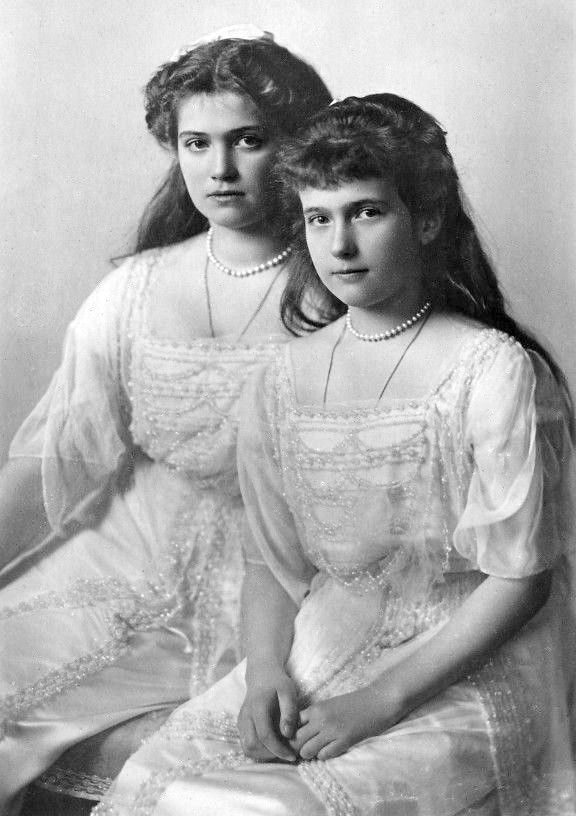
Formal portrait of Grand Duchesses Maria and Anastasia Nikolaevna of Russia, 1914

Maria was a noted beauty. She had light brown hair and large blue eyes that were known in the family as "Marie's saucers." Maria, Duchess of Saxe-Coburg and Gotha, Maria's great-aunt, declared that Maria was "a real beauty... with enormous blue eyes." Her mother's friend Lili Dehn wrote that she "was exceeding fair, dowered with the classic beauty of the Romanoffs." A gentleman at the Imperial court said that the infant Maria "had the face of one of Botticelli's angels." Her French tutor Pierre Gilliard said Maria was tall and well-built, with rosy cheeks. Tatiana Botkina thought the expression in Maria's eyes was "soft and gentle". Baroness Sophie Buxhoeveden, her mother's lady-in-waiting, reflected that "[Maria] was like Olga in colouring and features, but all on a more vivid scale. She had the same charming smile, the same shape of face." She would also go on to say that her eyes were "magnificent, of a deep blue," and that "her hair had golden lights in it."

Like her grandfather Alexander III of Russia, Maria was unusually strong. She sometimes amused herself by demonstrating how she could lift her tutors off the ground. Maria had a talent for drawing and sketched well, always using her left hand. Sophie Buxhoevedon described Maria as the only artistically talented one of her sisters. However, Maria was uninterested in her schoolwork.

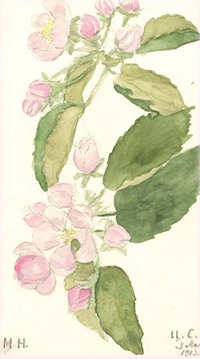
A watercolor by Maria, 1913.

Maria could be stubborn and lazy. Her mother complained in one letter that Maria was grumpy and "bellowed" at the people who irritated her. Maria's moodiness coincided with her menstrual period, which the Tsarina and her daughters referred to as a visit from "Madame Becker". Maria had a kind, sweet personality. Grand Duke Vladimir Alexandrovich of Russia nicknamed her "The Amiable Baby" because of her good nature.

Margaretta Eagar said that "Maria was born good... with the very smallest trace of original sin as possible." According to Eagar, her older sisters Olga and Tatiana once referred to Maria as their "stepsister" because she was so good and never got into trouble. When she stole biscuits from her mother's tea table, Nicholas said that he was relieved "to see she is only a human child" because he "was always afraid of the wings growing."

Maria's sisters took advantage of her. Her sisters nicknamed her "fat little bow-wow". In 1910, Maria wrote Alexandra a letter asking to give Olga her own room and allow her to let down her dresses. Maria tried to persuade her mother that it was her own idea to write the letter, including at the end of the letter "P.S. It was my idea to write to you."

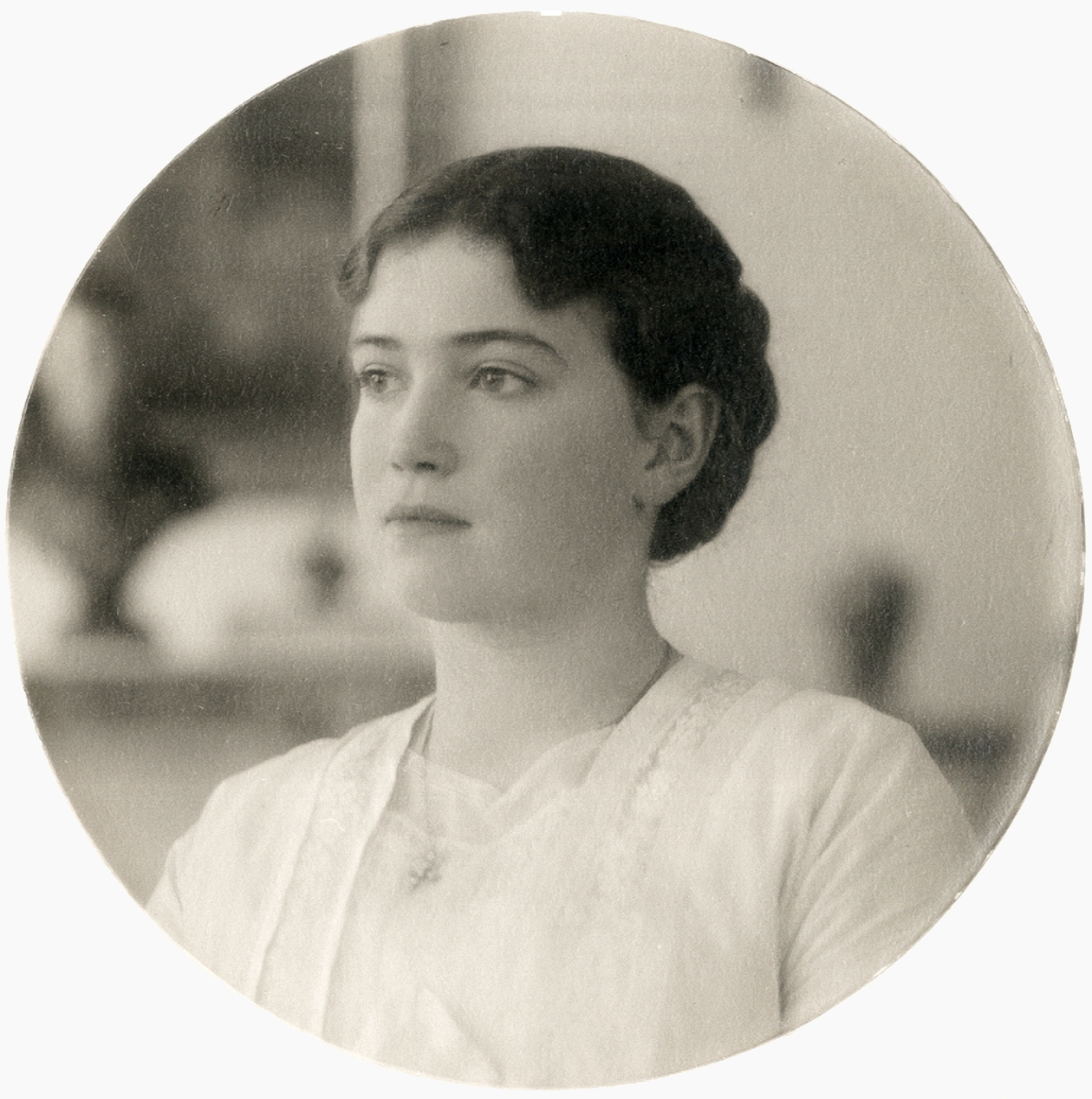
Photo of Maria Nikolaevna of Russia by Eugène Fabergé in 1914

Maria was very close to her father. Eagar noted that Maria's love for her father was "marked" and she often tried to escape from the nursery to "go to Papa". When Nicholas was ill with typhoid, she covered a miniature portrait of him with kisses every night. As she and her family waited for her father to return to Tsarskoye Selo after his abdication, she grew ill with measles. As she became delirious, she kept repeating, "Oh, I did so want to be up when Papa comes" until she lost consciousness.

As the middle child of the family, Maria felt insecure about her role and worried that she was not as loved as her siblings were. She apparently worried that her mother preferred Anastasia to her, as Alexandra sent her a note "I have no secrets with Anastasia, I do not like secrets." Alexandra sent Maria another note: "Sweet child, you must promise me never again to think that nobody loves you. How did such an extraordinary idea get into your little head? Get it quickly out again." Feeling excluded by her older sisters, Maria tried to befriend her cousin Princess Irina Alexandrovna, but Alexandra warned her that this would only make her sisters "imagine... that you do not want to be with them."

== Relationship with Rasputin ==
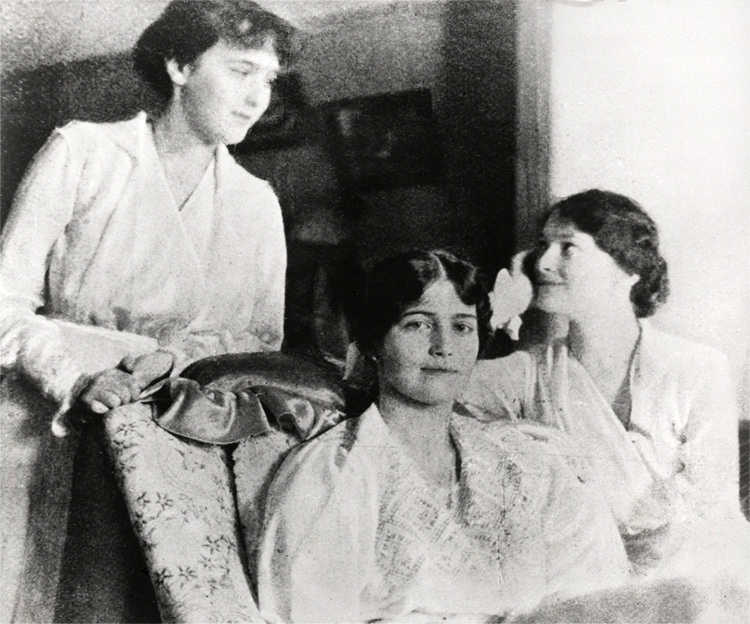
After her illness Grand Duchess Maria (center) with Anastasia and Tatiana taken in 1917

Maria, like all her family, doted on the long-awaited heir Tsarevich Alexei, or "Baby", who suffered frequent complications of hemophilia and nearly died several times. Her mother relied on the counsel of Grigori Rasputin, a Russian peasant and wandering starets or "holy man" and credited his prayers with saving the ailing Tsarevich on numerous occasions. Maria and her siblings were also taught to view Rasputin as "Our Friend" and to share confidences with him. In the autumn of 1907, Maria's aunt Grand Duchess Olga Alexandrovna of Russia was escorted to the nursery by the Tsar to meet Rasputin. Maria, her sisters and brother Alexei were all wearing their long white nightgowns. "All the children seemed to like him," Olga Alexandrovna recalled. "They were completely at ease with him."

Rasputin's friendship with the imperial children was evident in the messages he sent to them. "My Dear Pearl M!" Rasputin wrote the nine-year-old Maria in one telegram in 1908. "Tell me how you talked with the sea, with nature! I miss your simple soul. We will see each other soon! A big kiss." In a second telegram, Rasputin told the child, "My Dear M! My Little Friend! May the Lord help you to carry your cross with wisdom and joy in Christ. This world is like the day, look it's already evening. So it is with the cares of the world." In February 1909, Rasputin sent all of the imperial children a telegram, advising them to "Love the whole of God's nature, the whole of His creation in particular this earth. The Mother of God was always occupied with flowers and needlework."

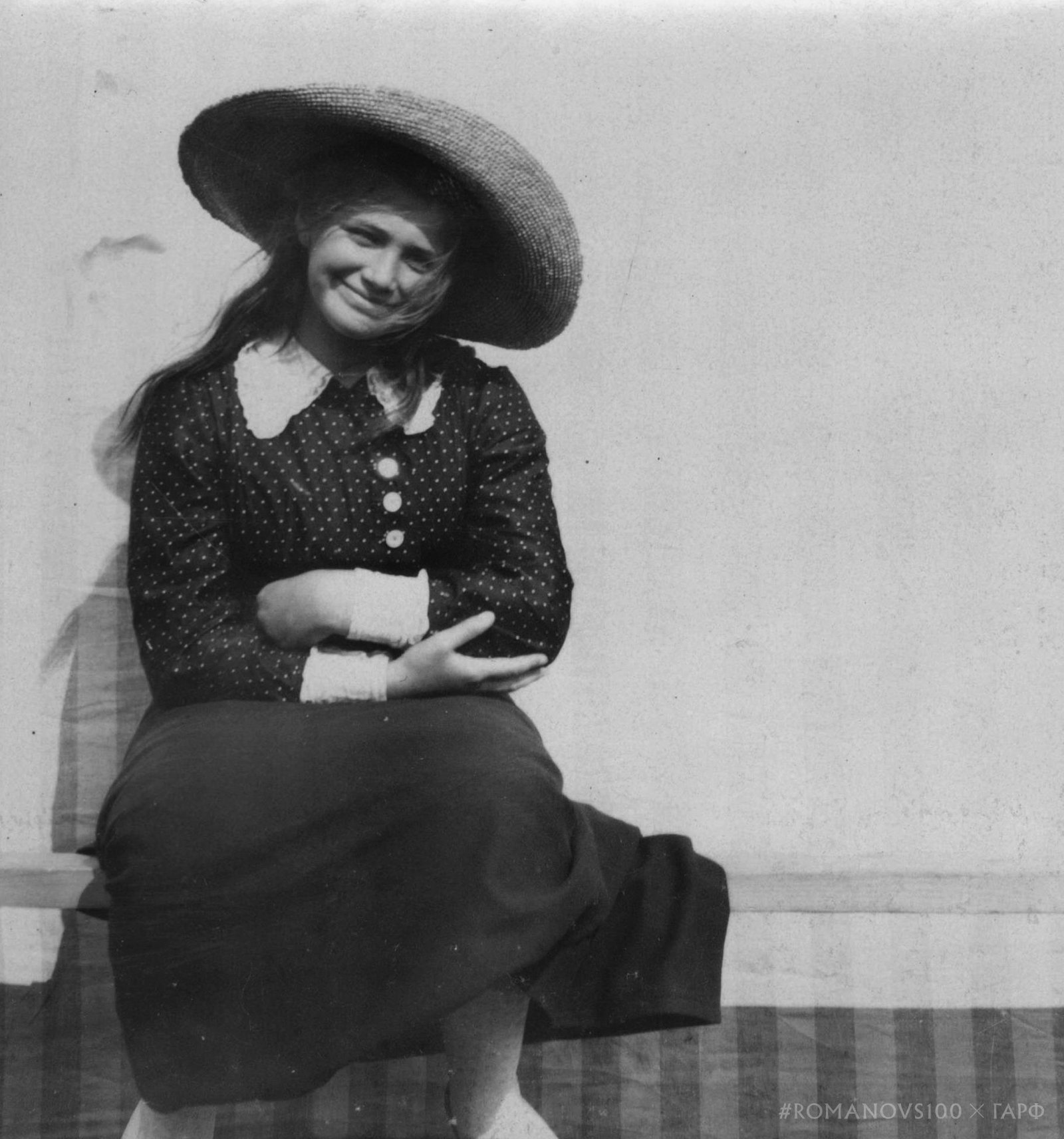
Smiling Grand Duchess Maria, Finland, c. 1912.

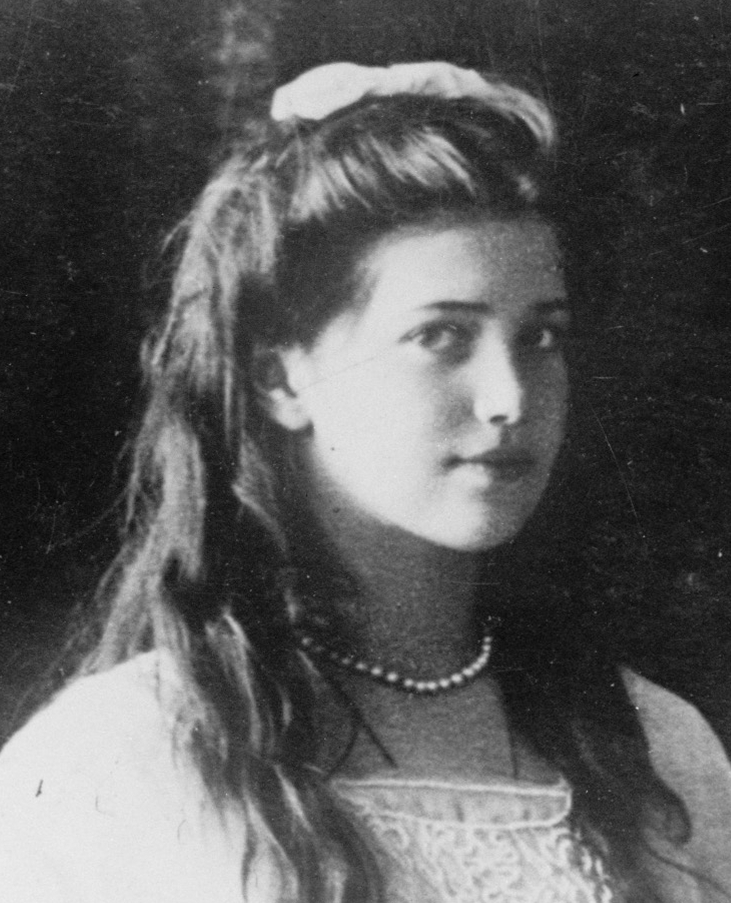
Grand Duchess Maria in 1914.

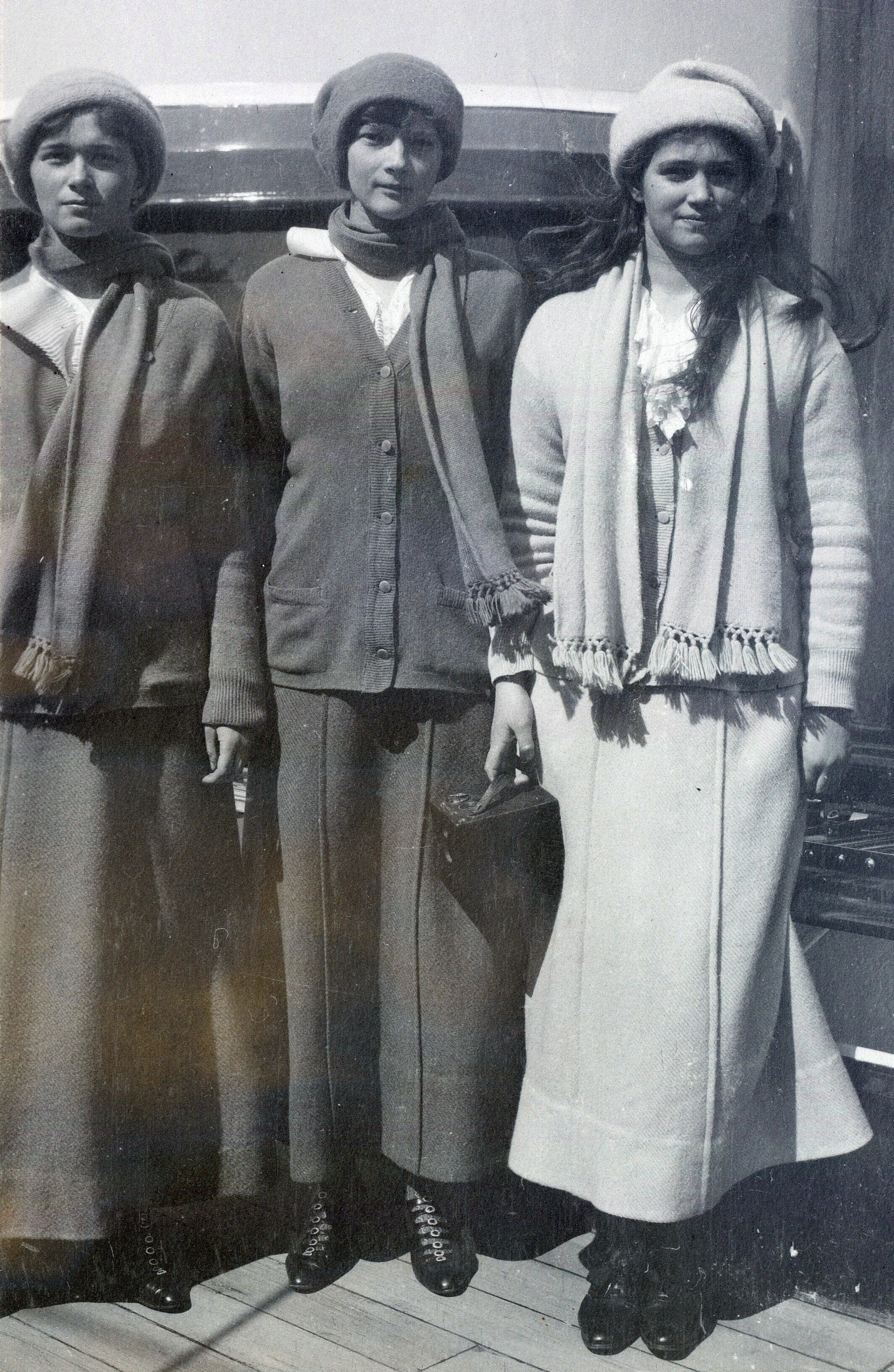
Grand Duchesses Olga, Tatiana and Maria aboard the imperial yacht in 1914. Courtesy: Beinecke Library.

One of the girls' governesses, Sofia Ivanovna Tyutcheva, was horrified in 1910 because Rasputin was permitted access to the nursery when the four girls were in their nightgowns. Tyutcheva wanted Rasputin barred from the nurseries. In response to Tyutcheva's complaints, Nicholas did ask Rasputin to end his nursery visits. "I am so afr(aid) that S.I. can speak ... about our friend something bad," Maria's twelve-year-old sister Tatiana wrote to her mother on 8 March 1910, after begging Alexandra to forgive her for doing something she did not like. "I hope our nurse will be nice to our friend now." Alexandra eventually had Tyutcheva fired.

Tyutcheva took her story to other members of the family, who were scandalized by the reports, though Rasputin's contacts with the children were by all accounts completely innocent. Nicholas's sister Grand Duchess Xenia Alexandrovna of Russia was horrified by Tyutcheva's story. She wrote on 15 March 1910 that she could not understand "...the attitude of Alix and the children to that sinister Grigory (whom they consider to be almost a saint, when in fact he's only a khlyst!) He's always there, goes into the nursery, visits Olga and Tatiana while they are getting ready for bed, sits there talking to them and caressing them. They are careful to hide him from Sofia Ivanovna, and the children don't dare talk to her about him. It's all quite unbelievable and beyond understanding."

Another of the nursery governesses claimed in the spring of 1910 that she was raped by Rasputin. Maria Ivanovna Vishnyakova had at first been a devotee of Rasputin, but later was disillusioned by him. The empress refused to believe Vishnyakova "and said that everything Rasputin does is holy". Grand Duchess Olga Alexandrovna was told that Vishnyakova's claim had been immediately investigated, but "they caught the young woman in bed with a Cossack of the Imperial Guard." Vishnyakova was dismissed from her post in 1913.

It was whispered in society that Rasputin had seduced not only the Tsarina but also the four grand duchesses. Rasputin had released ardent letters written to him by the Tsarina and the four grand duchesses. The letters circulated throughout society, fueling the rumors. Pornographic cartoons also circulated that depicted Rasputin having sexual relations with the empress, with her four daughters and Anna Vyrubova nude in the background. Nicholas ordered Rasputin to leave St. Petersburg for a time, much to Alexandra's displeasure, and Rasputin went on a pilgrimage to Palestine. Despite the scandal, the imperial family's association with Rasputin continued until Rasputin was murdered on 17 December 1916. "Our Friend is so contented with our girlies, says they have gone through heavy 'courses' for their age and their souls have much developed," Alexandra wrote to Nicholas on 6 December 1916. In his memoirs, A. A. Mordvinov reported that the four grand duchesses appeared "cold and visibly terribly upset" by Rasputin's death and sat "huddled up closely together" on a sofa in one of their bedrooms on the night they received the news. Mordvinov reported that the young women were in a gloomy mood and seemed to sense the political upheaval that was about to be unleashed. Rasputin was buried with an icon signed on its reverse side by Maria, her sisters, and mother. Maria attended Rasputin's funeral on 21 December 1916 and her family planned to build a church over his grave site.

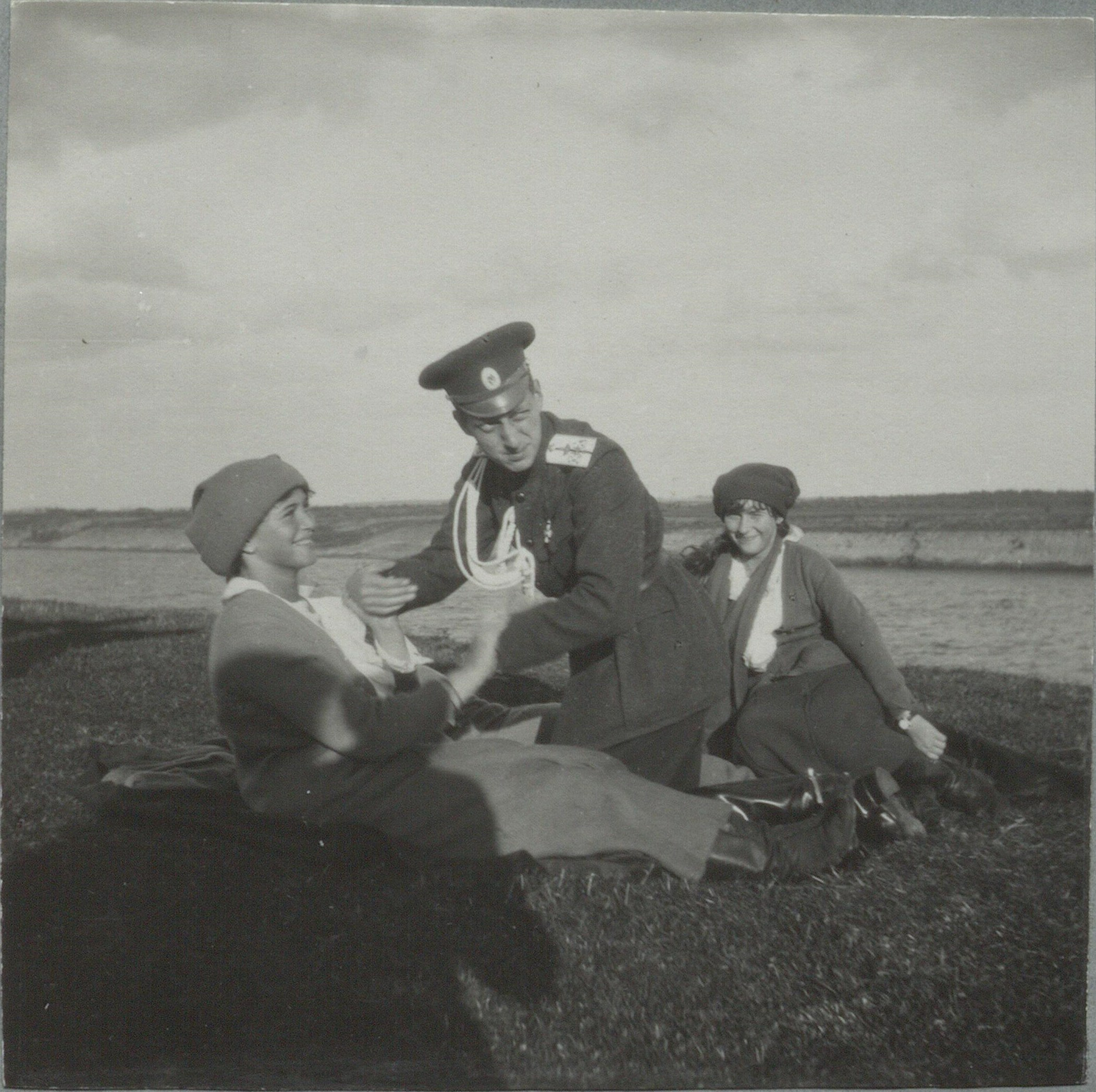
Grand Duchesses Maria, left, and Anastasia Nikolaevna roughhouse with their cousin Grand Duke Dmitri Pavlovich, c. 1916.

Maria, like her mother, was likely a carrier of the hemophilia gene and might have passed on the disease to another generation if she had survived to have the children she dreamed of. One of Alexandra's brothers and two of her nephews, as well as one of her maternal uncles and two children of one of her first cousins were all hemophiliacs, as was Maria's brother Alexei. Maria herself reportedly hemorrhaged in December 1914 during an operation to remove her tonsils, according to her paternal aunt Grand Duchess Olga Alexandrovna of Russia, who was interviewed later in her life. The doctor performing the operation was so unnerved that he had to be ordered to continue by Maria's mother, Tsarina Alexandra. Olga Alexandrovna said she believed all four of her nieces bled more than was normal and believed they were carriers of the hemophilia gene like their mother. Symptomatic carriers of the gene, while not hemophiliacs themselves, can have symptoms of hemophilia including a lower than normal blood clotting factor that can lead to heavy bleeding during childbirth or surgical procedures such as a tonsillectomy. DNA testing on the remains of the royal family proved in 2009 that Alexei suffered from hemophilia B, a rarer form of the disease. The same testing proved that his mother and one of the four Grand Duchesses were carriers. Russians identify the grand duchess who carried the gene as Anastasia, but American scientists identified the young woman as Maria.

== Revolution and captivity ==
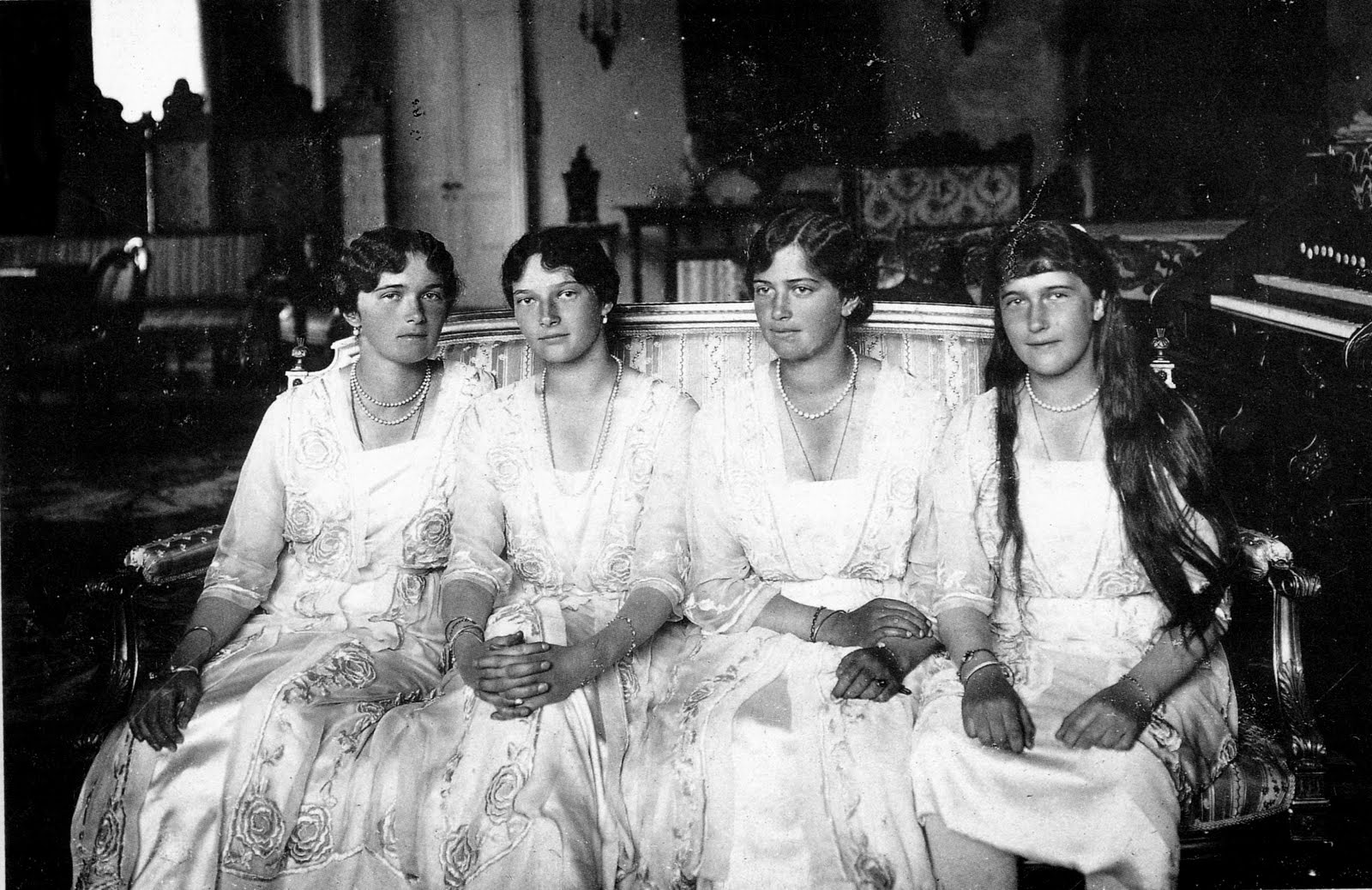
Grand Duchesses Olga, Tatiana, Maria and Anastasia in a formal portrait taken in 1916.

Revolution broke out in St. Petersburg in the spring of 1917. At the height of the chaos, Maria and her siblings were stricken with measles. The Tsarina was reluctant to move the children to the safety of the imperial residence at Gatchina, even though she was advised to do so. Maria was the last of the five to fall ill and, while she was still healthy, was a major source of support to her mother. Maria went outside with her mother on the night of 13 March 1917 to plead with the soldiers to remain loyal to the imperial family. Shortly afterwards, the seventeen-year-old fell ill with measles and virulent pneumonia and nearly died. She was not told that her father had abdicated the throne until after she began to recover.

The family was arrested and imprisoned, first in their home at Tsarskoye Selo and later at residences in Tobolsk and Yekaterinburg in Siberia. Maria attempted to befriend her guards both at Tsarskoye Selo and Tobolsk and soon learned their names and details about their wives and children. Unaware of her danger, she commented at Tobolsk that she would be happy to live there indefinitely if only she could take a walk outside without being guarded continuously. Still, she was aware that she was being watched constantly. Maria and her sister Anastasia burned most of their letters and diaries in April 1918 because they feared their possessions would be searched. None of Anastasia's diaries survived, but three of Maria's are still in existence: one from 1912, one from 1913, and one from 1916.

The family had been briefly separated in April 1918 when the Bolsheviks moved Nicholas, Alexandra, and Maria to Yekaterinburg. The girls decided amongst themselves that Maria would go with their parents. Olga was too emotionally unstable to be of much help, level-headed Tatiana was needed to watch over their ill brother, and Anastasia was considered too young. The rest of the children were left behind in Tobolsk because Maria's brother Alexei was ill with a severe hemophilia attack after which he would never walk again. The four other children joined their family in Yekaterinburg several weeks later.

In her letters to her siblings in Tobolsk, Maria described her unease at the new restrictions on the family at Yekaterinburg. She and her parents were searched by guards at the Ipatiev House and were warned they would be subject to further searches. A wooden fence was installed around the house, limiting their view of the street. "Oh, how complicated everything is now," she wrote on 2 May 1918. "We lived so peacefully for eight months and now it's all started again." Maria passed the time by attempting to befriend members of the Ipatiev House Guard. She showed them pictures from her photo albums and talked with them about their families and her own hopes for a new life in England if she was released. Alexander Strekotin, one of the guards, recalled in his memoirs that she "was a girl who loved to have fun". Another of the guards recalled Maria's buxom beauty with appreciation and said she did not assume an air of grandeur. One former sentry recalled that Maria was often scolded by her mother in "severe and angry whispers", apparently for being too friendly with the guards at Yekaterinburg. Strekotin wrote that their conversations always began with one of the girls saying, "We're so bored! In Tobolsk there was always something to do. I know! Try to guess the name of this dog!" The teenage girls walked by the sentries, whispering and giggling in a manner that the guards considered flirtatious.

In his memoirs, one guard recalled that on one occasion another guard forgot himself and told an off-color joke to the grand duchesses during one of these meetings. The offended Tatiana ran from the room, "pale as death". Maria eyed the man and said, "Why are you not disgusted with yourselves when you use such shameful words? Do you imagine that you can woo a well-born woman with such witticisms and have her be well disposed towards you? Be refined and respectable men and then we can get along." Ivan Kleschev, a 21-year-old guard, declared that he intended to marry one of the grand duchesses and if her parents said no he would rescue her from the Ipatiev House himself.

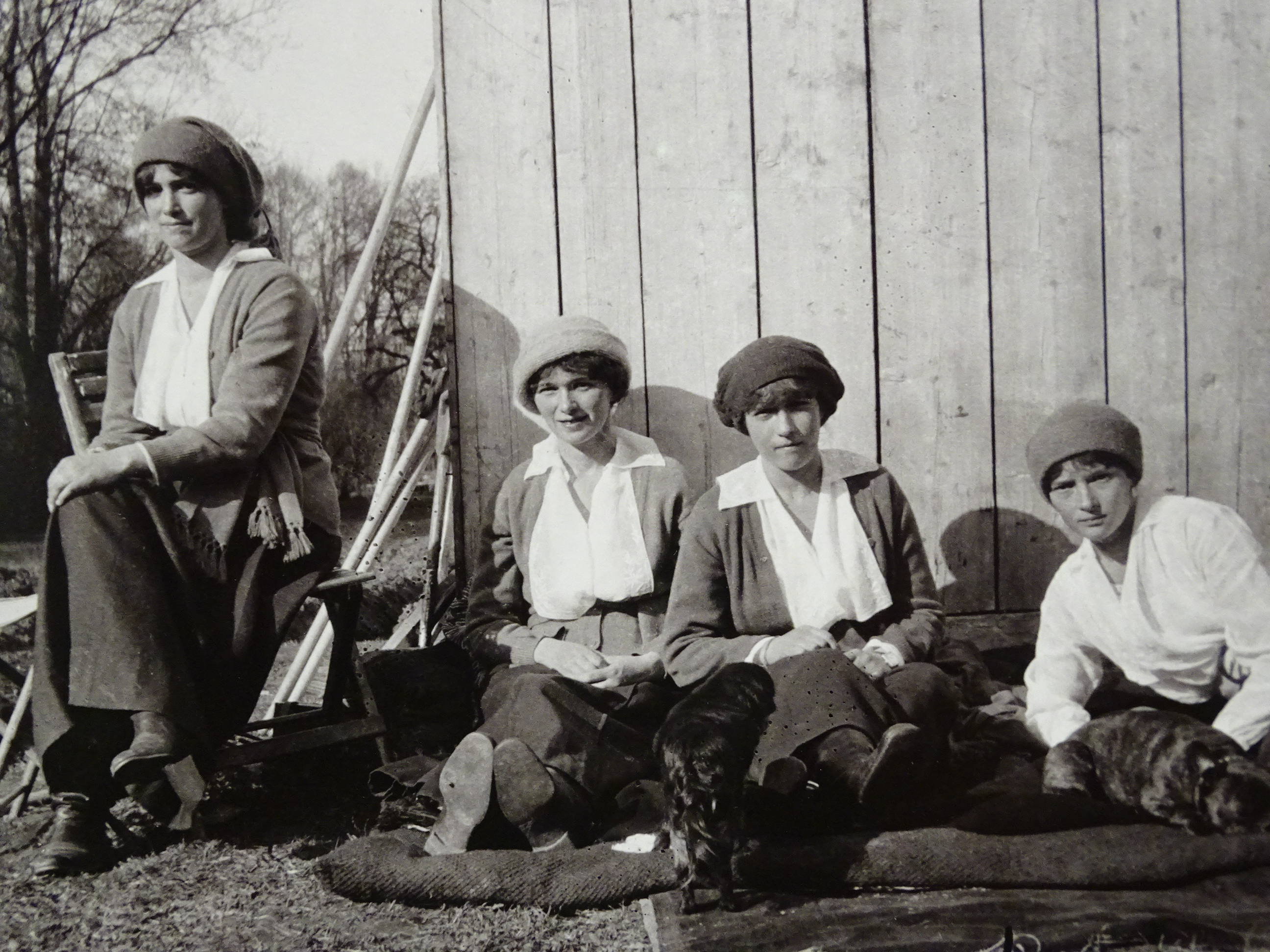
From left to right, Grand Duchesses Maria, Olga, Anastasia, and Tatiana Nikolaevna in captivity at Tsarskoe Selo in spring 1917.

It has been alleged by Greg King and Penny Wilson that Ivan Skorokhodov, yet another of the guards, smuggled in a birthday cake to celebrate Maria's nineteenth birthday on 26 June 1918. They continued in their claim that Maria slipped away from the group with Ivan Skorokhodov for a private moment and they were discovered together in a compromising position when two of his superiors conducted a surprise inspection of the house. They further alleged Skorokhodov was removed from his position after his actions and friendliness towards the grand duchess were discovered by his commanding officers and that several guards reported that both the Tsarina and her older sister Olga appeared angry with Maria in the days following the incident and that Olga avoided her company.

However, the claim has been contested by Helen Azar and George Hawkins (based on information provided by Margarita Nelipa), who dismiss the story as a myth being based in "absolutely no first-hand evidence". The authors' note that the story seems to originate from proven unreliable accounts of the executioner Peter Ermakov. Skorokhodov, in fact, left the Ipatiev House due to "illness and hospitalization rather than dismissal". They further report that any minor violation by the guards would result in being imprisoned in a local jail, adding to the unlikeness of the story. Moreover, Azar and Hawkins note there is no evidence of Alexandra and Olga being angry with Maria, reporting the myth stems from a misconstrued passage in the Yurovsky note. The original note, in place of an alleged implication that an "imperial soul" needed passage for inappropriate behavior, reports that the Deacon actually said "This is what happened before and not with such important people. If one messed it up, it can cause a scandal, but in this situation, we can sort it out in good spirit." This was in response to Yurovsky telling the Deacon that he could perform service but not converse with the imperial family. Consequently, the passage cited by King and Wilson as evidence of Maria being shunned is based on nothing more "than perhaps faulty translation in the original publication that referenced the alleged incident".

On 14 July 1918, local priests at Yekaterinburg conducted a private church service for the family and reported that Maria and her family, contrary to custom, fell on their knees during the prayer for the dead. The following day, on 15 July, Maria and her sisters appeared in good spirits as they joked with one another and moved the beds in their room so visiting cleaning women could scrub the floor. They got down on their hands and knees to help the women and whispered to them when the guards were not looking. All four young women wore long black skirts and white silk blouses, the same clothing they had worn the previous day. Their short hair was "tumbled and disorderly". They boasted that Maria was so strong she could lift Alexei and told the women how much they enjoyed physical exertion and wished there was more of it for them to do in the Ipatiev House. On the afternoon of 16 July 1918, the last full day of her life, Maria walked in the garden with her father and sisters and the guards observed nothing unusual in the family's spirits. As the family was eating dinner that night, Yakov Yurovsky, the head of the detachment, came in and announced that the family's kitchen boy and Alexei's playmate, 14-year-old Leonid Sednev, must gather his things and go to a family member. The boy had actually been sent to a hotel across the street because the guards did not want to kill him along with the rest of the Romanov party. The family, unaware of the plan to kill them, was upset and unsettled by Sednev's absence, which came after five other members of their detachment had already been sent away. Dr. Botkin and Tatiana went that evening to Yurovsky's office, for what was to be the last time, to ask for the return of the kitchen boy who kept Alexei amused during the long hours of captivity. Yurovsky placated them by telling her the boy would return soon, but the family was unconvinced.

== Death ==
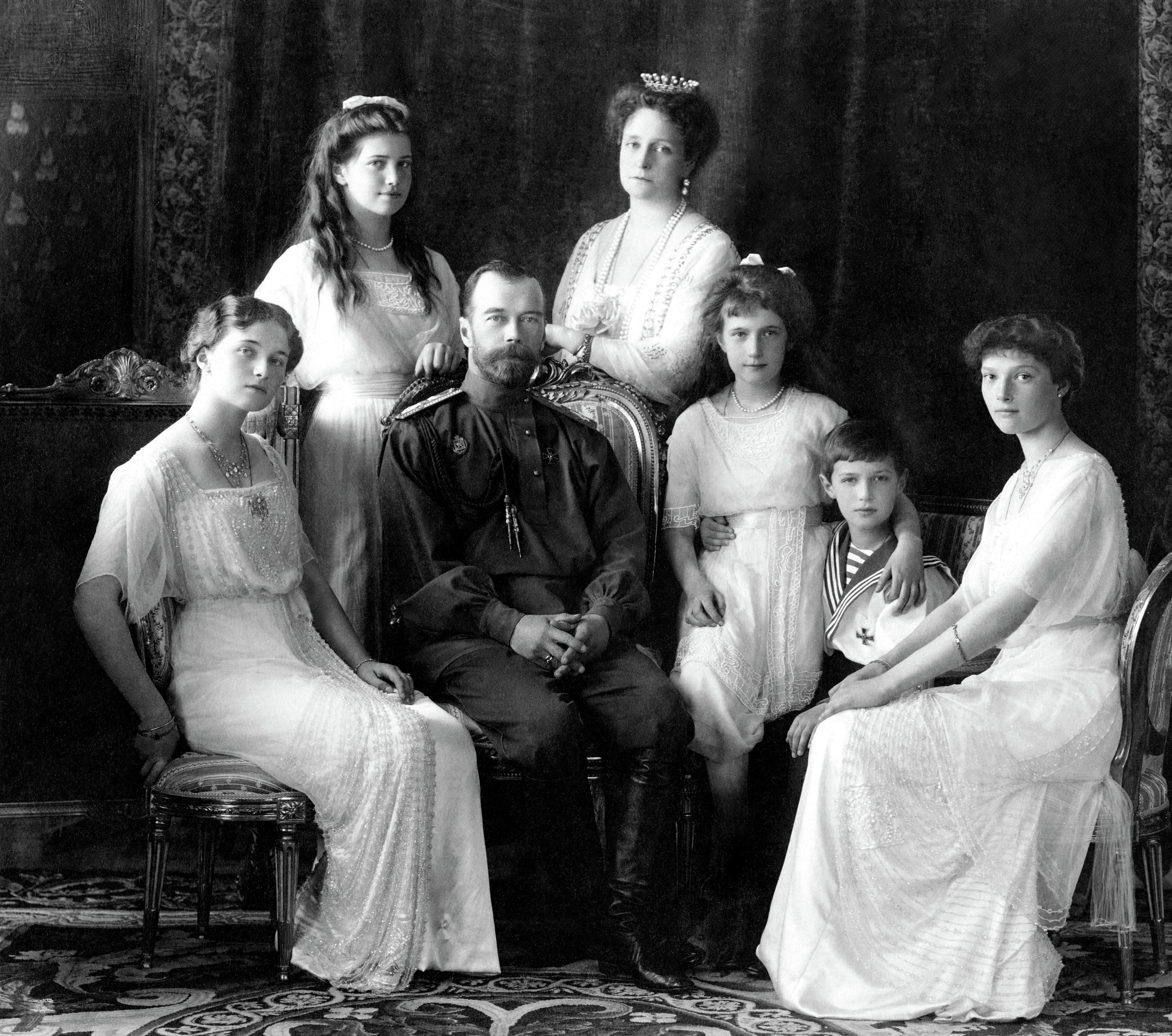
Russian Imperial Family, 1913

Late that night, on the night of 16 July, the family was awakened and told to come down to the lower level of the house because there was unrest in the town at large and they would have to be moved for their own safety. The family emerged from their rooms carrying pillows, bags, and other items to make Alexandra and Alexei comfortable. Anastasia carried one of the family's three dogs, a King Charles Spaniel named Jimmy. The family paused and crossed themselves when they saw the stuffed mother bear and cubs that stood on the landing, perhaps as a sign of respect for the dead. Nicholas told the servants and family "Well, we're going to get out of this place." They asked questions of the guards but did not appear to suspect they were going to be killed. Yurovsky, who had been a professional photographer, directed the family to take different positions as a photographer might. Alexandra, who had requested chairs for herself and Alexei, sat to her son's left. The Tsar stood behind Alexei, Dr. Botkin stood to the Tsar's right, Maria and her sisters stood behind Alexandra along with the servants. They were left for approximately half an hour while further preparations were made. The group said little during this time, but Alexandra whispered to the girls in English, violating the guards' rules that they must speak in Russian. Yurovsky came in, ordered them to stand, and read the sentence of execution. Maria and her family had time only to utter a few incoherent sounds of shock or protest before the death squad under Yurovsky's command began shooting. It was the early hours of 17 July 1918.

The first volley of gunfire killed the Tsar, the Empress and two male servants, and wounded the family's doctor and the empress' maidservant. Maria tried to escape through the doors at the rear of the room, which led to a storage area, but the doors were nailed shut. The noise as she rattled the doors attracted the attention of the drunken military commissar Peter Ermakov. A heavy layer of smoke had accumulated in the room from the gunfire and from plaster dust released from the walls by errant bullets, and the gunmen could see only the lower bodies of those who were still alive. Ermakov fired at Maria, and his bullet struck her in the thigh. She fell to the floor with Anastasia and Demidova and lay there moaning. The assassins then left the room for several minutes to let the haze clear, and when they returned they killed Dr Botkin, Tsarevich Alexei and Grand Duchesses Olga and Tatiana. Ermakov then turned on the wounded Maria and Anastasia, who was still unharmed. Any claim that he tried to stab Maria with his bayonet but failed because of the jewels sewn in her clothing is, however, doubtful. When the Tsar and Empress were removed from Tobolsk to Yekaterinburg in April 1918, they took Maria with them. It was while the other three sisters were left behind in Tobolsk that the jewels were sewn into their clothing; but since Maria was not with them then, her clothing contained no jewels and none were found in her garments after the murders. So there could not have been any obstacle to Ermakov's bayonet, had he tried to stab Maria. He said he finally shot her in the head. But the skull that is almost certainly Maria's has no bullet wound. Perhaps the drunken Ermakov inflicted a scalp wound, knocking her unconscious and producing a copious flow of blood, leading Ermakov to think he had killed her. He then struggled with Anastasia, whom he also claimed he shot in the head. As the bodies were removed from the house, one of the Grand Duchesses regained consciousness and screamed. Ermakov tried to stab this Grand Duchess again but failed and struck her in the face until she was silent. The facial area of Maria's skull was indeed destroyed, but Yurovsky wrote that the victims' faces were shattered with rifle butts at the burial site, not in the Ipatiev basement. Maria unquestionably died with her family, but the exact cause of her death is uncertain and a possibility remains that the sister who woke and screamed was Maria and not (as is usually said) Anastasia.

== Claims of survival ==
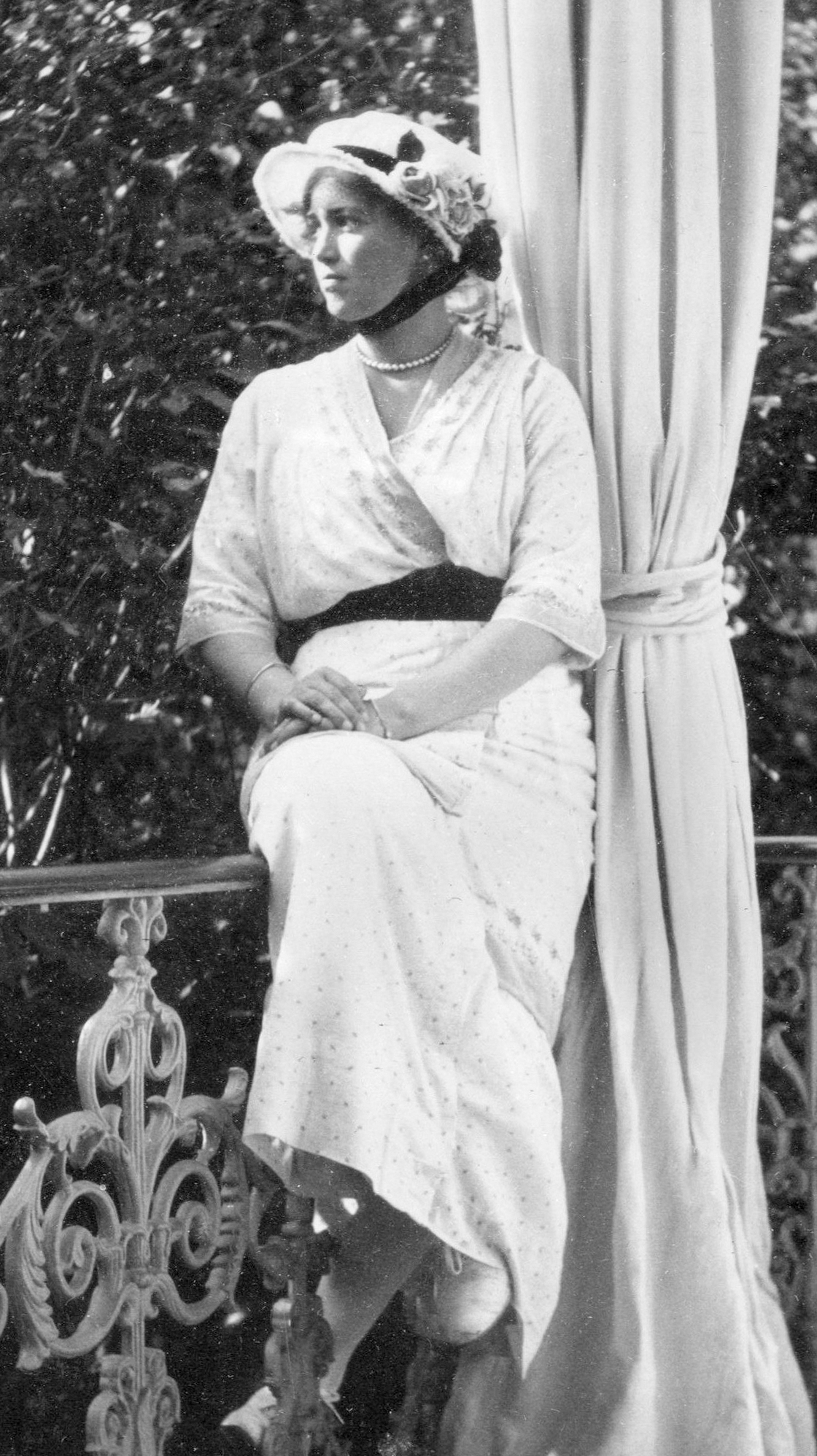
Grand Duchess Maria in 1915.

For decades (until all the bodies were found and identified, see below) conspiracy theorists suggested that one or more of the family somehow survived the slaughter. Several people claimed to be surviving members of the Romanov family following the assassinations.

According to the conspiracists, there may have been an opportunity for one or more of the guards to rescue a supposed survivor(s). Yurovsky demanded that the guards come to his office and turn over items they had stolen following the assassinations. There was reportedly a span of time when the bodies of the victims were left largely unattended in the truck, in the basement, and in the corridor of the house. Some guards who had not participated in the murders and had been sympathetic to the grand duchesses were left in the basement with the bodies.

At least two of the Grand Duchesses were speculated to have survived the initial attack on the Imperial Family. Two of the Grand Duchesses, Maria and Anastasia, "sat up screaming" when they were being carried out to a waiting truck. They were then attacked again. There were claims made that Maria survived. A man named Alex Brimeyer claimed to be Maria's grandson "Prince Alexis d'Anjou de Bourbon-Condé Romanov-Dolgoruky". He said Maria had escaped to Romania, married and had a daughter, Olga-Beata. Olga-Beata then allegedly married and had a son named "Prince Alexis". Brimeyer was sentenced to 18 months in prison by a Belgian court after he was sued in 1971 by the Dolgoruky family and the Association of Descendants of the Russian Nobility of Belgium. Two young women who claimed to be Maria and her sister Anastasia were taken in by a priest in the Ural Mountains in 1919, where they lived as nuns until their deaths in 1964. They were buried under the names Anastasia and Maria Nikolaevna.

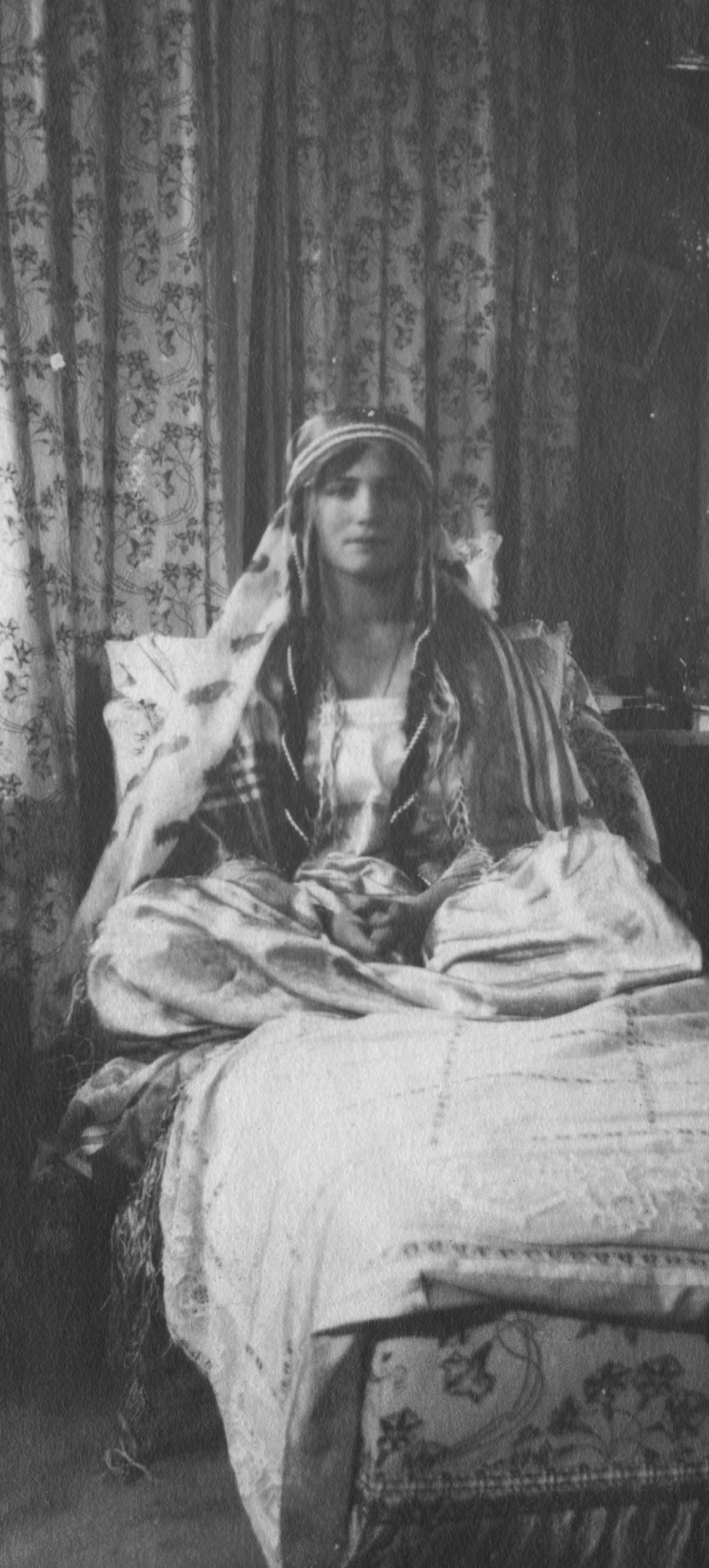
Maria Nikolaevna Romanova in costume at the Alexander Palace, 1916

As late as 2004, Gabriel Louis Duval wrote a book, A Princess in the Family, claiming that his foster grandmother "Granny Alina" might have been the Grand Duchess Maria. According to Duval, Granny Alina married a man named Frank and emigrated to South Africa. She later lived with his family before dying in 1969. Her body was exhumed, but DNA was too degraded to be useful in determining whether she shared DNA with the imperial family. Most historians continued (later proven right) to discount the claims that Maria or any other member of the family survived the killings.

== Romanov graves and DNA proof ==
In 1991, bodies believed to be those of the Imperial Family and their servants were finally exhumed from a mass grave in the woods outside Yekaterinburg. The grave had been found nearly a decade earlier, but was kept hidden by its discoverers from the Communists who still ruled Russia when the grave was originally found. Once the grave was opened, the excavators realized that instead of eleven sets of remains (Tsar Nicholas II, Tsarina Alexandra, Tsarevitch Alexei, the four Grand Duchesses, Olga, Tatiana, Maria and Anastasia; the family's doctor, Yevgeny Botkin; their valet, Alexei Trupp; their cook, Ivan Kharitonov; and Alexandra's maid, Anna Demidova) the grave held only nine. Alexei and, according to the late forensic expert Dr. William Maples, Anastasia were missing from the family's grave. Russian scientists contested this, however, and claimed it was Maria's body that was missing. The Russians identified Anastasia by using a computer program to compare photos of the youngest Grand Duchess with the skulls of the victims from the mass grave. They estimated the height and width of the skulls where pieces of bone were missing. American scientists found this method inexact. A Russian forensic expert said none of the skulls attributed to the Grand Duchesses had a gap between the front teeth as Maria did.

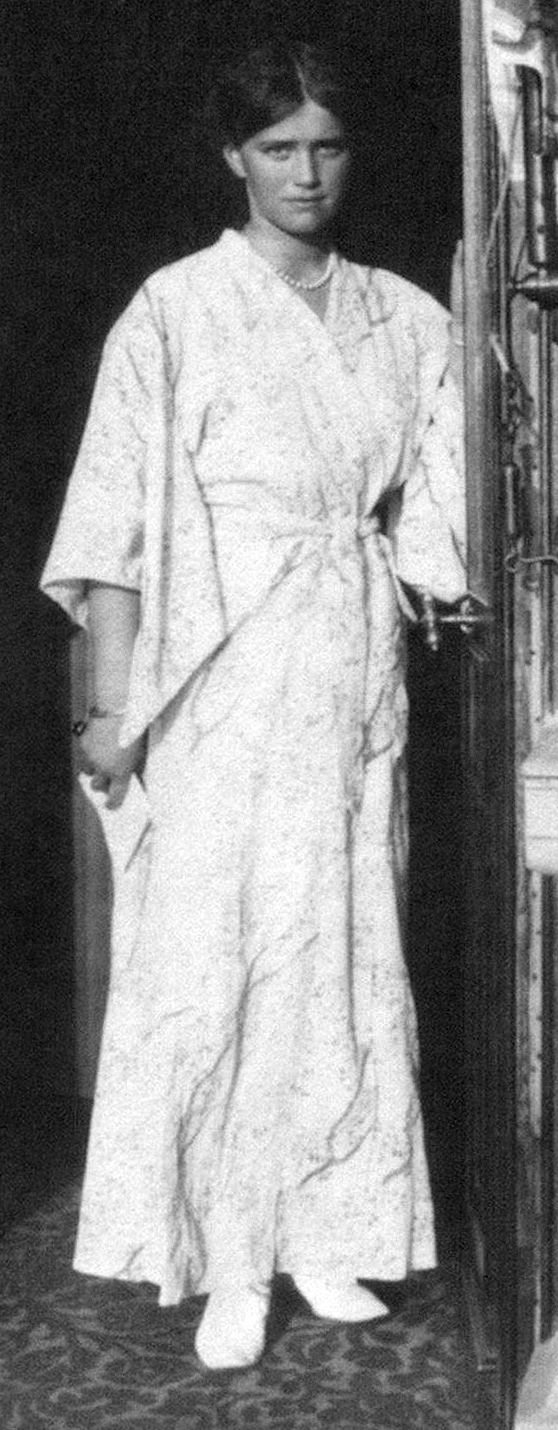
Grand Duchess Maria wearing a kimono-style dressing gown c. 1915.

American scientists thought the missing body to be Anastasia because none of the female skeletons showed the evidence of immaturity, such as an immature collarbone, undescended wisdom teeth, or immature vertebrae in the back, that they would have expected to find in the seventeen-year-old Anastasia. In 1998, when the bodies of the Imperial Family were finally interred, a body measuring approximately 5 feet 7 inches was buried under the name of Anastasia. Photographs taken of the four sisters up until six months before the murders demonstrate that Maria was several inches taller than Anastasia and was also taller than her sister Olga. However, the heights of the skeletons had to be estimated because some of the bones had been cut and portions of the skeletons were missing. Since teeth and large portions of the jaw were missing in several of the skeletons, the Russian scientists' assertion that Anastasia's remains rather than those of Maria were in the grave because none of the skeletons had a gap between the front teeth also appeared questionable to American scientists.

The mitochondrial DNA from the skeletons was compared against mitochondrial DNA from relatives of the imperial family in the maternal line of descent, including the Tsarina's great-nephew Prince Philip, Duke of Edinburgh, and was found to be a match. Scientists believed that the matching DNA was enough to identify the remains of the Imperial Family and their servants. The "Yurovsky Note", a report filed by commander Yakov Yurovsky with his superiors following the murders, stated that two of the bodies were removed from the main grave and cremated at an undisclosed area. If the Whites ever discovered the grave, Yurovsky believed they would doubt the grave belonged to the Tsar and his retinue because the body count would be incorrect. Some forensic experts believe the complete burning of two bodies in so short a time would have been impossible given the environment and materials possessed by Yurovsky and his men. Initial searches of the area in subsequent years failed to turn up a cremation site or the remains of the two missing Romanov children.

However, on 23 August 2007, a Russian archaeologist announced the discovery of two burned, partial skeletons at a bonfire site near Yekaterinburg that appeared to match the site described in Yurovsky's memoirs. The archaeologists said the bones were from a boy who was roughly between the ages of twelve and fifteen years at the time of his death and of a young woman who was roughly between the ages of fifteen and nineteen years old. Maria was nineteen years, one month old at the time of the assassinations while her sister Anastasia was seventeen years, one month old and her brother Alexei was less than a month shy of his fourteenth birthday. Maria's elder sisters Olga and Tatiana were twenty-two and twenty-one years old at the time of the assassinations. Along with the remains of the two bodies, archaeologists found "shards of a container of sulfuric acid, nails, metal strips from a wooden box, and bullets of various caliber". The bones were found using metal detectors and metal rods as probes.

Preliminary testing indicated a "high degree of probability" that the remains belong to the Tsarevich Alexei and to one of his sisters, Russian forensic scientists announced on 22 January 2008. The testing began in late December 2007. On 30 April 2008, Russian forensic scientists announced that DNA testing proves that the remains belong to the Tsarevich Alexei and to a young woman the Russians continue to identify as Maria. Eduard Rossel, governor of the region 900 miles east of Moscow, said tests done by a U.S. laboratory had identified the shards as those of Alexei and Maria. In March 2009, results of the DNA testing were published, confirming that the two bodies discovered in 2007 were those of Tsarevich Alexei and one of the four Grand Duchesses.

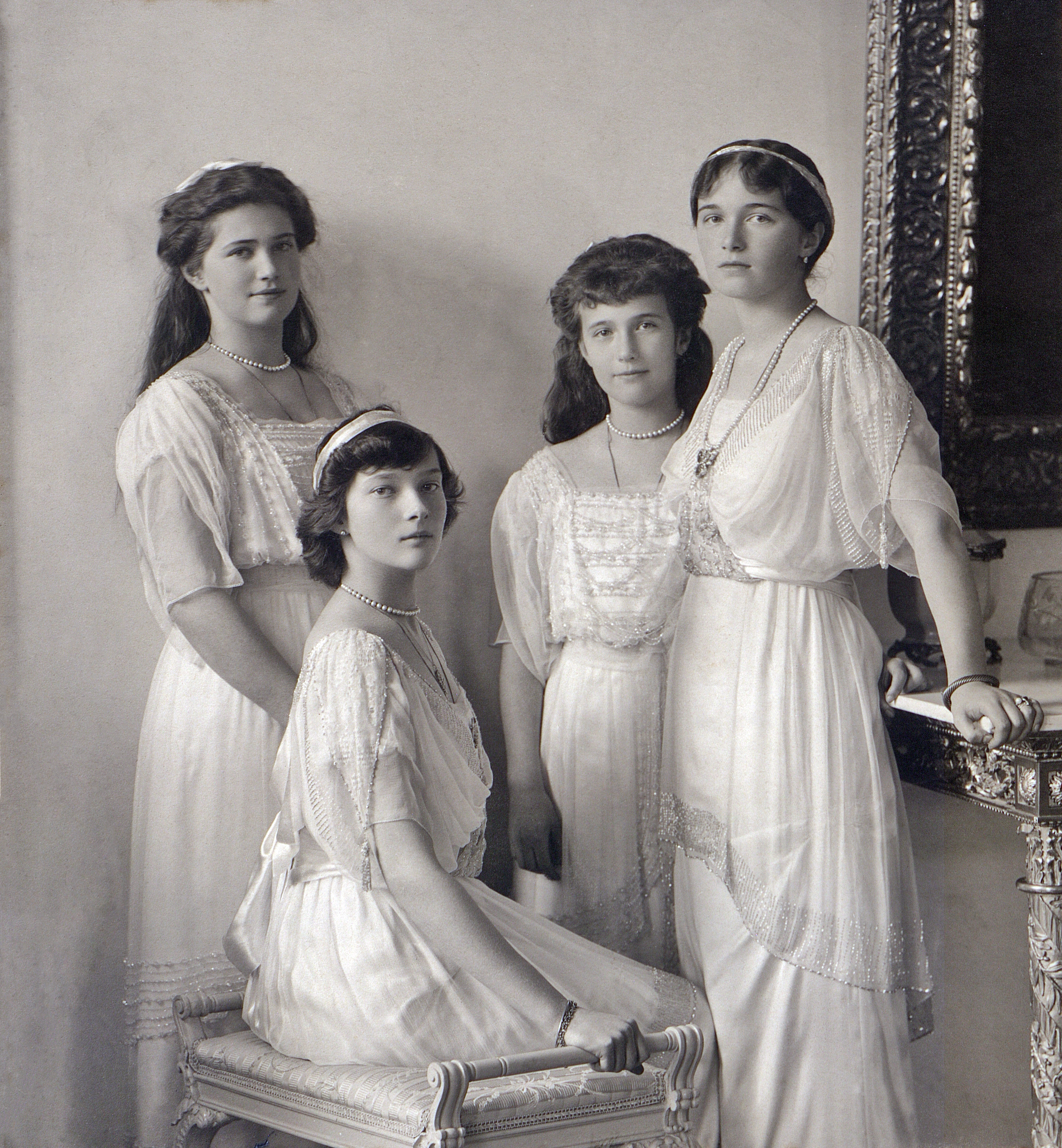
OTMA in 1914

"This has confirmed that indeed it is the children," he said. "We have now found the entire family."

On 11 September 2015, it was announced that the remains of Maria and Alexei, which had been in storage in the state archives for 8 years, were to be buried alongside their family on 18 October 2015. However, the Russian Government has given the Russian Orthodox Church permission to do one last DNA test of the two Romanov children against DNA from a blood stained cloth from their great-grandfather Emperor Alexander II, who was killed by a bomb, and their aunt Grand Duchess Elizabeth Feodorovna.

Nicholas II and Alexandra Feodorovna were exhumed from their tombs in September 2015 to confirm links to other relatives. This test was done so the Church and a branch of the Romanov line could set aside their doubts. The burial of what now are considered to be Maria's and Alexei's remains, to be with those of the family, was planned for 2015 but has been delayed mainly due to the insistence of the Russian Orthodox Church on more DNA-testing.

== Sainthood ==
Saint Maria Romanova

Grand Duchess and Passion bearer (Note: Title used for Romanov Saints by Moscow Patriarchate) or Martyr (Note: Title used for Romanov Saints by ROCOR)
- Venerated in: Russian Orthodox Church
- Canonized: 1981 by Russian Orthodox Church Abroad; 2000 by Russian Orthodox Church
- Major shrine: Church on Blood, Yekaterinburg, Russia
- Feast: 17 July

In 2000, Maria and her family were canonized as passion bearers by the Russian Orthodox Church. The family had previously been canonized in 1981 by the Russian Orthodox Church Abroad as holy martyrs. The bodies of Tsar Nicholas II, Tsarina Alexandra, and three of their daughters were finally interred at St. Peter and Paul Cathedral in St. Petersburg on 17 July 1998, eighty years after they were murdered.

== Bibliography ==
- Azar, Helen and Hawkins, George. "Maria Romanov: Third Daughter of the Last Tsar, Diaries and Letters, 1908–1918." Westholme Publishing, 2019. ISBN 978-1594163227, pp. 231–232.
- Bokhanov, Alexander, Knodt, Dr. Manfred, Oustimenko, Vladimir, Peregudova, Zinaida, and Tyutyunnik, Lyubov (1993). The Romanovs: Love, Power, and Tragedy. Leppi Publications. ISBN 0-9521644-0-X.
- Christopher, Peter, Kurth, Peter, and Radzinsky, Edvard (1995) Tsar: The Lost World of Nicholas and Alexandra. Little Brown and Co. ISBN 0-316-50787-3.
- Hawkins, George. Correspondence of the Russian Grand Duchesses: Letters of the Daughters of the Last Tsar Amazon 2020. ISBN 979-8571453486.
- King, Greg and Wilson, Penny (2003) The Fate of the Romanovs. John Wiley and Sons, Inc. ISBN 0-471-20768-3.
- Klier, John and Mingay, Helen (1995). The Quest for Anastasia: Solving the Mystery of the Last Romanovs. Birch Lane Press Book. ISBN 1-55972-442-0.
- Kurth, Peter (1983). Anastasia: The Riddle of Anna Anderson. Back Bay Books. ISBN 0-316-50717-2.
- Mager, Hugo (1998). Elizabeth: Grand Duchess of Russia. Caroll and Graf Publishers, Inc. ISBN 0-7867-0678-3.
- Massie, Robert K. (1967). Nicholas and Alexandra. Dell Publishing Co. ISBN 0-440-16358-7.
- Massie, Robert K. (1995). The Romanovs: The Final Chapter. Random House. ISBN 0-394-58048-6.
- Maylunas, Andrei and Mironenko, Sergei, editors; Darya Galy, translator (1997). A Lifelong Passion: Nicholas and Alexandra: Their Own Story. Doubleday, ISBN 0-385-48673-1.
- Rappaport, Helen (2008). The Last Days of the Romanovs. St. Martin's Griffin. ISBN 978-0-312-60347-2.
- * Rappaport, Helen. "The Romanov Sisters: The Lost Lives of the Daughters of Nicholas and Alexandra." St. Martin's Griffin, 2014. ISBN 978-1250067456
- Radzinsky, Edvard (1992). The Last Tsar. Doubleday. ISBN 0-385-42371-3.
- Radzinsky, Edvard (2000). The Rasputin File. Doubleday. ISBN 0-385-48909-9.
- Vorres, Ian (1965), The Last Grand Duchess, Scribner. ASIN B0007E0JK0, p. 115.
- Silke Ellenbeck: Ich wollte einen Soldaten heiraten und zwanzig Kinder bekommen – Maria Romanow – die dritte Tochter des letzten Zaren Nikolaus II., DeBehr Verlag, Radeberg 2015, ISBN 978-3-95753-220-6.
