= Dehne =

Dehne is a German surname. Notable people with the surname include:

- Frank Dehne (born 1976), German volleyball player
- Miriam Dehne (born 1968), German film director, screenwriter and author
- Philipp Dehne (born 1984), German politician

== See also ==
- Dehn (disambiguation)
- Dəhnə (disambiguation)
