= Dehn =

Dehn is a surname. Some notable people with this surname include:

- Adolf Dehn (1895–1968), American lithographer
- Angelina Dehn (born 1995), a.k.a. Ängie, Swedish singer
- Günther Dehn (1882–1970), German theologian
- Lili Dehn (1888–1963), Russian writer
- Max Dehn (1878–1952), German-American mathematician
- Megan Dehn (born 1974), now Megan Anderson, Australian netballer
- Mura Dehn (1905–1987), American filmmaker
- Olive Dehn (1914–2007), English children's writer and poet
- Paul Dehn (1912–1976), British screenwriter
- Raymond Dehn (born 1957), American politician
- Siegfried Dehn (1777–1858), German musicologist
- Virginia Dehn (1922–2005), American painter
- Werner Dehn (1889–1960), German rower

== See also ==
- Dehne
- Dehns
