= Dakhna =

Dakhna may refer to:

- Dakhna, Pakistan, village in Khyber-Pakhtunkhwa province of Pakistan
- An alternate spelling of Dəhnə (disambiguation), the name of several communities in Azerbaijan
