= Sofia Tyutcheva =

Governess to daughters of Nicholas II of Russia

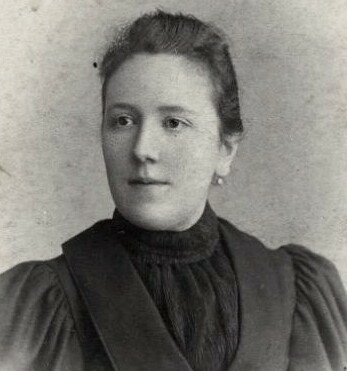
- Born: 3 March 1870; Smolensk
- Died: 31 August 1957 (aged 87); Muranovo
- Noble family: Tyutchev
- Father: Ivan Fedorovich Tyutchev
- Mother: Olga Nikolaevna Putyat
- Occupation: Teacher

Sofia Ivanovna Tyutcheva (3 March 1870, Smolensk – 31 August 1957, Muranovo) was a granddaughter of Fyodor Tyutchev, maid of honour, and teacher of the daughters of Nikolai II of Russia.

== Biography ==
Sofia was born the eldest daughter of the statesman and public figure Ivan Feodorvich Tyutchev (1846-1909), the son of poet Fyodor Tyutchev, and Olga Nikolaevna (nee Putyata, 1840-1920). She was born in Smolensk, where her father served in the Chamber of Criminal and Civil courts, and then as an associate prosecutor in the Smolensk District Court. In 1872, Ivan Tyutchev was appointed a member of the Moscow District Court, and in 1875, he was elected magistrate of the Dmitrov district of Moscow province. From that time on, the family lived permanently in Muranovo.

She received an education at home. In 1896, Tyutcheva was made a maid of honour to Empress Alexandra Feodorovna. Distinguished by her active and hardworking character, in her free time from duties, she worked in various charitable institutions under the patronage of Grand Duchess Elizabeth Feodorovna. During the Russo-Japanese War, she was in charge of accounting for a warehouse at the Special Committee for Assistance to Soldiers in the Grand Kremlin Palace, where donations for the welfare of the soldiers were collected. She also worked for the Society for the Care of Children of Poor Parents.

In January 1907, Tyutcheva was appointed as a governess for the daughters of Nikolai II and held this position until June 1912. She would later record her memories from this time with the Imperial family in 1945, which were published in 1997.

According to contemporaries who knew her personally, she was direct, honest, and democratic. She knew how to endure all surprises of fate and stand firmly on her feet. She combined great intelligence, independence of judgement, dedication, and love for children. One contemporary wrote:

"She did not obey the demands of her elders, she led her own line with the royal children. It is possible that her educational direction was more rational, but it was not her taste, and she persisted, like all the Tyutchevs, she was stubborn and persistent."

In 1912, Tyutcheva was fired. According to her, this was because she had seen Grigori Rasputin, enter the room of the grand duchesses without permission, where they were dressed in nightgowns, and bless them for bed, which she then reported to the Emperor. Lili Dehn, friend of the Empress, describes this differently:

"Mademoiselle Tyutcheva was never the governess of Their Highnesses and could not see Rasputin blessing them, since this did not happen. The Emperor would not have allowed this to happen even if Her Majesty had wished it. Well, the Empress did not at all believe that such a procedure was necessary to save the souls of her daughters. And Tyutcheva became a victim of her own arrogance and envy."

According to Dehn, Sofia Tyutcheva had an unyielding, quarrelsome character, and promoted rumours to justify her dismissal. Ultimately, her constant dissatisfaction led to the Empress dismissing her. Upon her dismissal, the Empress gifted Tyutcheva a hyacinth brooch with diamonds, and invited her to court whenever she was in Saint Petersburg. At this time, the faction against Rasputin was in full swing, so this claim, whether fictitious or not, was circulated with enthusiasm.

After her dismissal, Tyutcheva returned to Muranovo where she was involved in the local community. She was a godmother of many peasant children, and financially supported families in trouble. She was also involved in raising peasant children who studied at the Muranovo school founded by her father. In 1920, through the efforts of her brother, Nikolai Ivanovich Tyutchev, a museum was opened in the estate house. Sofia Ivanovna took part in the analysis of the extensive family archive and the composition of files. She tended to the park and garden, having almost lost her sight in old age. Sofia Ivanovna was a deeply religious person. Until the closure of the Church of the Saviour Not Made by Hands in Muranova, she took an active part in parish life. From the memoirs of her nephew N.V. Pigarev, it is known that "in the post-revolutionary years, naturally, there were no cleaners in the church. The order in the temple and all the cleaning was done by Aunt Sofia Ivanovna."

Sofia Ivanovna Tyutcheva died on 31 August 1957, at the age of 87, in Muranovo. She was buried in the nearby village of Rakhmanovo.
