= Dəhnə =

Dəhnə or Dakhna or Dekhna or Dakhne or Degne may refer to:

- Böyük Dəhnə, Azerbaijan
- Kiçik Dəhnə, Azerbaijan
- Dəhnə, Davachi, Azerbaijan
- Dəhnə, Quba, Azerbaijan
- Gömürdəhnə, Azerbaijan
