= Puçuq =

- Location within Azerbaijan
- Coordinates: 41°03′54″N 48°40′58″E
- Country: Azerbaijan
- Rayon: Quba
- Municipality: Gömürdəhnə
- Time zone: UTC+4 (AZT)
  - Summer (DST): UTC+5 (AZT)

Puçuq (also, Pucuq, Puçub, and Puchuk) is a village in the Quba Rayon of Azerbaijan. The village forms part of the municipality of Gömürdəhnə.
