= Dakhna, Pakistan =

Coordinates: 31°47′N 70°42′E

Dakhna is a village located in west of Dera Ismail Khan District in Khyber-Pakhtunkhwa province of Pakistan. It is located at 31°47'17N 70°42'17E with an altitude of 171 metres (564) near the village of Lok.
