= Püstəqasım =

- Municipality
- Location within Azerbaijan
- Coordinates: 41°16′02″N 48°35′03″E
- Country: Azerbaijan
- District: Quba

Population
  - Total: 1,841
- Time zone: UTC+4 (AZT)
  - Summer (DST): UTC+5 (AZT)

Püstəqasım (also, Pustagasym and Pustagasim) is a village and municipality in the Quba District of Azerbaijan. It has a population of 1,841. The municipality consists of the villages of Püstəqasım, Güneyməhlə, and Dəhnə.
