= Covrurah =

Village in Davachi Rayon, Azerbaijan

Covrurah (also, Çovurah) is a village in the municipality of Çuxurəzəmi in the Davachi Rayon of Azerbaijan.
