= Philipp Dehne =

German politician (born 1984)

Member of the Berlin House of Representatives
- Assuming office 29 October 2026
- Succeeding: Susanna Kahlefeld
- Constituency: Neukölln 2

Personal details
- Born: 1984 (age 41–42)
- Party: Die Linke (since 2018)

Philipp-Martin Dehne (born 1984) is a German politician who was elected member of the Berlin House of Representatives in 2026. From 2021 to 2026, he was a borough councillor of Neukölln.
