= Çuxurazəmi =

- Municipality
- Location within Azerbaijan
- Coordinates: 40°57′59″N 48°48′44″E
- Country: Azerbaijan
- Rayon: Davachi

Population
  - Total: 287
- Time zone: UTC+4 (AZT)
  - Summer (DST): UTC+5 (AZT)

Çuxurazəmi (also, Çuxrəzəmi, Çuxurəzəmi, Chukhurazami, and Chukhur-Zami) is a village and municipality in the Davachi Rayon of Azerbaijan. It has a population of 287. The municipality consists of the villages of Çuxurəzəmi, Qızılqazma, Qəriblik, Dəhnə, Covrurah, and Zöhrabkənd.
