= Qızılqazma, Shabran =

Qızılqazma
- Location within Azerbaijan
- Coordinates: 40°57′50″N 48°50′00″E
- Country: Azerbaijan
- Rayon: Shabran
- Municipality: Çuxurazəmi
- Time zone: UTC+4 (AZT)
  - Summer (DST): UTC+5 (AZT)

Qızılqazma (also, Kyzylkazma) is a village in the Shabran Rayon of Azerbaijan. The village forms part of the municipality of Çuxurazəmi.
