= Zöhrabkənd =

- Location within Azerbaijan
- Coordinates: 40°58′31″N 48°51′21″E
- Country: Azerbaijan
- Rayon: Davachi
- Municipality: Çuxurazəmi
- Time zone: UTC+4 (AZT)
  - Summer (DST): UTC+5 (AZT)

Zöhrabkənd (also, Zakhrabkend and Zokhrabkend) is a village in the Davachi Rayon of Azerbaijan. The village forms part of the municipality of Çuxurazəmi.
