= Güneyməhlə =

Human settlement in Azerbaijan

Coordinates: 41°16′N 48°35′E

Güneyməhlə (also, Güneyməhəllə) is a village in the municipality of Püstəqasım in the Quba Rayon of Azerbaijan.
