= Lok, Pakistan =

Village in Pakistan

Coordinates: 31°47′N 70°43′E

Lok is a village in the western part of Dera Ismail Khan in Khyber-Pakhtunkhwa province of Pakistan. It is located at 31°46'59N 70°43'5E 169 metres (557 feet).
