= Neukölln 2 =

State electoral district of Germany

- Electoral district for the Berlin House of Representatives
- Neukölln 2 in 2026
- District: Neukölln
- Electorate: 32,127 (2026)

Current electoral district
- Party: The Left
- Member: Philipp-Martin Dehne

Neukölln 2 is an electoral constituency (German: Wahlkreis) represented in the House of Representatives of Berlin. It elects one member via first-past-the-post voting.

== Geography ==
The constituency comprises the area west of Karl-Marx-Straßeand north of the Berlin Ringbahn, and is entirely within the borough of Neukölln.

There were 32,127 eligible voters in 2026.

== Members ==
Election	Member	Party	%
1990	Annelies Herrmann	CDU	51.6
1995	Wolfgang Branoner	CDU	34.7
1999	Wolfgang Branoner	CDU	38.0
2001	Fritz Felgentreu	SPD	41.9
2006	Fritz Felgentreu	SPD	40.4
2011	Susanna Kahlefeld	Greens	29.7
2016	Susanna Kahlefeld	Greens	30.1
2021	Susanna Kahlefeld	Greens	32.9
2023	Susanna Kahlefeld	Greens	34.5
2026	Philipp-Martin Dehne	Left	50.0

== Election results ==
=== 2026 election ===
State election (2026): Neukölln 2
Notes:	Blue background denotes the winner of the electorate vote. Pink background denotes a candidate elected from their party list. Yellow background denotes an electorate win by a list member, or other incumbent. A ✓ or ✗ denotes status of any incumbent, win or lose respectively.						
Party	Candidate	Votes	%	±%	Party votes	%	±%
Left	Philipp-Martin Dehne	11,218	50.0	▲19.2	12,034	53.1	▲27.4
Greens	Bahar Haghanipour	5,263	23.4	▼11.0	4,439	19.6	▼16.2
SPD	Charlotte Mende	1,889	8.4	▼6.2	1,835	8.1	▼6.2
AfD	Matthias Marquardt	1,247	5.6	▲2.0	1,273	5.6	▲2.3
CDU	Büșra Karadaǧ	1,180	5.3	▼5.4	1,193	5.3	▼4.4
BSW	Michael Lüders	852	3.8		769	3.4	
Volt	Mathew Bristow	411	1.8		382	1.7	▲0.7
Tierschutzpartei					278	1.2	▼0.4
PARTEI	Otto Hempel	281	1.3	▼1.4	176	0.8	▼1.3
FDP					170	0.8	▼1.1
Independent	Thomas Lindlmair	113	0.5				
PdF					38	0.2	
DKP					31	0.1	▼0.1
ÖDP					22	0.1	Steady
du.					20	0.1	▼0.6
SGP					6	0.0	Steady
Informal votes		385			173		
Total valid votes		22,454			22,666		
Turnout		22,839	71.1	▲13.9			
Left gain from Greens	Majority	5,955	26.6				

=== 2023 repeat election ===
Changes denoted below for the 2023 election are compared to the 2016 election, as the 2021 election was declared invalid.

State election (2023): Neukölln 2
Notes:	Blue background denotes the winner of the electorate vote. Pink background denotes a candidate elected from their party list. Yellow background denotes an electorate win by a list member, or other incumbent. A ✓ or ✗ denotes status of any incumbent, win or lose respectively.						
Party	Candidate	Votes	%	±%	Party votes	%	±%
Greens	✓ Susanna Kahlefeld	6,123	34.5	▲9.3	6,378	35.8	▲10.6
Left	Jordine Schulz	5,458	30.7	▲11.5	4,575	25.7	▲4.0
SPD	Fabian Fischer	2,599	14.6	▼8.3	2,545	14.3	▼4.9
CDU	Nimet Avci	1,891	10.6	▲0.2	1,725	9.7	▼0.3
AfD	Julian Potthast	638	3.6	▼4.7	599	3.4	▼4.9
PARTEI	Thomas Tegtow	472	2.7	▼1.9	366	2.1	▼2.2
FDP					323	1.8	▼1.8
Tierschutzpartei	Maike Ohmenzetter	366	2.1		288	1.6	▼0.2
Team Todenhöfer					183	1.0	
Volt					171	1.0	
Klimaliste					132	0.7	
du.					121	0.7	
dieBasis	Thomas Ewald	93	0.5		76	0.4	
Pirates					51	0.3	▼2.6
Independent	Sylvia-Fee Wadehn	45	0.3				
Mieterpartei					43	0.2	
Bergpartei, die ÜberPartei					37	0.2	
DKP					36	0.2	▼0.3
Gray Panthers					33	0.2	▼0.5
Humanists					31	0.2	
The Grays					22	0.1	
FW	Mandana Share	39	0.2		10	0.1	
ÖDP	Thomas Löb	24	0.1		16	0.1	
Bildet Berlin!					14	0.1	
SGP					13	0.1	▼0.1
Verjüngungsforschung					12	0.1	▼0.3
NPD					8	0.0	▼0.5
LKR	Peter Ley	8	0.0		4	0.0	▼0.3
The Pinks/Alliance 21					5	0.0	
BüSo					3	0.0	Steady
Informal votes		179			114		
Total valid votes		17,756			17,820		
Turnout		17,947	57.2	▼7.9			
Greens hold	Majority	665	3.8				

=== 2021 election (annulled) ===
The election in 2021 was annulled and rerun in 2023.

State election (2021): Neukölln 2
Notes:	Blue background denotes the winner of the electorate vote. Pink background denotes a candidate elected from their party list. Yellow background denotes an electorate win by a list member, or other incumbent. A ✓ or ✗ denotes status of any incumbent, win or lose respectively.						
Party	Candidate	Votes	%	±%	Party votes	%	±%
Greens	✓ Susanna Kahlefeld	7,429	32.9	▲7.7	7,230	31.9	▲6.7
Left	Jordine Schulz	6,799	30.1	▲10.9	6,113	26.9	▲5.2
SPD	Fabian Fischer	3,993	17.7	▼5.2	3,835	16.9	▼2.3
CDU	Nimet Avci	1,238	5.5	▼5.0	1,153	5.1	▼4.9
PARTEI	Thomas Tegtow	729	3.2	▼1.4	628	2.8	▼1.5
AfD	Julian Potthast	722	3.2	▼5.1	694	3.1	▼5.2
Team Todenhöfer					602	2.7	
FDP	?	596	2.6	▼0.5	567	2.5	▼1.1
Klimaliste					318	1.4	
Tierschutzpartei	Maike Ohmenzetter	467	2.1		293	1.3	▼0.6
Volt					279	1.2	
dieBasis	Thomas Ewald	292	1.3		236	1.0	
du.					142	0.6	
FW	Mandana Share	140	0.6		91	0.4	
Independent	Sylvia-Fee Wadehn	87	0.4				
Bergpartei, die ÜberPartei					73	0.3	
Pirates					73	0.3	▼2.6
Gray Panthers					51	0.2	▼0.4
APT					50	0.2	
Humanists					47	0.2	
Mieterpartei					47	0.2	
DKP					39	0.2	▼0.3
The Grays					38	0.2	
ÖDP	Thomas Löb	45	0.2		29	0.1	
Bildet Berlin!					16	0.1	
NPD					15	0.1	▼0.5
Verjüngungsforschung					10	0.0	▼0.3
The Pinks/Alliance 21					5	0.0	
BüSo					3	0.0	Steady
LKR	Peter Ley	19	0.1		3	0.0	
SGP					3	0.0	▼0.2
Informal votes		305			193		
Total valid votes		22,556			22,683		
Turnout		22,905	71.9	▲6.8			
Greens hold	Majority	630	2.8				

== See also ==
- Politics of Berlin
- House of Representatives of Berlin
