= Gömürdəhnə =

- Municipality
- Location within Azerbaijan
- Coordinates: 41°02′39″N 48°43′15″E
- Country: Azerbaijan
- Rayon: Quba

Population
  - Total: 227
- Time zone: UTC+4 (AZT)
  - Summer (DST): UTC+5 (AZT)

Gömürdəhnə (also, Gümür Dəhnə, Dəhnə, Gömür-Dəhnə; Tat: Gümür Dəhnə) is a village and municipality in the Quba Rayon of Azerbaijan. It has a population of 227. The municipality consists of the villages of Gömürdəhnə and Puçuq.
