= Dehns =

UK firm of patent and trademark attorneys

- Company type: Partnership
- Industry: Law
- Founded: 1920
- Headquarters: London, Brighton, Oxford, Munich
- Products: Legal advice
- Number of employees: 200
- Website: www.dehns.com

Dehns (formerly "Frank B. Dehn & Co.") is a United Kingdom firm of patent and trade mark attorneys, with offices in London, Munich, Oslo, Oxford, Brighton, Manchester, Bristol and Birmingham. It was founded in 1920 by Frank Bernard Dehn.

== Description ==
Founded in 1920, the practice has offices in London, Munich, Oslo, Oxford, Brighton, Manchester, Bristol and Birmingham. The firm's patent work comes from European direct clients, particularly from Scandinavia, as well as the UK. The firm also acts directly for a large number of US Fortune 500 clients and handles a significant amount of work originating in Japan. Most of its trade mark work comes from the UK and from US direct client companies. Clients include small businesses and private inventors, as well as multinational firms.

The firm advises on all aspects of patenting innovative technology, registering words, logos and other marks and registering original designs. Services include preparation and filing of applications, opposition and cancellation actions, advice on areas of conflict, regular watching for patents and trade marks of competitors and conducting infringement and other proceedings. Industries in which it is active in patent work include pharmaceuticals, biochemistry, biotechnology, petrochemicals, polymer chemistry, textiles and materials science and metallurgy. It also operates in computing, electronics, telecommunications, automotive, engineering, aeronautics and civil engineering. Trade mark activities include broadcasting and communications, computing, publishing, leisure and entertainment, food and drinks, cosmetics, finance and travel. Experience in contentious matters ranges from European oppositions and appeals to worldwide infringement conflicts. In non-contentious matters such as mergers, acquisitions and re-financings, where intellectual property can form an important part of a firm's assets, the practice can carry out an intellectual property audit, advise on the strength of the intellectual property and record a party's interest.

== Achievements ==
As of 2016, it is ranked in the top tier of the annual Legal 500 list of UK patent firms, and in the second tier of the list of UK trademark firms .

In 2006 it was the second-largest firm in the UK by number of patent attorneys.

In 2005, Michael Butler, a partner at the firm, represented Neal Macrossan in his initial appeal hearing against a UK Patent Office decision not to allow Macrossan's patent application. The subsequent Court of Appeal judgment in Aerotel v Telco and Macrossan's Application, in which Mr Macrossan represented himself, informs the UK Intellectual Property Office's policy on patentable subject matter.
