= Muranovo =

Coordinates: 56.1786°N 37.9025°E

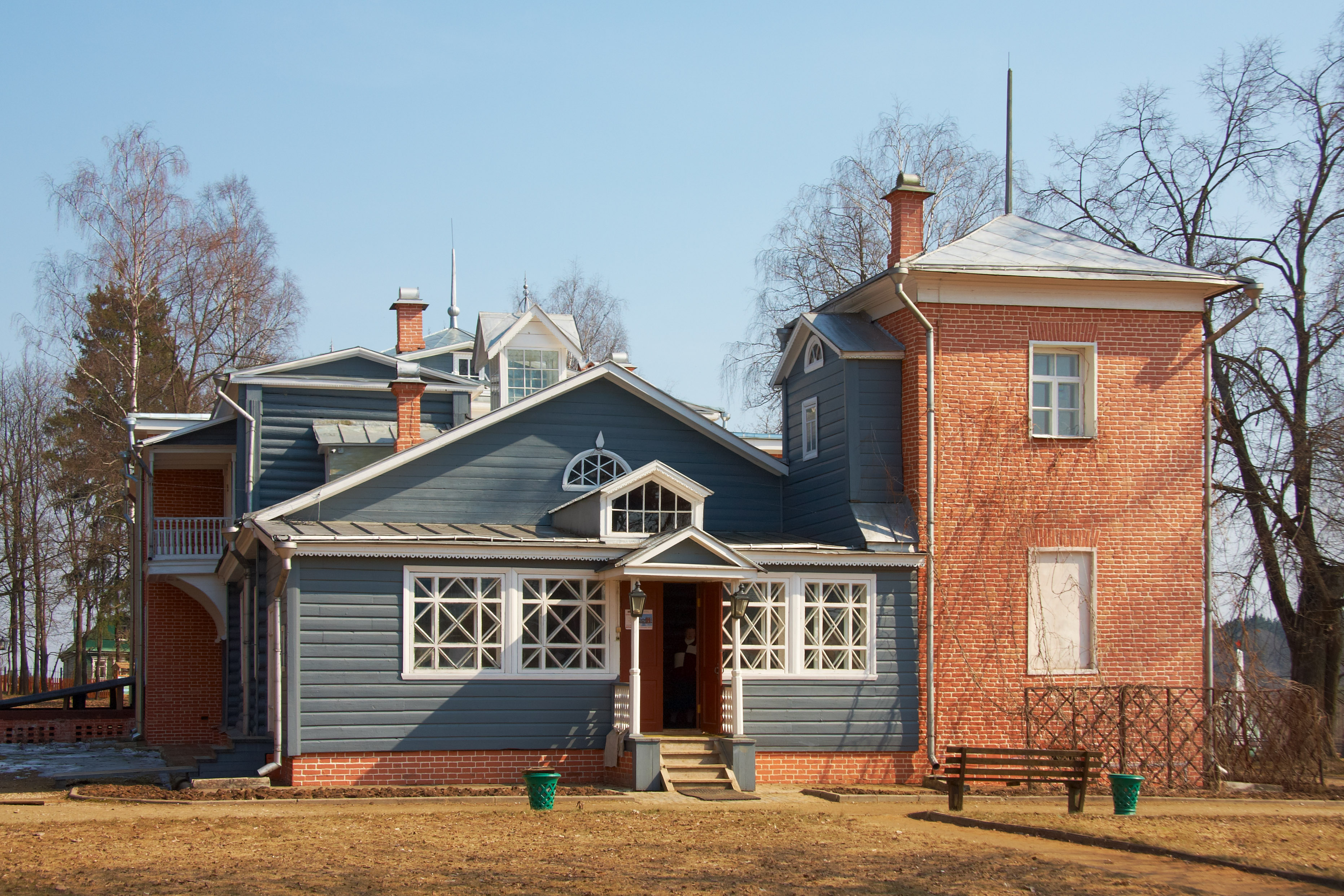
Memorial house in Muranovo

Muranovo is the Fyodor Tyutchev state museum located in Pushkino, Moscow Oblast, Russia.

The estate was founded in 1816 and since then has belonged to four families, including Fyodor Tyutchev's family. In August 1920, the estate became a museum. In July 2006, a fire from a lightning nearly destroyed the main building. Nevertheless, almost all exhibits were saved.
