= Dəhnə, Davachi =

Dəhnə is a village in the municipality of Çuxurəzəmi in the Davachi Rayon of Azerbaijan.
