= Dəhnə, Quba =

Dəhnə
- Location within Azerbaijan
- Coordinates: 41°16′45″N 48°36′02″E
- Country: Azerbaijan
- Rayon: Quba
- Municipality: Püstəqasım
- Time zone: UTC+4 (AZT)
  - Summer (DST): UTC+5 (AZT)

Dəhnə is a village in the Quba Rayon of Azerbaijan. The village forms part of the municipality of Püstəqasım.
