= Lili Dehn =

Russian author (1888–1963)

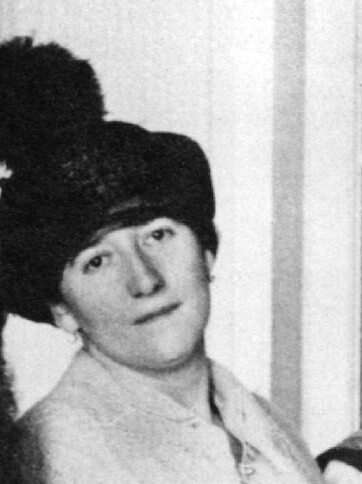
- Born: Yulia Alexandrovna Smolskaia; 9 August 1888; Revovka, Russia
- Died: 8 October 1963 (aged 75); Rome, Italy
- Spouse: Karl von Dehn (m. 1907; died 1932)
- Parents: Ismail Selim Bek Smolsky (father); Catherine Horvat (mother)

Yulia Alexandrovna von Dehn (Russian: Юлия Александровна фон Ден, romanized: Yuliya Aleksandrovna fon Den; 9 August [O.S. 28 July] 1888 – 8 October 1963), known as Lili Dehn, or Lili von Dehn, was a Russian aristocrat and memoirist. She was the wife of a Russian naval officer and a friend to Empress Alexandra Feodorovna.

Following the Russian Revolution of 1917, Dehn wrote a biography, The Real Tsaritsa, to refute rumors that were circulating in Europe during the 1920s about the Empress and Grigori Rasputin.

== Early life ==
Dehn was born Yulia Alexandrovna Smolskaia on her family's southern Russian estate, Revovka, a home of her ancestor General Mikhail Kutuzov, who defeated Napoleon during the 1812 invasion of Russia. Her parents were Ismail Selim Bek Smolsky and Catherine Horvat. Both sides of her family had a long history in Russia, according to her memoirs. Her parents divorced when she was eleven and her mother later remarried. Her maternal grandmother helped to raise her.

She was educated by tutors at home and wrote that she understood very little Russian as a child because her family spoke French. As a young girl, she enjoyed listening to folk stories of old Russia told by her maternal grandmother and her childhood nurse. "The peasants at Revovka were extremely superstitious, and they believed implicitly in witches and warlocks," wrote Dehn. Later, she had an English governess. She loved her childhood estate and, whenever she went to visit an uncle in Livadiya, took a bit of dirt with her from Revovka to remind her of home.

== Marriage and friendship with the Empress ==
Dehn married 1907 in Yalta, Carl Alexander Akimovich (or "Joachimovitch") von Dehn (1877–1932), a Russian naval officer whose family were Baltic Germans which came from Tallinn, Estonia, from Finland and from Sweden. Dehn was an officer on the imperial yacht, Standart, and was a favorite with the imperial children. The Empress took an interest in Dehn's new wife and befriended her following the marriage.

The Empress was the godmother for the Dehns' son, Alexander Leonide, who was born on 9 August 1908 and nicknamed "Titi". Dehn wrote that Titi was baptized Lutheran, which was required by her husband's family to maintain an inheritance. Alexandra remained disturbed that her godchild had had a Lutheran baptism and insisted seven years later that the child must be rebaptized in the Russian Orthodox Church. The Dehns complied with her request.

Dehn was skeptical about the holiness of the starets in making Grigori Rasputin and the Empress's reliance upon him, but wrote that Rasputin once prayed over her own son, Titi, when the child was dangerously ill and the boy made a quick recovery.

== World War I and Revolution ==
Dehn trained to become a Red Cross nurse during World War I and nursed wounded soldiers in a military hospital.

She was with the imperial family during the outbreak of the Russian Revolution of 1917 and helped nurse the imperial children and the Empress's friend, Anna Vyrubova, who was also Dehn's distant cousin, through an outbreak of measles. She witnessed the Emperor's abdication and the family's imprisonment by the new provisional government. Dehn left the palace with Anna Vyrubova to accompany her to the capital, following Vyrubova's arrest, and upon arriving in the capital, she was herself arrested.

She was not allowed to return to the Alexander Palace, and persuaded the government to place her under house arrest in her own home because her son Titi was dangerously ill.

Dehn wrote in her book that she blamed the Revolution on Jewish revolutionaries.

== Exile ==
Dehn escaped Russia aboard the ship SS Kherson with her mother and son Titi via Turkey and Greece. They eventually reached England. The family first settled in England, where the von Dehns had two more children, Ekaterina, or Katharina, or Catherine (Kitty), in December 1919, and Maria Olga, or Marie, in April 1923. They later moved to her father's estate, Hołowiesk near Bielsk Podlaski, in eastern Poland. Her husband died in 1932. After World War II broke out, she was forced to emigrate again and ended in Caracas, Venezuela, with her son Alexander (Titi) and her daughter Maria. In 1958, she moved with Maria and her husband Kurt Happe to the US and then to Rome where she died in 1963.

Her son, Alexander, died in 1974, in Caracas, Venezuela. Her daughter Katharina also died in Caracas, in 1987, and her daughter, Maria, died in February 2007, in La Crosse, Wisconsin, US. They all left children and grandchildren.
