= List of ambassadors of Japan to Austria =

The List of Japanese ambassadors to Austria started when Sano Tsunetami presented his credentials to the Austria-Hungarian government in 1873.

== List ==
This is a chronological list of Japanese diplomats.

Inaugural date	Official position (Japanese)	Official position	Name (Japanese)	Name
January 31, 1873	弁理務使	Chargé d'affaires	佐野 常民	Sano Tsunetami
September 30, 1873	弁理務使	Chargé d'affaires	河瀬 真孝	Kawase Masataka
November 22, 1873	特命全権公使	Minister Plenipotentiary	佐野 常民	Sano Tsunetami
August 23, 1875	特命全権公使	Minister Plenipotentiary	青木 周蔵	Aoki Shūzō
March 8, 1880	特命全権公使	Minister Plenipotentiary	井田 譲	Ida Yuzuru
September 2, 1882	特命全権公使	Minister Plenipotentiary	上野 景範	Ueno Kagenori
November 9, 1884	臨時代理公使	Chargé d'affaires ad interim	本間 清雄	Honma Kiyōo
July 3, 1885	特命全権公使	Minister Plenipotentiary	西園寺 公望	Saionji Kinmochi
October 8, 1887	特命全権公使	Minister Plenipotentiary	戸田 氏共	Toda Ujitaka
September 20, 1890	臨時代理公使	Chargé d'affaires ad interim	棚橋 軍次	Tanahashi Kunji
November 5, 1890	特命全権公使	Minister Plenipotentiary	渡辺 洪基	Watanabe Hiromoto
December 1, 1892	臨時代理公使	Chargé d'affaires ad interim	天野 瑚次郎	Amano Kojirō
December 30, 1892	臨時代理公使	Chargé d'affaires ad interim	大山 綱介	Ōyama Tsunasuke
September 18, 1895	臨時代理公使	Chargé d'affaires ad interim	杉村 虎一	Sugimura Kōichi
January 27, 1896	特命全権公使	Minister Plenipotentiary	高平 小五郎	Takahira Kogorō
May 3, 1899	臨時代理公使	Chargé d'affaires ad interim	吉田 作弥	Yoshida Sakuya
July 1, 1899	特命全権公使	Minister Plenipotentiary	牧野 伸顕	Makino Nobuaki
February 11, 1906	臨時代理公使	Chargé d'affaires ad interim	西 源四郎	Nishi Genshirō
February 26, 1907	臨時代理大使	Chargé d'affaires ad interim	西 源四郎	Nishi Genshirō
June 28, 1907	特命全権大使	Ambassador	内田 康哉	Uchida Kōsai
October 1, 1909	臨時代理大使	Chargé d'affaires ad interim	奥田 竹松	Okuda Takematsu
April 30, 1910	特命全権大使	Ambassador	秋月 左都夫	Akizuki Satsuo
June 9, 1913	臨時代理大使	Chargé d'affaires ad interim	奥田 竹松	Okuda Takematsu
July 27, 1914	特命全権大使	Ambassador	佐藤 愛麿	Satō Aimaro
August 27, 1914	First World War			
December 30, 1920	臨時代理公使	Chargé d'affaires ad interim	井田 守三	Ida Morizo
May 19, 1921	特命全権公使	Minister Plenipotentiary	本多 熊太郎	Honda Kumatarō
January 26, 1924	臨時代理公使	Chargé d'affaires ad interim	永井 清	Nagai Kiyoshi
April 27, 1924	特命全権公使	Minister Plenipotentiary	赤塚 正助	Akatsuka Shōsuke
June 30, 1926	臨時代理公使	Chargé d'affaires ad interim	荒川 充雄	Arakawa Mitsuo
February 28, 1927	特命全権公使	Minister Plenipotentiary	大野 守衛	Ōno Morie
September 20, 1930	臨時代理公使	Chargé d'affaires ad interim	永井 清	Nagai Kiyoshi
February 8, 1931	特命全権公使	Minister Plenipotentiary	有田 八郎	Arita Hachirō
January 15, 1932	臨時代理公使	Chargé d'affaires ad interim	市毛 孝三	Ichige Kozo
February 23, 1933	特命全権公使	Minister Plenipotentiary	松永 直吉	Matsunaga Naokichi
August 16, 1935	臨時代理公使	Chargé d'affaires ad interim	諏訪 務	Suwa Tsutomu
June 26, 1936	特命全権公使	Minister Plenipotentiary	谷 正之	Tani Masayuki
November 17, 1937	臨時代理公使	Chargé d'affaires ad interim	諏訪 務	Suwa Tsutomu
April 30, 1938	Closed following the Anschluss			
December 29, 1953	臨時代理公使	Chargé d'affaires ad interim	中川 進	Nakagawa Susumu
April 4, 1955	特命全権公使	Minister Plenipotentiary	大野 勝巳	Ōno Katsumi
November 26, 1956	臨時代理公使	Chargé d'affaires ad interim	根本 驥	Nemoto Ki
January 7, 1957	特命全権公使	Minister Plenipotentiary	古内 広雄	Furuichi Hiroo
December 16, 1957	特命全権大使	Ambassador	古内 広雄	Furuichi Hiroo
November 4, 1960	臨時代理大使	Chargé d'affaires ad interim	藤山 楢一	Fujiyama Naraichi
January 11, 1961	特命全権大使	Ambassador	内田 藤雄	Uchida Fujio
December 24, 1964	臨時代理大使	Chargé d'affaires ad interim	小木 曽本雄	Ogiso Motoo
April 2, 1965	特命全権大使	Ambassador	法眼 晋作	Hogen Shinsaku
April 9, 1968	臨時代理大使	Chargé d'affaires ad interim	穂崎 巧	Hozaki Takumi
June 28, 1968	特命全権大使	Ambassador	新関 欽哉	Niizeki Kinya
February 15, 1971	臨時代理大使	Chargé d'affaires ad interim	山戸 徹	Yamato Akira
May 13, 1971	特命全権大使	Ambassador	藤山 楢一	Fujiyama Naraichi
March 21, 1975	臨時代理大使	Chargé d'affaires ad interim	佐々木 正賢	Sasaki Seiken
August 12, 1975	特命全権大使	Ambassador	鹿取 泰衛	Katori Yasue
October 25, 1979	臨時代理大使	Chargé d'affaires ad interim	新井 弘一	Arai Hirokazu
January 14, 1980	特命全権大使	Ambassador	山戸 徹	Yamato Akira
March 22, 1983	臨時代理大使	Chargé d'affaires ad interim	木島 輝夫	Kijima Teruo
April 11, 1983	特命全権大使	Ambassador	宮沢 泰	Miyazawa Yasushi
May 22, 1985	臨時代理大使	Chargé d'affaires ad interim	松村 慶次郎	Matsumura Keijirō
June 5, 1985	特命全権大使	Ambassador	村田 良平	Murata Ryōhei
March 9, 1987	臨時代理大使	Chargé d'affaires ad interim	塚田 千裕	Tsukada Chihiro
March 16, 1987	特命全権大使	Ambassador	矢田部 厚彦	Yatabe Atsuhiko
July 23, 1990	臨時代理大使	Chargé d'affaires ad interim	稲川 照芳	Inagawa Teruyoshi
August 14, 1990	特命全権大使	Ambassador	長谷川 和年	Hasegawa Kazutoshi

== See also ==
- Austria–Japan relations
- Diplomatic rank
