= Nabokov (surname) =

Nabokov (masculine, Russian: Набоков) or Nabokova (feminine, Russian: Набокова) is a Russian surname. Notable people with the surname include:

- Vladimir Vladimirovich Nabokov (1899–1977), Russian–American author, entomologist, and chess problem composer
- Vladimir Dmitrievich Nabokov (1870–1922), Russian criminologist, journalist, and politician, and father of Vladimir Vladimirovich Nabokov
- Konstantin Dmitrievich Nabokov (1872–1927), Russian author and diplomat
- Nicolas Nabokov (1903–1978), Russian–American composer, cousin of Vladimir Vladimirovich Nabokov
- Dmitri Nabokov (1934–2012), singer and author, son of Vladimir Vladimirovich Nabokov
- Evgeni Nabokov (born 1975), Kazakh–Russian ice hockey player
