= Mamoru Shigemitsu =

Japanese diplomat and politician (1887–1957)

- 重光 葵
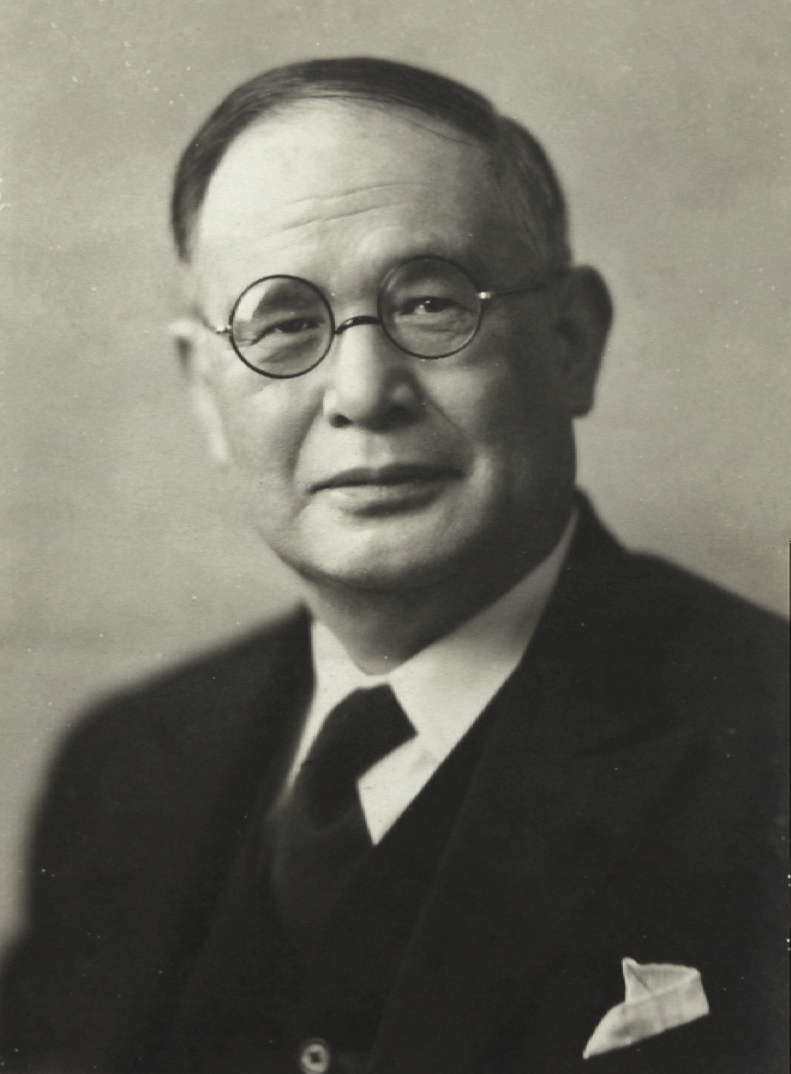
- Shigemitsu in 1945

Deputy Prime Minister of Japan
- In office December 10, 1954 – December 23, 1956
- Prime Minister: Ichirō Hatoyama
- Preceded by: Taketora Ogata
- Succeeded by: Mitsujirō Ishii

Minister of Foreign Affairs
- In office December 10, 1954 – December 23, 1956
- Prime Minister: Ichirō Hatoyama
- Preceded by: Katsuo Okazaki
- Succeeded by: Nobusuke Kishi
- In office August 17, 1945 – September 15, 1945
- Prime Minister: Naruhiko Higashikuni
- Preceded by: Shigenori Togo
- Succeeded by: Shigeru Yoshida
- In office April 20, 1943 – April 7, 1945
- Prime Minister: Hideki Tojo
- Preceded by: Masayuki Tani
- Succeeded by: Shigenori Togo

Minister of Greater East Asia
- In office August 17, 1945 – August 25, 1945
- Prime Minister: Naruhiko Higashikuni
- Preceded by: Shigenori Tōgō
- Succeeded by: Office abolished
- In office July 22, 1944 – April 7, 1945
- Prime Minister: Kuniaki Koiso
- Preceded by: Kazuo Aoki
- Succeeded by: Kantarō Suzuki

Member of the House of Representatives
- In office October 2, 1952 – January 26, 1957
- Preceded by: Takashi Nagata
- Succeeded by: Kentarō Ayabe
- Constituency: Ōita 2nd

Member of the House of Peers
- In office August 15, 1945 – August 29, 1945 Nominated by the Emperor

Personal details
- Born: July 29, 1887 Bungo-ōno, Ōita, Japan
- Died: January 26, 1957 (aged 69) Yugawara, Kanagawa, Japan
- Party: LDP (1955–1957)
- Other political affiliations: Independent (before 1952); Kaishintō (1952–1954); JDP (1954–1955)
- Education: Tokyo Imperial University

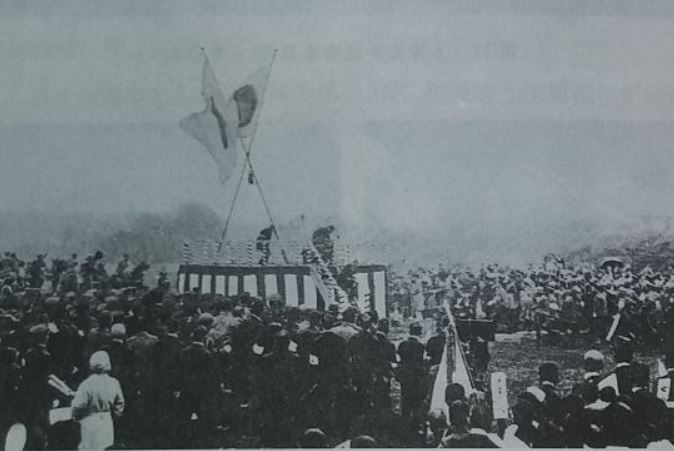
Hongkew Park, Shanghai, after the bombing in which Shigemitsu lost his leg on April 29, 1932

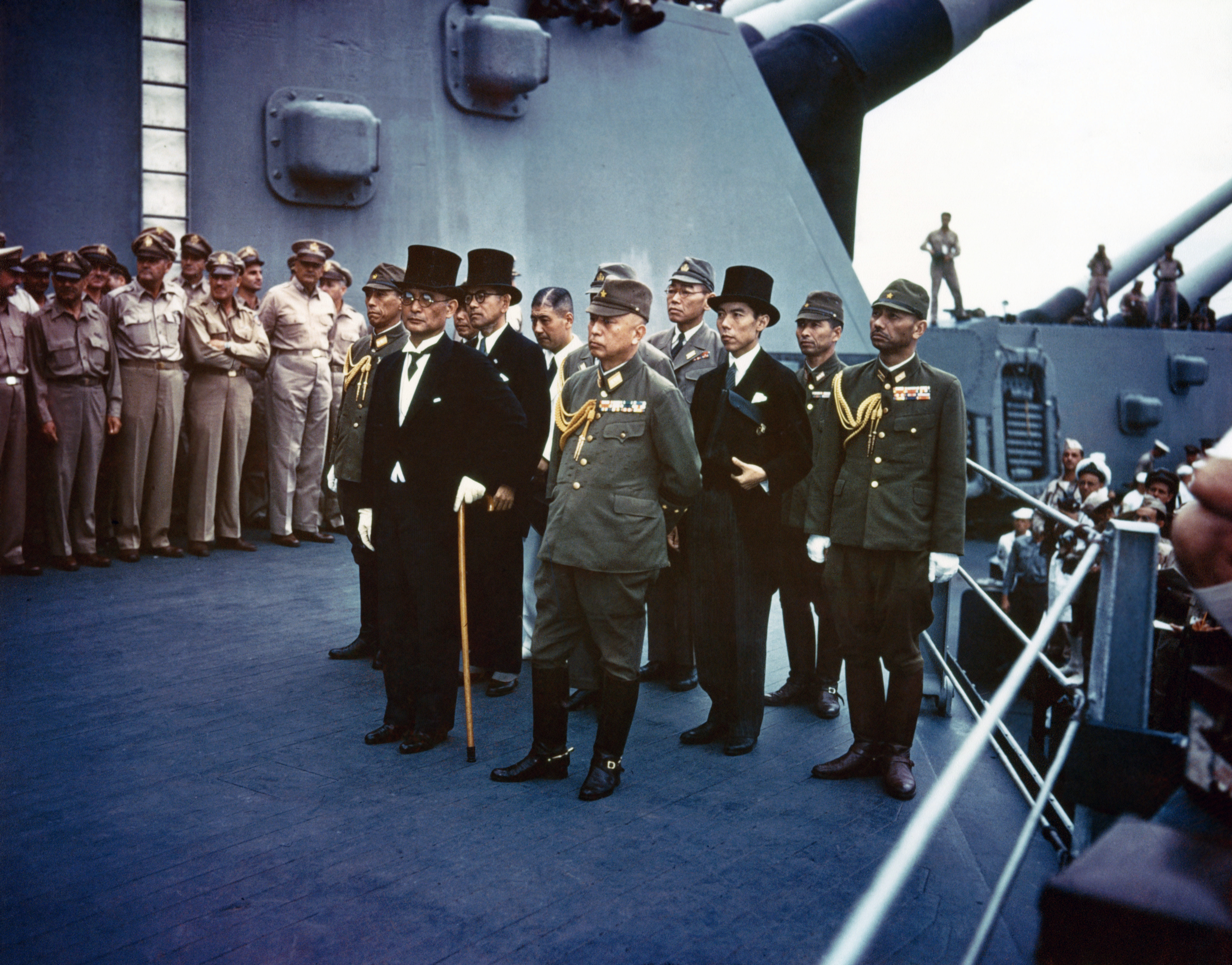
Shigemitsu (with cane) on board USS Missouri, September 2, 1945

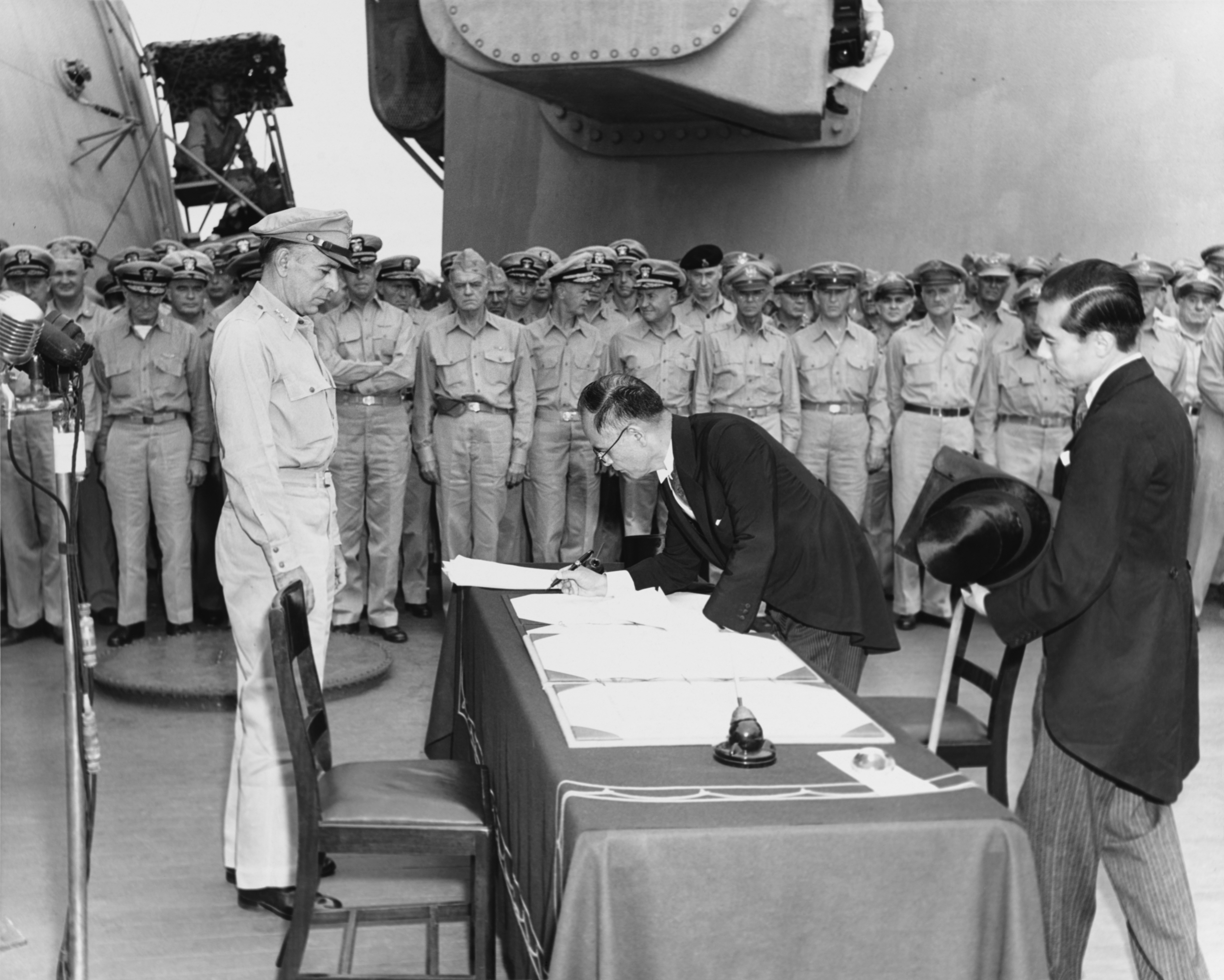
Shigemitsu signs the Japanese Instrument of Surrender at the end of World War II, accompanied by Toshikazu Kase (right).

Mamoru Shigemitsu (重光 葵, Shigemitsu Mamoru; July 29, 1887 – January 26, 1957) was a Japanese diplomat and politician who served as Minister of Foreign Affairs three times during and after World War II and as Deputy Prime Minister. As a civilian plenipotentiary representing the Japanese government, Shigemitsu cosigned the Japanese Instrument of Surrender on board the battleship USS Missouri on September 2, 1945.

== Early life and career ==
Shigemitsu was born in what is now part of the city of Bungo-ōno, Ōita Prefecture, Japan. He graduated from the Law School of Tokyo Imperial University in 1911 and immediately entered the Ministry of Foreign Affairs. After World War I, he served in numerous overseas diplomatic assignments, including in Germany and the United Kingdom and briefly as consul at the Japanese consulate in Seattle, Washington, United States.

== Pre-war ==
Following the Mukden Incident in 1931, Shigemitsu was active in various western capitals, attempting to reduce alarm at Japanese military activities in Manchuria.

During the First Shanghai Incident of 1932, he was successful in enlisting the aid of western nations in brokering a ceasefire between the Kuomintang Army and the Imperial Japanese Army. On April 29, 1932, while attending a celebration for the birthday of Emperor Hirohito in Shanghai, a Korean independence activist, Yoon Bong-Gil, threw a bomb at a reviewing stand killing General Yoshinori Shirakawa and wounding several others, including Shigemitsu. Shigemitsu lost his right leg in the attack and walked with an artificial leg and cane for the rest of his life.

Shigemitsu later became ambassador to the Soviet Union, and in 1938, he negotiated a settlement of the Russo-Japanese border clash at Changkufeng Hill. He then became Japan's ambassador to the United Kingdom during a period of deteriorating Anglo-Japanese relations, most notably the Tientsin incident of 1939, which pushed Japan to the brink of war with the United Kingdom. He was recalled in June 1941.

== World War II ==
Shigemitsu was highly critical of the foreign policies of Yōsuke Matsuoka, especially the Tripartite Pact, which he warned would further strengthen anti-Japanese sentiment in the United States. Shigemitsu spent two weeks in Washington, DC, on the way back from Britain and conferred with Ambassador Kichisaburō Nomura to attempt to arrange for direct face-to-face negotiations between Japanese Prime Minister Fumimaro Konoe and US President Franklin D. Roosevelt.

Shigemitsu's many attempts to stave off World War II angered the militarists in Tokyo, and only two days after the attack on Pearl Harbor, he was sidelined with an appointment as ambassador to the Japanese-sponsored Reorganized National Government of China. In China, Shigemitsu argued that the success of the proposed Greater East Asia Co-Prosperity Sphere depended on the equal treatment of China and the other Asian nations by Japan.

On April 20, 1943, in a move that was viewed as a sign that Japan might be preparing for a collapse of the Axis powers, Japanese Prime Minister Hideki Tōjō replaced Foreign Minister Masayuki Tani with Shigemitsu, who had been steadfast in his opposition to the militarists. Shigemitsu was thus foreign minister during the Greater East Asia Conference. The American press often referred to him in headlines as "Shiggy".

From July 22, 1944, to April 7, 1945, he served simultaneously as Minister of Foreign Affairs and Minister of Greater East Asia in the Kuniaki Koiso administration. He then again served as Minister of Foreign Affairs briefly in August 1945 in the Prince Higashikuni Naruhiko administration right before Japan's surrender.

Shigemitsu, as civilian plenipotentiary, along with General Yoshijirō Umezu, signed the Japanese Instrument of Surrender on board the battleship USS Missouri on September 2, 1945.

== Post-war ==
Despite Shigemitsu's well-known opposition to the war, at the insistence of the Soviet Union, he was taken into custody by the Supreme Commander of the Allied Powers and held in Sugamo Prison as an accused war criminal. Despite a signed deposition by Joseph Grew, the former ambassador of the United States to Japan, over the protests of Joseph B. Keenan, the chief prosecutor, Shigemitsu and his case came to trial and was convicted by the International Military Tribunal for the Far East for waging an aggressive war and for not doing enough to protect prisoners-of-war from inhumane treatment. However, the tribunal was extremely lenient on the grounds that Shigemitsu had regularly opposed Japanese militarism and protested the POWs' inhumane treatment.

He was sentenced to seven years in prison, the lightest punishment that was handed down to anyone convicted at the trial. He was paroled in 1950.

After the end of the occupation of Japan, Shigemitsu formed a short-lived political party, Kaishintō, which merged with the Japan Democratic Party in 1954. In October 1952, he was elected to a seat in the Lower House of the Diet of Japan, and in 1954, he became Deputy Prime Minister of Japan under Prime Minister Ichirō Hatoyama, the leader of Japan Democratic Party.

The cabinet continued after the merger of the party and the Liberal Party as the Liberal Democratic Party (LDP) in 1955, and Shigemitsu continued to hold the post of Deputy Prime Minister of Japan until 1956.

Shigemitsu concurrently served as Foreign Minister from 1954 to 1956. In April 1955, he represented Japan at the Bandung Conference held in Indonesia, which marked the beginning of the return of Japan to participating in an international conference since the League of Nations. Then in August, Shigemitsu led a high-level Japanese delegation to the United States to press for a revision to the U.S.–Japan Security Treaty, but this effort was met with a cold reception from Secretary of State John Foster Dulles, who had been the treaty's primary architect and was loath to revisit it. Dulles told Shigemitsu in no uncertain terms that any discussion of treaty revision was "premature" because Japan lacked "the unity, cohesion, and capacity to operate under a new treaty arrangement," and Shigemitsu was forced to return to Japan empty-handed.

The following year, Shigemitsu addressed the United Nations General Assembly, pledging Japan's support of the founding principles of the United Nations and formally applying for membership. Japan became the UN's 80th member on December 18, 1956. Shigemitsu also travelled to Moscow in 1956 in an attempt to normalize diplomatic relations and to resolve the Kuril Islands dispute. The visit resulted in the Soviet–Japanese Joint Declaration of 1956.

== Death ==
In January 1957, a year after his visit to the Soviet Union, Shigemitsu died of myocardial infarction at 69 in his summer home in Yugawara, Kanagawa.

== Sources ==
- Shigemitsu, Mamoru (1958). Japan and Her Destiny: My Struggle for Peace. F.S.G. Piggott (editing), Oswald White (translation). New York: Dutton. OCLC 1069057234.
- Archive Footage references to Shigemitsu at Internet Movie Database
- Website on exhibition in Japanese Parliament Nov 8–30, 2007 , accessed November 14, 2007

Diplomatic posts
Preceded by Sadao Saburi	Minister to China; 1931–1932	Succeeded by Akira Ariyoshi
Preceded by Hachirō Arita	Vice Minister for Foreign Affairs; 1933–1936	Succeeded by Kensuke Horinouchi
Preceded by Tamekichi Ōta	Ambassador to the Soviet Union; 1936–1938	Succeeded by Shigenori Tōgō
Preceded by Shigeru Yoshida	Ambassador to Britain; 1939–1941	Diplomatic relations severed
Preceded by Kumataro Honda	Ambassador to China (Wang Jingwei regime); 1942–1943	Succeeded by Masayuki Tani
Political offices
Preceded by Masayuki Tani	Minister for Foreign Affairs; April 1943 – April 1945	Succeeded by Kantarō Suzuki
Preceded by Kazuo Aoki	Minister of Greater East Asia; July 1944 – April 1945	Succeeded by Kantarō Suzuki
Preceded by Shigenori Tōgō	Minister of Greater East Asia; August 1945 – August 1945	Succeeded by Office abolished
Preceded by Shigenori Tōgō	Minister for Foreign Affairs; August 1945 – September 1945	Succeeded by Shigeru Yoshida
Preceded by Katsuo Okazaki	Minister for Foreign Affairs; December 1954 – December 1956	Succeeded by Nobusuke Kishi
Preceded by Taketora Ogata	Deputy Prime Minister of Japan; 1954–1956	Succeeded by Mitsujirō Ishii
