= Roman Rosen =

Russian diplomat (1847–1921)

- Роман Розен
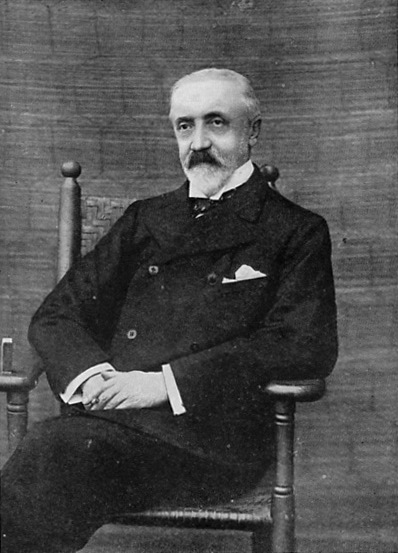
- Rosen in 1920
- Born: February 24, 1847; Reval, Governorate of Estonia, Russian Empire
- Died: December 31, 1921 (aged 74); New York City, New York, U.S.
- Other name: Baron Rosen
- Occupation: Diplomat

Baron Roman Romanovich Rosen (Russian: Роман Романович Розен, romanized: Roman Romanovich Rozen; February 24, 1847 – December 31, 1921) was a diplomat in the service of the Russian Empire.

== Biography ==
Rosen was from a Baltic German nobility (with a Swedish title, obtained when Livonia and Pomerania were Swedish territories) that included musicians and military leaders. One of his ancestors, another Baron Rosen, won distinction in command of the Astrakhanskii Cuirassier Regiment at the Battle of Borodino on September 7, 1812, for which he was noted in the official battlefield report to General Barclay de Tolly. A Washington Post article dated July 5, 1905 claimed that "Baron Rosen is of Swedish ancestry, his forebears having followed Swedish King Gustavus Adolphus in his invasion of Russia and settled there. He was chargé d'affaires at Tokyo and later at Washington, and was acting in a judicial capacity as the mouthpiece of an international tribunal that was regarded as discourteous to Japan. ... As judicial minister, he reformed the judicial system of Siberia." Actually, the family was originally from Bohemia (Habsburg territory) and included one Marshal of France and one Austrian Field-Marshal. Rosen’s mother was a Georgian, Elizabeth Sulkhanishvili.

=== Early career ===
Rosen graduated from the Imperial University of Dorpat and the Imperial School of Jurisprudence, and joined the Russian Foreign Ministry’s Asiatic Department, rising to head the Japan Bureau in 1875. He helped draft the Treaty of Saint Petersburg (1875), in which Japan exchanged its claims over Sakhalin for undisputed sovereignty over the entire Kurile islands chain. He served as First Secretary of the Russian legation at Yokohama from 1875 to 1883. Rosen was then appointed to the Consulate-General of Russia in New York City in 1884, and then as temporary charge d’affaires to Washington, D.C., from 1886 to 1889. In 1891, he opened the Russian legation in Mexico City, remaining as diplomatic representative to Mexico until 1893. He then returned to Europe, and was appointed ambassador to Serbia, staying in Belgrade until 1897.

=== Career in the Far East ===
During a short term as Russian minister to Tokyo in 1897–1898, Rosen concluded the Nishi-Rosen Agreement between Russia and Japan, whose articles recognized Japanese supremacy in Korea in exchange for an implicit recognition of Russia's exclusive rights to the Kwantung Leased Territory. However, after he was publicly critical over increasing Russian military activity on the Korean coast and the Yalu River, he was suddenly transferred to the rather symbolic post as Ambassador of Russia to the Kingdom of Bavaria in 1899. In 1900 his diplomatic career revived when he exchanged Munich for Greece, and in April 1903 his most important period commenced when he was reinstalled as Minister in Tokyo. Rosen was in Tokyo at the start of the Russo-Japanese War, which he had made every effort to prevent. When United States President Theodore Roosevelt attempted to mediate the hostilities, Rosen was chosen as new Russian ambassador to the United States in May 1905 and as Sergei Witte's deputy within the Russian peace delegation. Rosen traveled to New Hampshire for negotiations in a cessation of hostilities and a peace treaty. The resulting Treaty of Portsmouth was a diplomatic triumph, which ended the war on very favorable terms for Russia.

Negotiating the Treaty of Portsmouth (1905) – from left to right: the Russians at far side of table are Korostovetz, Nabokov, Witte, Rosen, Plancon; and the Japanese at near side of table are Adachi, Ochiai, Komura, Takahira, Satō. The large conference table is today preserved at the Museum Meiji Mura in Inuyama, Aichi Prefecture, Japan.

=== Later career ===
Rosen stayed in the United States until autumn 1911, when he was recalled to St. Petersburg to retire from the diplomatic service. He was subsequently appointed by Tsar Nicholas II to the State Council of Imperial Russia. He held this membership in the Russian parliamentary Upper House under the Constitution of 1905 until the overthrow of the monarchy by the February Revolution in 1917. During this time, in 1913, he spoke against the alienation of Congress Poland, arguing that if a "racial conflict" were to break out in Europe, "Russia's frontiers should be in unity with herself." After the Bolshevik takeover in November 1917 October Revolution and the subsequent persecution of the old political and social elites, Rosen and his family managed to escape from Russia with the help of Western diplomatic friends in the end of the year 1918. He spent his last years in poverty, working as a translator and business consultant.

He got hit by a taxi cab driver while walking down the street on the night of December 14, 1921, in Manhattan, New York City. This crash resulted in the fracture of his shin bone, and despite the fact that he was initially "cheerful[ly] unconcern[ed]" about this crash, Baron Rosen died due to lobar pneumonia resulting from this crash on December 31, 1921, a little more than two weeks after this crash occurred.

== Legacy ==
Rosen wrote a series of articles about European diplomacy and politics for The Saturday Evening Post covering the period from his first exile in Sweden to his life in the United States. The series was published in 41 parts from 1919–1921 and was posthumously issued as a 2-volume-book "Forty Years of a Diplomat's Life" in 1922.

== Awards ==
- Order of St. Stanislaus, 1st degree, (1894)
- Order of St. Anne, 1st degree (1898)
- Order of St Vladimir, 2nd degree (1900)
- Order of the White Eagle, (1897)
- , Order of St. Alexander Nevsky, (1911)
