= Hiroshi Saito (diplomat) =

Japanese diplomat

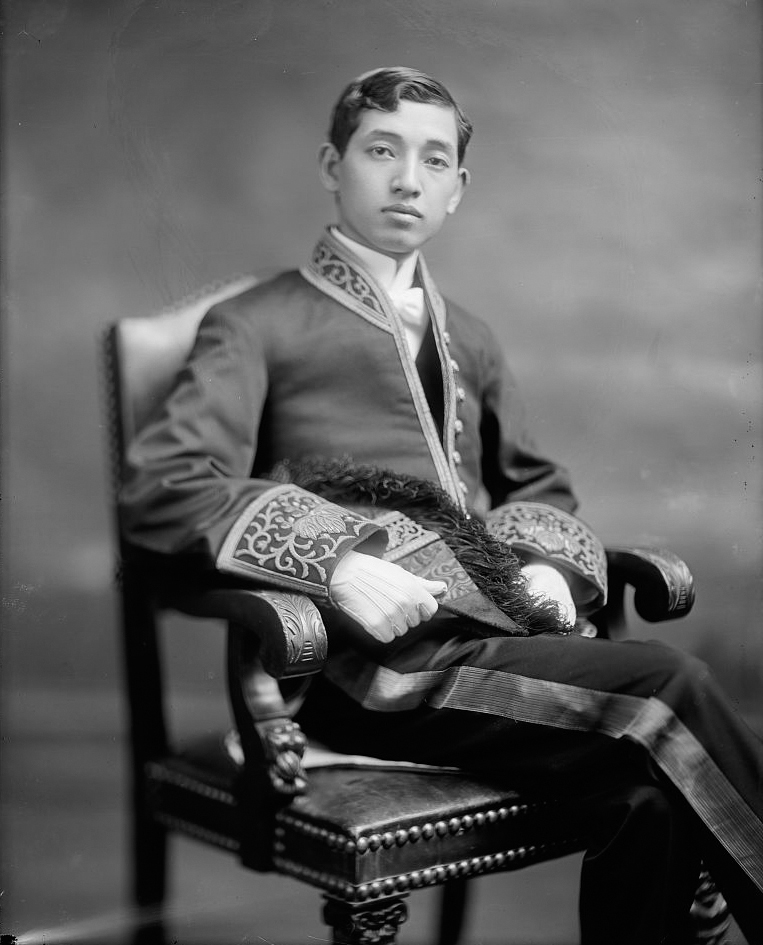
Formal photograph of Hiroshi Saito in his early career in the Japanese Diplomatic corp.

Hiroshi Saito (斎藤 博, Saitō Hiroshi; December 24, 1886 – February 26, 1939) was the Japanese ambassador to the United States from 1934 till his resignation in October 1938. He died months later in February 1939.

As an envoy, Saito took part in Japan's 1934 renunciation of the Washington Naval Treaty. Saito worked to maintain good relations with the U.S., even as further global condemnation for the Japanese invasion of Manchuria was mounting. Among the notable issues that he faced was the USS Panay incident.

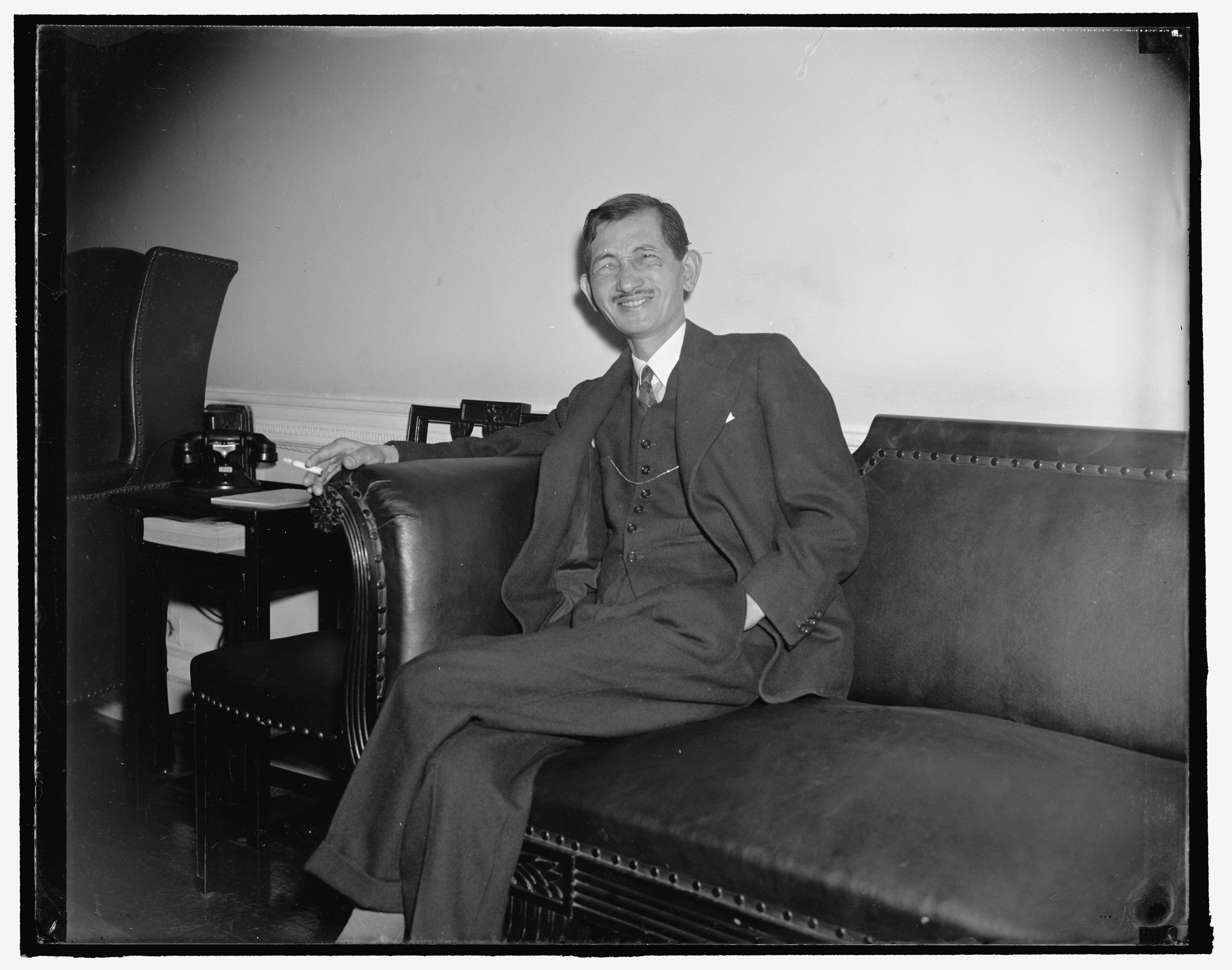
Saito, laughing while waiting to record a response to the USS Panay incident.

Almost no one in the United States remained sympathetic to Japan following these two situations and Saito's career was then considered a failure. He resigned as Ambassador in October, 1938 and died in Washington, D.C. in February, 1939 at age 52 from tuberculosis. Upon his death, still with Ambassador rank, his body was returned to Japan via the heavy cruiser USS Astoria under the command of Captain Richmond K. Turner.

== Personal life and Early career ==
Sakiko Saitō being crowned Queen of the Cherry Blossoms.

Hiroshi Saitō was the son (as described by historian Walter A. McDougall) of a humble school teacher in a provincial Japanese town in 1886. His father taught English, which Saito learned. Saito, because of his proficiency in English, became a translator in the Ministry of Foreign Affairs (Japan), and met Foreign Minister Komura Jutaro, who promoted his career. (Komura was once attached to the Translation Bureau of the Ministry of Foreign Affairs.) He attended Peers College and Tokyo University and then officially joined the foreign service, serving as a junior attaché in Washington and London. He was also an observer of the Paris Peace Conference (1919-1920).

Saito also served as the Japanese Consul General in New York from 1923 to 1929.

At age 32 he returned to Japan from the U.S. to marry Miyoko Nagayo, daughter of Baron Sensai Nagayo, a diplomat in the Iwakura Mission. They had two daughters, Sakiko Saitō born in 1927 and Makako Saitō, born in 1930.
