= Shigenori Tōgō =

Japanese politician, war criminal (1882–1950)

Shigenori Togo
- 東郷 茂徳
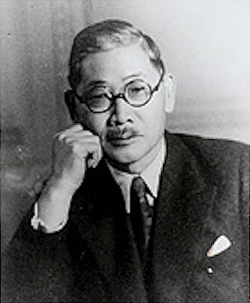

Minister for Foreign Affairs
- In office 9 April 1945 – 17 August 1945
- Prime Minister: Kantarō Suzuki
- Preceded by: Mamoru Shigemitsu
- Succeeded by: Mamoru Shigemitsu
- In office 18 October 1941 – 1 September 1942
- Prime Minister: Hideki Tojo
- Preceded by: Teijirō Toyoda
- Succeeded by: Masayuki Tani

Minister of Greater East Asia
- In office 9 April 1945 – 17 August 1945
- Prime Minister: Kantarō Suzuki
- Preceded by: Kantarō Suzuki
- Succeeded by: Mamoru Shigemitsu

Minister of Colonial Affairs
- In office 18 October 1941 – 2 December 1941
- Prime Minister: Hideki Tojo
- Preceded by: Teijirō Toyoda
- Succeeded by: Hiroya Ino

Member of the House of Peers
- In office 1 September 1942 – 13 April 1946 Nominated by the Emperor

Personal details
- Born: Shigenori Boku (朴 茂徳, Boku Shigenori); 10 December 1882 Hioki, Kagoshima, Empire of Japan
- Died: 23 July 1950 (aged 67) Sugamo Prison, Tokyo, Allied-occupied Japan
- Education: Tokyo Imperial University
- Occupation: Diplomat, Politician, Cabinet Minister

Shigenori Tōgō (東郷 茂徳, Tōgō Shigenori; 10 December 1882 – 23 July 1950) was Minister of Foreign Affairs for the Empire of Japan at both the start and the end of the Pacific War. He also served as Minister of Colonial Affairs in 1941, and assumed the same position, renamed the Minister for Greater East Asia, in 1945.

== Early life and education ==
Tōgō was born in Hioki District, Kagoshima, in what is now part of the city of Hioki, Kagoshima. His family were descended from Koreans who had settled in Kyushu after Toyotomi Hideyoshi's campaign against Korea (1592–98). His father took up the last name of "Tōgō" in 1886, replacing the original Korean surname "Boku", or "Park".

Tōgō was a 1904 graduate of the literature department of Tokyo Imperial University, and subsequently studied the German language at Meiji University. He entered the Ministry for Foreign Affairs in 1912, having applied unsuccessfully on four previous occasions.

== Diplomatic career ==
Tōgō’s first overseas posting was to the Japanese consulate at Mukden, Manchuria, in 1913. In 1916, he was assigned to the Japanese embassy in Bern, Switzerland. In 1919, Tōgō was sent on a diplomatic mission to Weimar Germany, as diplomatic relations between the two countries were reestablished following the Japanese ratification of the Treaty of Versailles. He returned to Japan in 1921 and was assigned to the Bureau of North American affairs. In 1926, Tōgō was appointed as secretary to the Japanese embassy in United States, and moved to Washington DC. He returned to Japan in 1929, and after a brief stay in Manchuria, was sent back to Germany. He was the head of the Japanese delegation to the largely unsuccessful World Disarmament Conference held in Geneva in 1932. Tōgō returned to Japan in 1933 to assume the post of director of the Bureau of North American affairs, but was in a severe automobile accident which left him hospitalized for over a month.

In 1937, Tōgō was appointed as Japanese ambassador to Germany, serving in Berlin for a year. After Tōgō was replaced as ambassador to Germany by Hiroshi Ōshima, he was reassigned to Moscow as the ambassador to the Soviet Union 1938–1940. During this time, he negotiated a peace settlement following the Battles of Khalkhin Gol between Japan and the Soviet Union, and successfully concluded the Soviet–Japanese Neutrality Pact in April 1941. He was then recalled to Japan by then Foreign Minister Yōsuke Matsuoka for reassignment.

== Pacific War ==
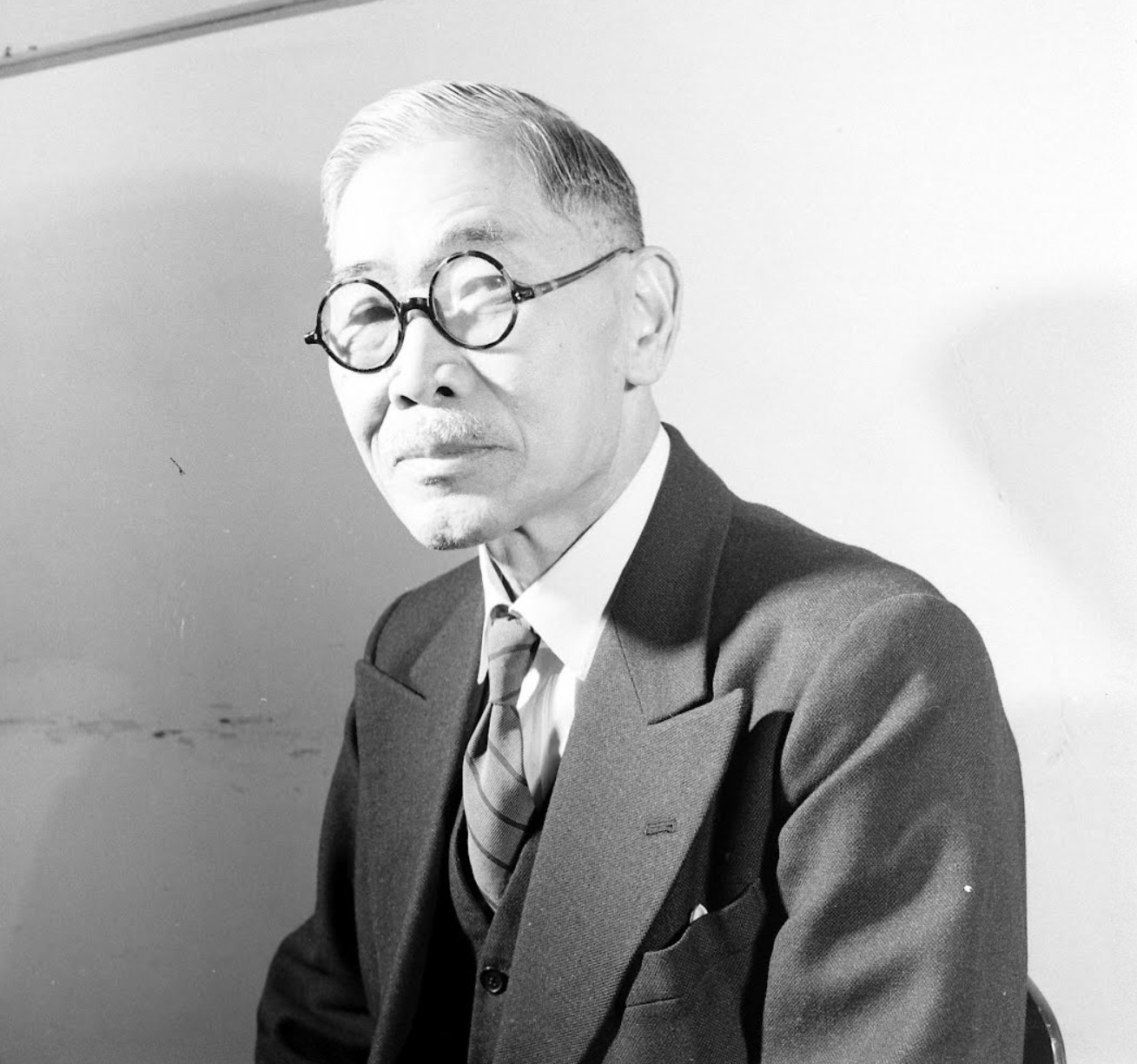
Tōgō at the Ichigaya courthouse, during the International Military Tribunal for the Far East

Tōgō adamantly opposed war with the United States and the other western powers, which he felt was generally unwinnable. Together with Mamoru Shigemitsu he made unsuccessful last-ditch efforts to arrange for direct face-to-face negotiations between Prime Minister Fumimaro Konoe and US President Franklin Roosevelt in an attempt to stave off armed conflict. In October 1941 Tōgō became Foreign Minister in the Tōjō administration. Once the Empire had decided on attacking, Tōgō signed the declaration of war, as he disliked pressing the responsibility of the failure of diplomacy on others. Following the 7 December 1941 attack on Pearl Harbor that signalled the start of the Pacific War, he worked quickly to conclude an alliance between the Japanese Empire and Thailand on 23 December 1941 (based on the Treaty between Thailand and Japan (1940)).

As part of a more reconciliatory policy towards the western powers, Tōgō announced on 21 January 1942 that the Japanese government would uphold the Geneva Convention, even though it did not sign it. On 1 September 1942, he resigned his post as Foreign Minister due to his opposition to establish a special ministry for occupied territories within the Japanese government (the new ministry, the Ministry of Greater East Asia eventually emerged in November of that same year). Although appointed to the Upper House of the Diet of Japan, throughout most of the war he lived in retirement.

Upon the formation of the government of Admiral Kantarō Suzuki in April 1945, Tōgō was asked to return to his former position as Minister of Foreign Affairs. In that position, he was one of the chief proponents for acceptance of the Potsdam Declaration which, he felt, contained the best conditions for peace Japan could hope to receive. Up until the last, Tōgō hoped for favorable terms from the Soviet Union. At Tōgō's suggestion, Japan made no official response to the Declaration at first, though a censored version was released to the Japanese public, while Tōgō waited to hear from Moscow. However, Allied leaders interpreted this silence as a rejection of the Declaration, and allowed bombing to continue.

Tōgō was one of the Cabinet Ministers who advocated Japanese surrender in the summer of 1945. He instructed Ambassador Naotake Satō to tell the USSR that Japan was willing to surrender but not unconditionally. Several days after the atomic bombings of Hiroshima and Nagasaki, and following Japanese defeats in the August Storm operation, the Japanese government agreed to unconditional surrender.

Following the end of World War II, Tōgō retired to his summer home in Karuizawa, Nagano. However, the Supreme Commander of the Allied Powers soon ordered his arrest on war-crime charges, along with all former members of the Imperial Japanese government; he was held at Sugamo Prison. During the International Military Tribunal for the Far East, Haruhiko Nishi agreed to act as his defense attorney. On 4 November 1948 the Tribunal sentenced Tōgō to 20 years' imprisonment.

== Personal life ==
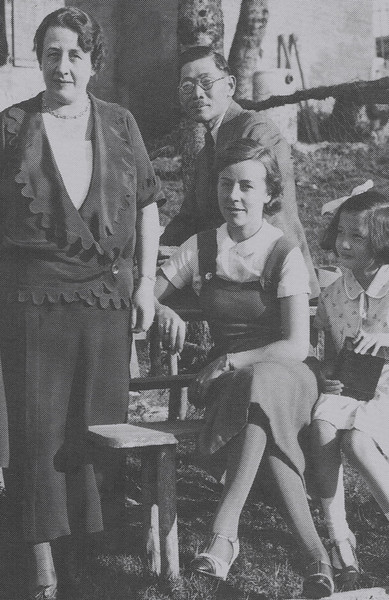
Shigenori Tōgō with his wife Edith and her eldest daughter from her first marriage, Ursula de Lalande, and only daughter from the second marriage with Shigenori Tōgō, Ise Tōgō, in Geneva, 1932

In 1922, despite the strenuous objections of Tōgō's family, he married Carla Victoria Editha Albertina Anna de Lalande (nee Giesecke 1887-1967), the widow of noted German architect George de Lalande (1872-1914) who designed numerous administrative buildings in Japan and its empire, including the Japanese General Government Building in Seoul. Their wedding was held at the Imperial Hotel in Tokyo. His wife had four daughters and one son from her first marriage, Ursula de Lalande, Ottilie de Lalande, Yuki de Lalande, Heidi de Lalande and Guido de Lalande; together they had one daughter named Ise.

In 1943 Ise married Fumihiko Honjo, a Japanese diplomat, who, out of respect for his wife's family, adopted her surname Tōgō. Fumihiko Tōgō (1915-1985) later served as the Japanese Ambassador to the United States from 1976 to 1980. The couple's son Kazuhiko Tōgō (born 1945) is a Japanese diplomat and scholar on international relations.

== Death ==
Tōgō, who suffered from atherosclerosis, died of cholecystitis in Sugamo Prison on 23 July 1950. A volume of his memoirs entitled The Cause of Japan was published posthumously; it was edited by his former defense counsel Ben Bruce Blakeney.

== See also ==
- List of Japanese ministers, envoys and ambassadors to Germany

Political offices
Preceded by Teijirō Toyoda	Minister for Colonial Affairs; 1941	Succeeded by Hiroya Ino
Preceded by Teijirō Toyoda	Minister for Foreign Affairs of Japan; 1941–1942	Succeeded by Hideki Tōjō
Preceded by Kantarō Suzuki	Minister for Foreign Affairs of Japan; 1945	Succeeded by Mamoru Shigemitsu
Preceded by Kantarō Suzuki	Minister for Greater East Asia; 1945	Succeeded by Mamoru Shigemitsu
Diplomatic posts
Preceded by Mushanokōji Kintomo	Japanese Ambassador to Nazi Germany; 1937–1938	Succeeded by Hiroshi Ōshima
Preceded by Mamoru Shigemitsu	Japanese Ambassador to the Soviet Union; 1938–1940	Succeeded by Yoshitsugu Tatekawa
