= Takahira Kogorō =

Japanese diplomat

Junior Second Rank Baron Takahira Kogorō KCMG
- 高平 小五郎
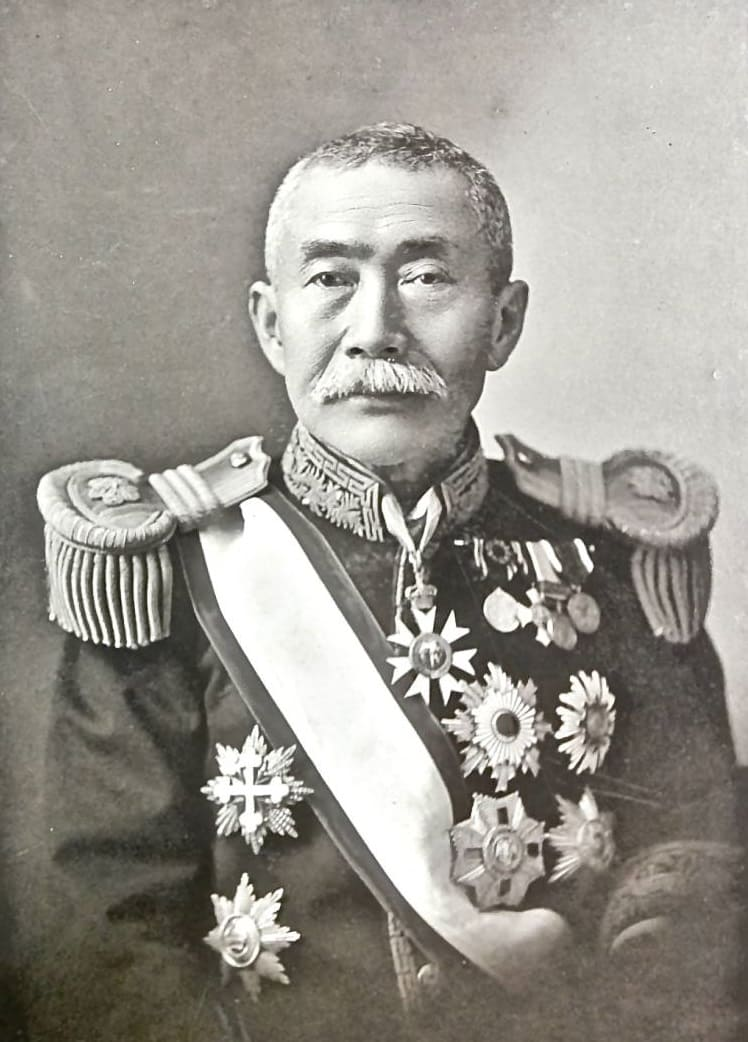

Member of the House of Peers
- In office 26 December 1917 – 28 November 1926 Nominated by the Emperor
- In office 25 January 1906 – 4 April 1907 Nominated by the Emperor

Personal details
- Born: 29 January 1854 Ichinoseki, Mutsu, Japan
- Died: 28 November 1926 (aged 72) Nakameguro, Tokyo, Japan
- Resting place: Tama Cemetery
- Occupation: Politician, Diplomat

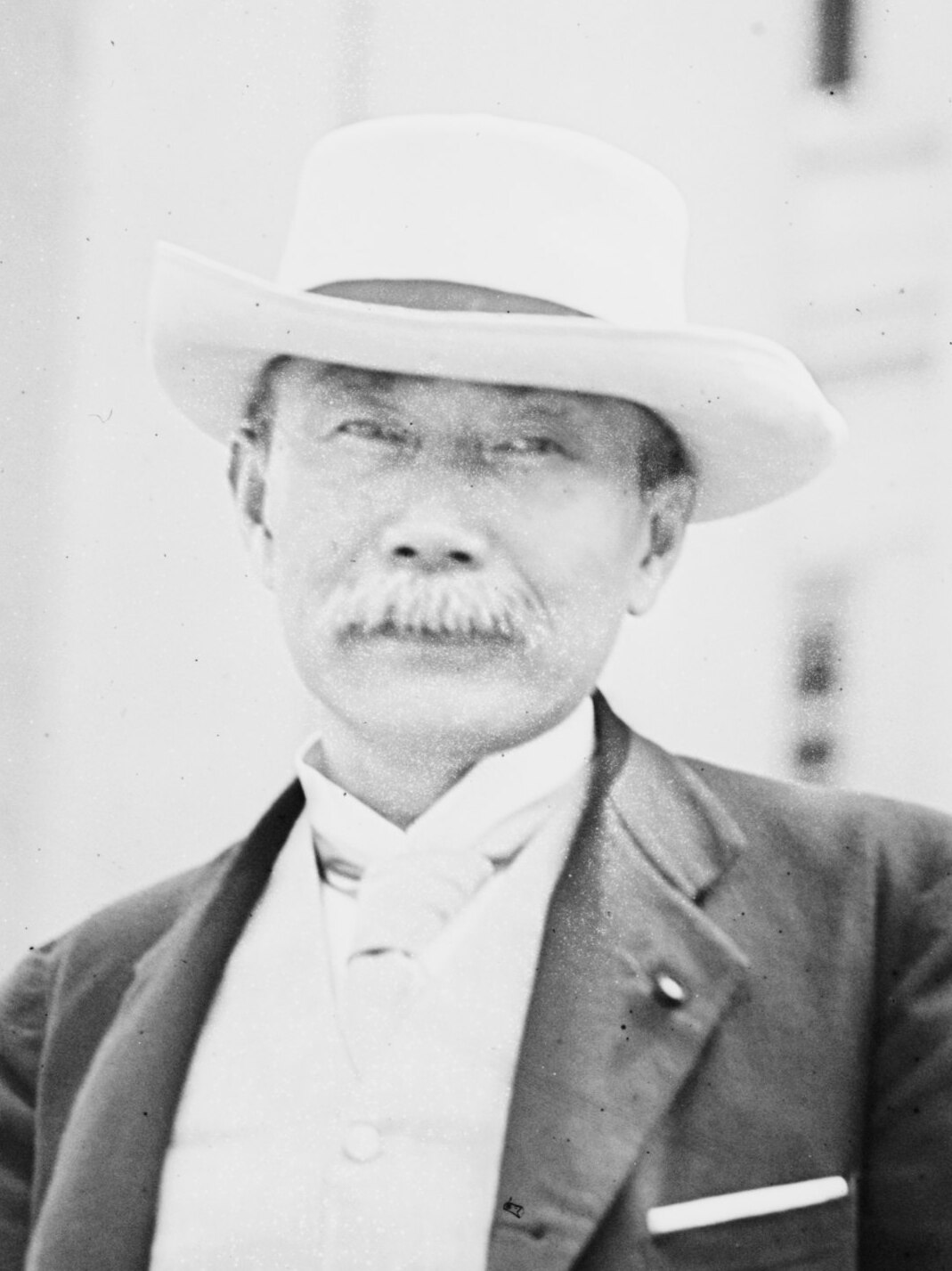
Ambassador Takahira Kogoro leaving the U. S. State Department, Washington, D. C. in 1908

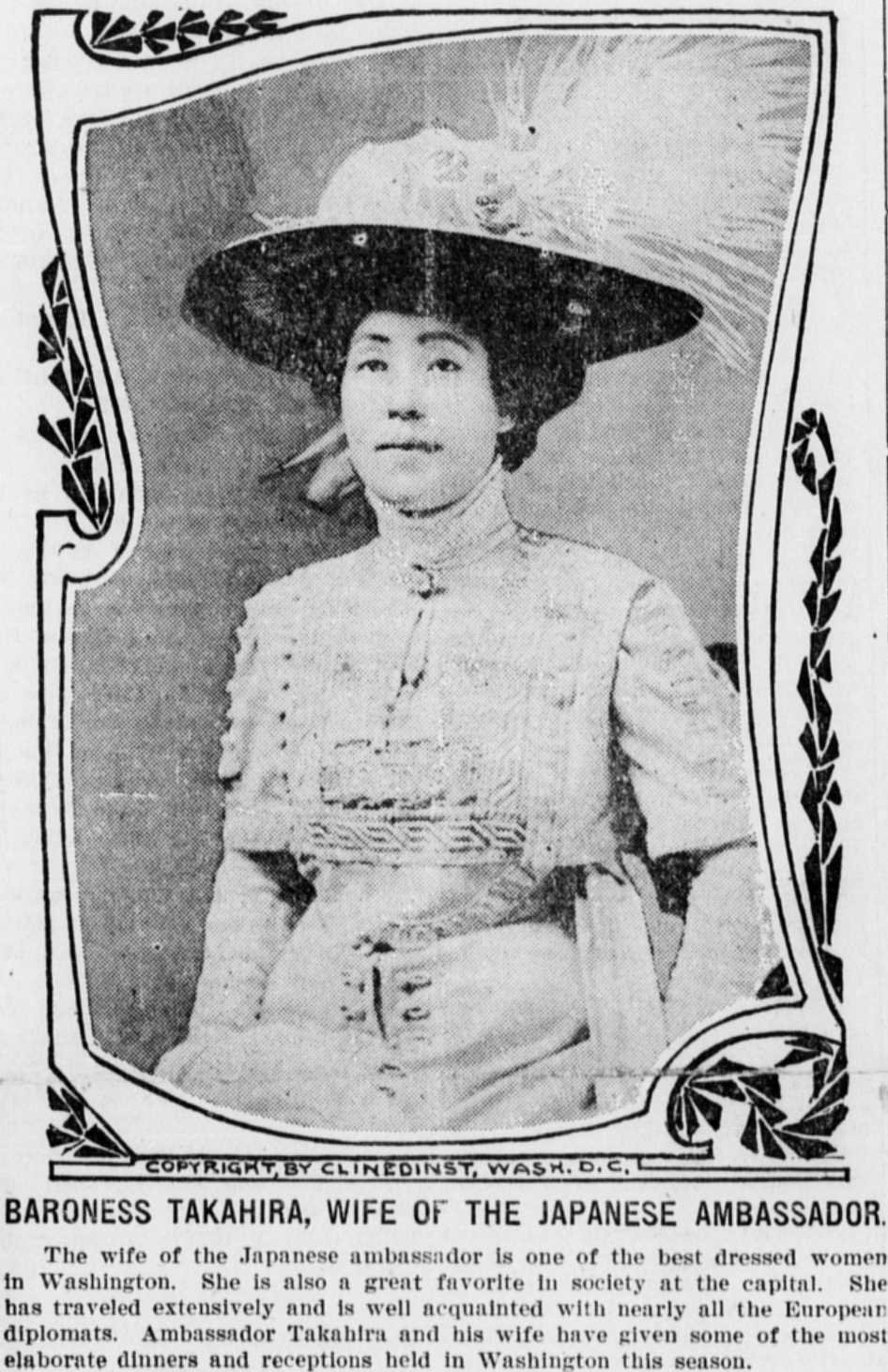
Baroness Takahira, wife of the Ambassador Takahira in 1909

Baron Takahira Kogorō KCMG (高平 小五郎; 29 January 1854 – 28 November 1926) was a Japanese diplomat and ambassador to the United States from 1900 to 1909.

== Biography ==
Takahira was born in what is now Ichinoseki, Iwate. From relatively modest beginnings, Takahira was to become a graduate of Kaisei Gakkō (the predecessor to Tokyo Imperial University).

== Career diplomat ==
In 1876, he joined the Ministry of Foreign Affairs. His first posting to the United States in 1879 was as an attaché; and he was promoted to secretary in 1881. During a return to Asia, he served briefly as chargé d'affaires in Korea and as Consul General in Shanghai. In 1887, he returned to the United States as Consul General in New York City. He had postings in Europe as Minister-Resident to the Netherlands and Denmark, and as Minister Plenipotentiary at Rome, Vienna, and Bern, before his 1901 return to Washington, D.C. He then continued as Japan's minister in the United States from 1901 through 1905.

Negotiating the Treaty of Portsmouth (1905) -- from left to right: the Russians at far side of table are Korostovetz, Navohoff, Witte, Rosen, Plancoff; and the Japanese at near side of table are Adachi, Ochiai, Komura, Takahira, Satō. The large conference table is today preserved at the Museum Meiji Mura in Inuyama, Aichi Prefecture, Japan.

Takahira participated in a number of important Japanese-US negotiations. Takahira was one of the principals of the Japanese delegation negotiating with the Russians to conclude the Treaty of Portsmouth, which ended the Russo-Japanese War.

In 1907, Takahira was named Ambassador to Rome. The Foreign Ministry called him back to Washington, D.C. in 1908-1909.

As principal negotiator for Japan, his name is commemorated in the 1908 Root–Takahira Agreement, which was intended to ease Japanese-US tension by defining each nation's role in the Pacific arena and China.

Takahira later elevated to danshaku (baron) under the kazoku peerage system, and was appointed to the House of Peers, and subsequently served on the Privy Council.

== Honors ==
- Order of the Sacred Treasure, Grand Cordon.
- Hon. Knight Commander of the Order of St. Michael and St. George (KCMG) (20 February 1906)
- Grand Cordon of the Order of the Rising Sun (1 April 1906)
