= Kensuke Horinouchi =

Japanese diplomat

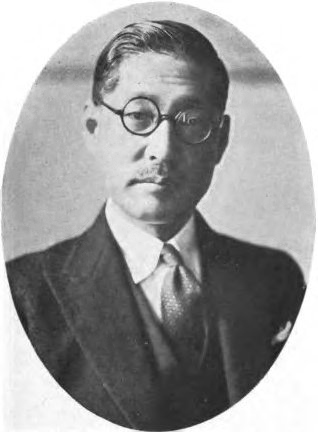

Kensuke Horinouchi (堀内 謙介, March 30, 1886 – November 1, 1979) was a Japanese politician who served as ambassador to the United States and ambassador to Taiwan.

== Diplomatic career ==
Horinouchi was a member of the Japanese delegation at the 1919 Paris Peace Conference, and later noted that "Japan was totally absorbed in its own issues" at said conference.

During the 1930s, he served as vice minister of foreign affairs and as a councillor at the Embassy of Japan in Washington, D.C. He served as consul general in New York during the early 1930s.

In October 1938, Horinouchi was announced as the successor to Hiroshi Saitō as ambassador to the United States. He took office in April 1939. He was recalled from the post in 1940, and was criticised for apparently failing to promote Japanese interests in relation to the trading of aviation gasoline. Despite this, he continued to be engaged in diplomatic relations between the two countries.

In 1955, Horinouchi was appointed Japanese ambassador to Taiwan, succeeding Kenkichi Yoshizawa on his retirement. He resigned from the position in 1959.

== Other work ==
In 1946, Horinouchi was elected the first chairman of Licensed Agencies for Relief in Asia (LARA), which gave the organisation contacts and relevance in Japan.

== Personal life ==
Horinouchi was a Christian.

Diplomatic posts
Preceded by Hiroshi Saitō	Japanese Ambassador to the United States; April 1939 – December 1940	Succeeded by Kichisaburō Nomura
Preceded by Kenkichi Yoshizawa	Japanese Ambassador to Taiwan; 1955 – 1959	Succeeded by Sadao Iguchi
