= Komura Jutarō =

Japanese diplomat (1855–1911)

Marquess Komura Jutarō
- 小村 壽太郞
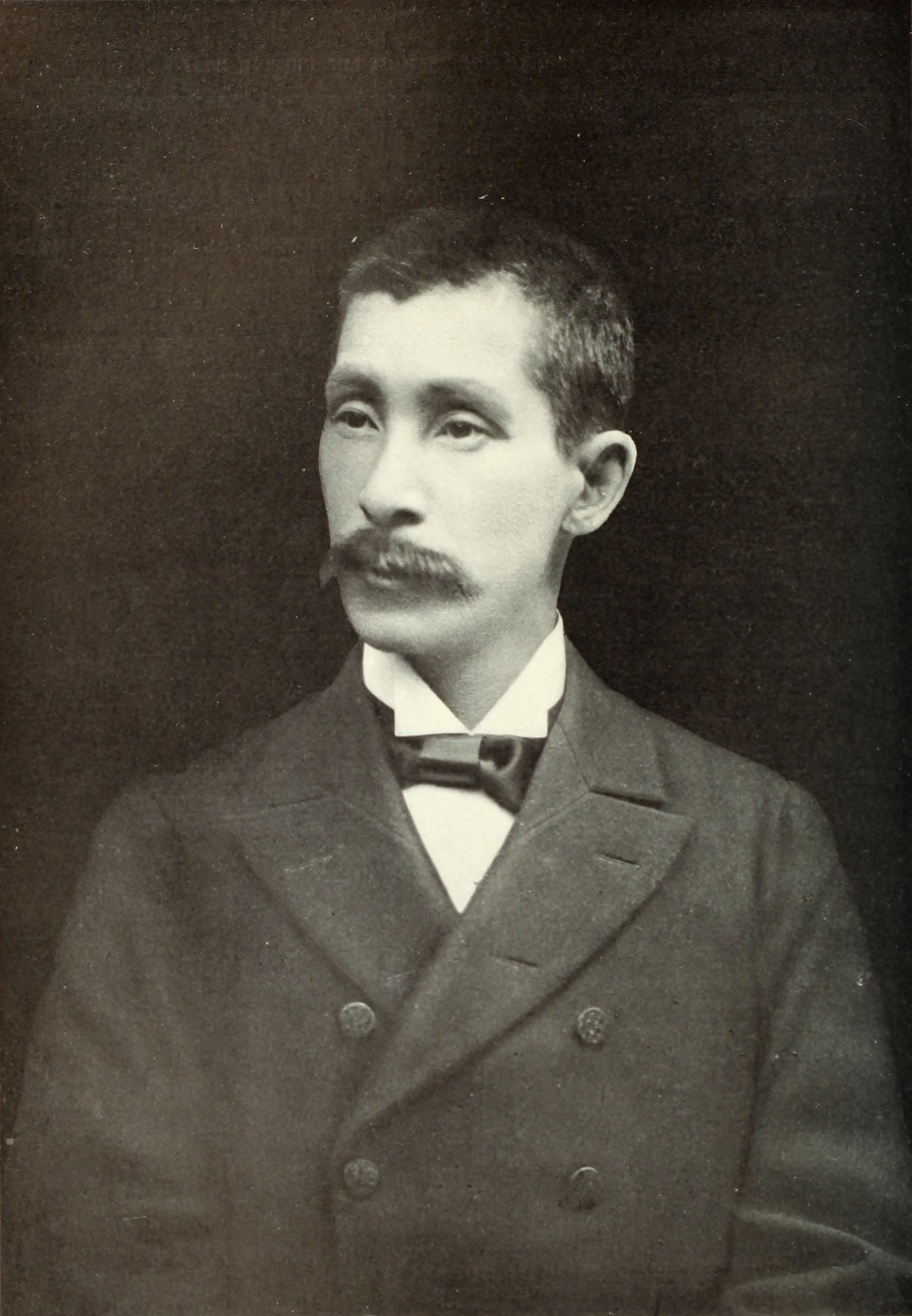
- Marquess Komura Jutarō

Minister for Foreign Affairs
- In office 27 August 1908 – 30 August 1911
- Prime Minister: Katsura Tarō
- Preceded by: Terauchi Masatake
- Succeeded by: Uchida Kōsai
- In office 21 September 1901 – 7 January 1906
- Prime Minister: Katsura Tarō
- Preceded by: Sone Arasuke
- Succeeded by: Katō Takaaki

Member of the House of Peers
- In office 21 April 1911 – 26 November 1911 Hereditary peerage

Personal details
- Born: 16 September 1855 Obi, Nichinan, Japan
- Died: 25 November 1911 (aged 56) Hayama, Kanagawa, Japan
- Resting place: Aoyama Cemetery
- Spouse: Komura Machi
- Education: Tokyo Imperial University; Harvard University

Marquess Komura Jutarō (小村 壽太郞; September 16, 1855 – November 25, 1911) was a Japanese statesman and diplomat who served as Minister for Foreign Affairs from 1901 to 1906 and 1908 to 1911.

== Early life ==
Komura was born to a lower-ranking samurai family in the service of the Obi Domain in Kyushu's Hyūga Province (now Nichinan, Miyazaki Prefecture). He attended the Daigaku Nankō, the predecessor of Tokyo Imperial University. In 1875, he was selected by the Ministry of Education as one of the first students to study abroad under a government scholarship. At Harvard University, Komura shared lodgings with the fellow Japanese student Kaneko Kentarō. Komura graduated from Harvard Law School in 1878.

While at Harvard, Kaneko and Komura visited the home of Alexander Graham Bell and spoke on an experimental telephone with a fellow Japanese student, Izawa Shunji. According to Bell, this was the first instance of any language besides English being spoken into the new invention.

== Career ==
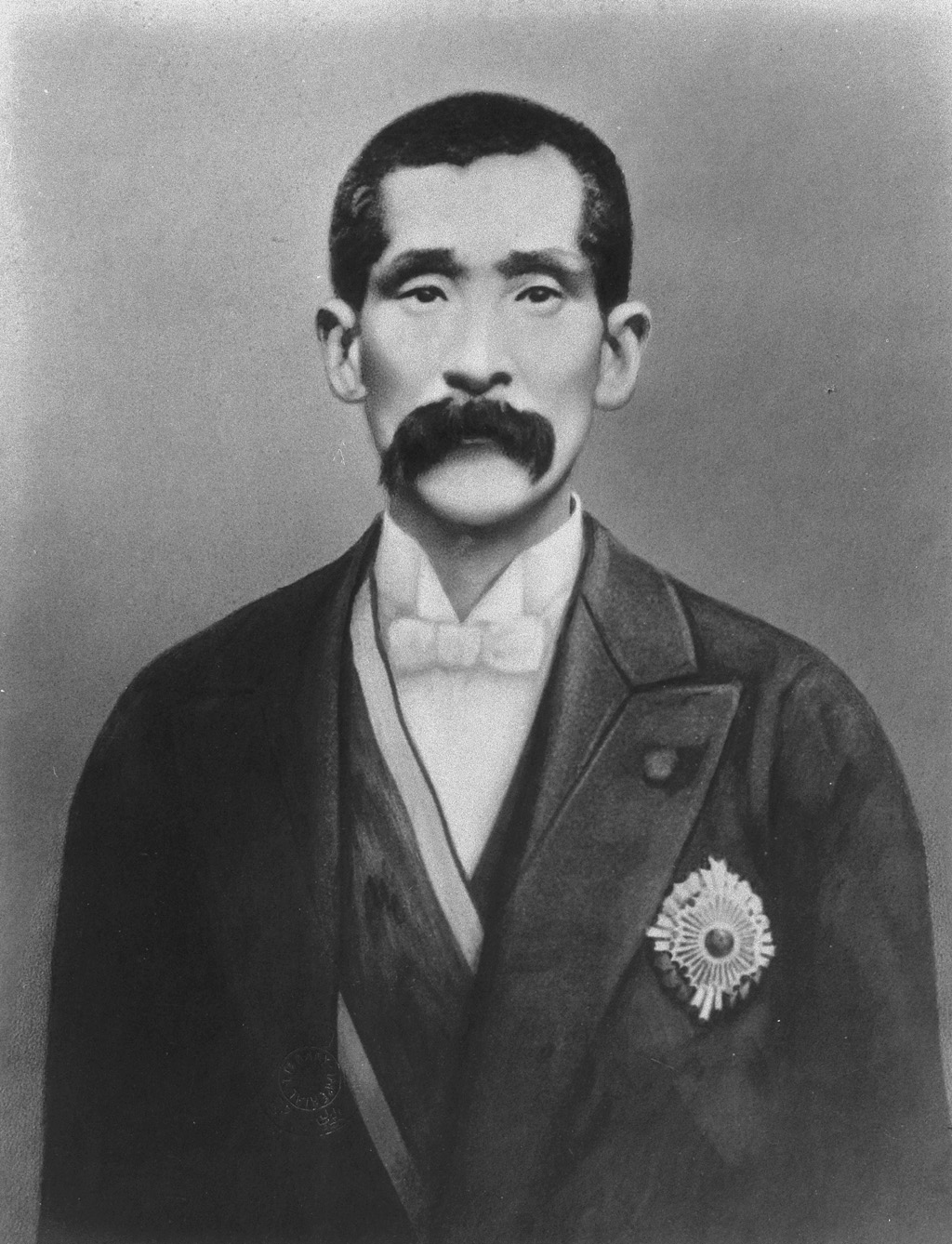
Komura Jutarō

In 1880, Komura joined the Ministry of Justice and, after serving as a judge of the Supreme Court of Japan, transferred in 1884 to the Translation Bureau in the Ministry of Foreign Affairs.

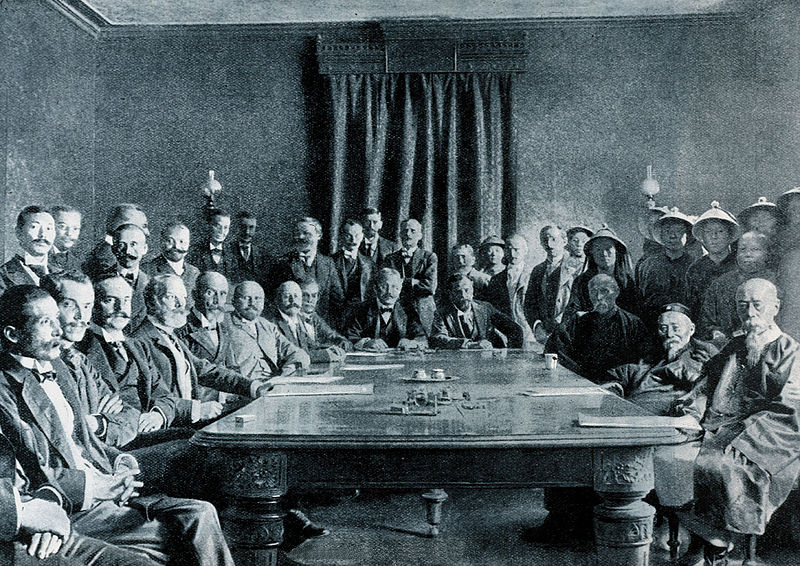
Signing of the Boxer Protocol. Left, from left to right: F.M Knobel from Netherland (only his hands are visible); Komura J. from Japan; G. S. Raggi from Italy; Joostens from Belgium; C. von Walhborn from Austria-Hungary; B. J. Cologán from Spain; M. von Giers from Russia; A. Mumm for German Empire; E. M. Satow from United Kingdom; W. W. Rockhill from United States; P. Beau from France; I-Kuang; Li Hongzhang; Prince Qing

In 1893, Komura was the chargé d'affaires at the Japanese legation in Beijing, in Qing dynasty China. In that position, he conveyed to the Chinese government Japan's intention of dispatching troops to Korea under the provisions of the Treaty of Tientsin to subdue the Tonghak Rebellion, which led to the First Sino-Japanese War. During the war, Komura was appointed as civilian administrator for territories Japan had captured in Manchuria. He was also a key figure in the negotiations to end the war, culminating in the Treaty of Shimonoseki, which he helped to draft.

Following the assassination of Queen Min of Korea, Komura was dispatched to replace Miura Gorō as the Japanese minister to Korea. In his position as resident minister in Korea, he negotiated the Komura-Weber Memorandum in May 1896 with his Russian counterpart, Karl Ivanovich Weber, to allow joint interference in Korean internal affairs by the Japanese and the Russian Empires.

Komura served as Vice Minister for Foreign Affairs until September 1898, when he was named ambassador to Washington, D.C.

In September 1901, Komura became Minister for Foreign Affairs under the first Katsura administration, and he signed the Boxer Protocol on behalf of Japan. He was elevated into the kazoku peerage with the title of baron (danshaku) in 1902 and decorated with the 1st class of the Order of the Rising Sun.

In 1902, Komura helped to conclude the Anglo-Japanese Alliance in 1902. His tenure as foreign minister was marked with increasing tension between Japan and Russia over Korea and Manchuria, which cumulated in the Russo-Japanese War in 1904–1905.

Negotiating the Treaty of Portsmouth (1905). From left to right: the Russians at the far side of table are Korostovetz, Nabokov, Witte, Rosen, Plancon, and the Japanese at the near side of table are Adachi, Ochiai, Komura, Takahira, Satō. The large conference table is now preserved at the Museum Meiji Mura in Inuyama, Aichi Prefecture, Japan.

After the withdrawal of Russian forces in the region, Russian diplomats Witte and Rosen and their Japanese colleagues Takahira Ochiai, Komura, and others met in Portsmouth to sign the peace treaty. During the negotiations, Witte tried to keep Russia's rights on the southern part of Sakhalin island, referring to the Treaty of Saint Petersburg (1875), which gave the Kuril Islands to Japan in exchange for Russian rights in Sakhalin, but Komura declared that "war cancels all treaties."

The war was ended with Komura's signature on behalf of the Japanese government of the Treaty of Portsmouth, which was highly unpopular in Japan and led to the Hibiya incendiary incident.

Komura also met with E. H. Harriman, the American railway magnate, to propose a joint venture between Harriman's conglomerate and Japan towards the development of the South Manchuria Railway. On his return to Japan, he found that the agreement was opposed by the genrō and so it was not implemented.

Komura also met with Chinese representatives in Beijing and signed the Peking Treaty of December 1905, which transferred the former Russian rights in southern Manchuria to Japan.

For those services, Komura was awarded the Order of the Paulownia Flowers in 1906 and was appointed to become a member of the Privy Council.

From June 1906 to August 1908, Komura served as ambassador to Britain and was made a Knight Commander of the Order of the Bath by King Edward VII and a member of the Royal Victorian Order. On his return to Tokyo, he resumed the post of foreign minister in the second Katsura administration and signed the Root–Takahira Agreement with the United States. His peerage title was also elevated to that of Count ("hakushaku") in 1907.

Komura also played a key role in the Japan-Korea Annexation Treaty in 1910 and in concluding various international agreements in 1911 to restore Japan's tariff autonomy. He was elevated to the title of Marquis ("koshaku") on April 21, 1911.

Suffering from tuberculosis in his final years, Komura moved to the seaside resort of Hayama in Kanagawa Prefecture, but he died of the disease on November 26, 1911. His grave is at Aoyama Cemetery, Tokyo.

== In popular culture ==
In Ryōtarō Shiba's semi-historical work Saka no Ue no Kumo, Komura inherited massive debts from his father, which he had difficulty with repayment. As a result, he wore the same frayed frock coat for years, regardless of season or occasion. That, combined with his short stature and a large mustache, led to the derisive nickname of "the rat minister" in the diplomatic community in his early career. In the Japanese Taiga drama adaptation of Shiba’s work, the role of Komura is played by actor Naoto Takenaka.

== Honors ==
From the article in the Japanese Wikipedia

=== Peerages ===
- Baron - 7 February 1902
- Count - 21 September 1907
- Marquess - 21 April 1911

=== Decorations and ranks ===
- Order of the Sacred Treasure, Third Class (31 October 1895)
- Grand Cordon of the Order of the Rising Sun (27 February 1902; Second Class: 21 October 1899)
- Hon. Knight Grand Cross of the Order of St Michael and St George (GCMG) - 8 July 1905.
- Grand Cordon of the Order of the Paulownia Flowers - 1 April 1906
- Hon. Knight Grand Cross of the Order of the Bath (GCB) - 1907.
- Hon. Knight Grand Cross of the Royal Victorian Order (GCVO) - 7 May 1907.
- Second degree in the official order of precedence - 26 November 1911 (posthumous)

An International Center Komura Memorial Hall was built in Nichinan, Miyazaki on the former Obi domain of the Komura family in honour of Komura Jutarō and his accomplishments in Japan foreign relations expansion. This memorial and museum is presented on the web site of the Ministry of Land, Infrastructure, Transport and Tourism for the island of Kyūshū.

== See also ==
- List of Ambassadors from Japan to South Korea

Political offices
Preceded by Sone Arasuke	Minister for Foreign Affairs; Sept 1901 – Jan 1906	Succeeded by Katō Takaaki
Preceded by Terauchi Masatake	Minister for Foreign Affairs; Aug 1908 – Aug 1911	Succeeded by Uchida Kōsai
Diplomatic posts
Preceded by Miura Gorō	Envoy to Korea; 1895–1896	Succeeded by Hara Takashi
Preceded by Hara Takashi	Vice Minister for Foreign Affairs; 1896–1898	Succeeded by Hatoyama Kazuo
Preceded by Hoshi Tōru	Envoy to the United States; 1898–1900	Succeeded by Takahira Kogorō
Preceded by Hayashi Tadasu	Envoy to Russia; 1900	Succeeded by Sutemi Chinda
Preceded by Nishi Tokujirō	Envoy to China; 1900–1901	Succeeded by Uchida Kōsai
Preceded by Hayashi Tadasu	Ambassador to Britain; 1906–1908	Succeeded by Katō Takaaki
