= Minister for Foreign Affairs (Japan) =

Japanese cabinet role

Minister of Foreign Affairs
- Emblem of the Government of Japan

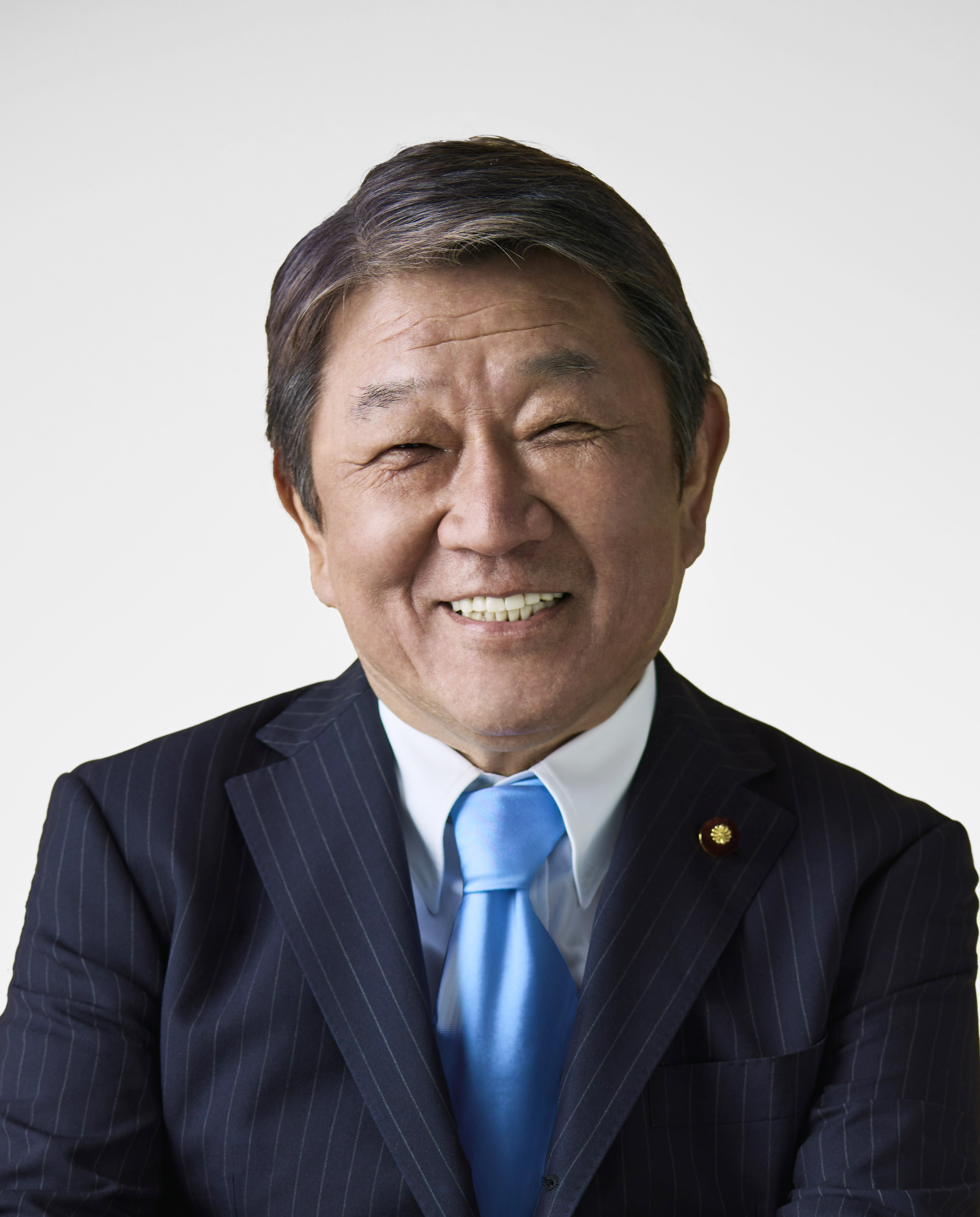
- Incumbent; Toshimitsu Motegi since 21 October 2025
- Ministry of Foreign Affairs
- Style: His Excellency
- Member of: Cabinet of Japan; National Security Council; National Intelligence Council
- Reports to: Prime Minister of Japan
- Appointer: Prime Minister subject to formal attestation by the Emperor
- Formation: December 22, 1885; 140 years ago
- Deputy: State Minister of Foreign Affairs
- Salary: ¥20,916,000

The minister for foreign affairs (外務大臣, Gaimu Daijin) is a member of the cabinet of Japan and is the leader and chief executive of the Ministry of Foreign Affairs. The minister is responsible for implementing Japan's foreign policy and is also a statutory member of the National Security Council. The minister is nominated by the prime minister and is appointed by the emperor of Japan.

Since the end of the allied occupation of Japan, the position has been one of the most powerful in the cabinet, as Japan's economic interests have long relied on foreign relations. The recent efforts of former prime minister Junichiro Koizumi and Shinzo Abe to establish a more interventionist foreign policy have also heightened the importance of the position.

The current minister for foreign affairs is Toshimitsu Motegi, who took office on October 21, 2025.

== List of ministers for foreign affairs ==
- Italics indicates subject served as Acting Foreign Minister.
- **Bold** indicates subject served concurrently as Prime Minister for a period of time.

=== Empire of Japan (1885–1945) ===
#	Portrait	Name	Took office	Left office
1		Count Inoue Kaoru	December 1885	September 1887
–		Count **Itō Hirobumi**	**September 1887**	**February 1888**
2		Count Ōkuma Shigenobu (1st)	February 1888	December 1889
3		Viscount Aoki Shūzō (1st)	December 1889	May 1891
4		Viscount Enomoto Takeaki	May 1891	August 1892
5		Viscount Mutsu Munemitsu	August 1892	May 1896
6		Marquis Saionji Kinmochi (1st)	May 1896	September 1896
2		Count Ōkuma Shigenobu (2nd)	September 1896	November 1897
7		Baron Nishi Tokujirō	November 1897	January 1898
**2**		Count **Ōkuma Shigenobu** **(3rd)**	**January 1898**	**June 1898**
3		Viscount Aoki Shūzō (2nd)	June 1898	October 1900
8		Katō Takaaki (1st)	October 1900	June 1901
9		Sone Arasuke	June 1901	September 1901
10		Baron Komura Jutarō (1st)	September 1901	January 1906
8		Katō Takaaki (2nd)	January 1906	March 1906
6		Marquis Saionji Kinmochi (2nd)	March 1906	May 1906
11		Count Hayashi Tadasu	May 1906	July 1908
12		General Viscount Terauchi Masatake (1st)	July 1908	August 1908
10		Marquis Komura Jutarō (2nd)	August 1908	August 1911
13		Viscount Uchida Kosai (1st)	August 1911	December 1912
**14**		Prince **Katsura Tarō**	**December 1912**	**January 1913**
8		Baron Katō Takaaki (3rd)	January 1913	February 1913
15		Baron Makino Nobuaki	February 1913	April 1914
8		Baron Katō Takaaki (4th)	April 1914	August 1915
2		Count Ōkuma Shigenobu (4th)	August 1915	October 1915
16		Viscount Ishii Kikujirō	October 1915	October 1916
12		Marshal Count Terauchi Masatake (2nd)	**October 1916**	**November 1916**
17		Viscount Motono Ichirō	November 1916	April 1918
18		Baron Gotō Shinpei	April 1918	September 1918
13		Count Uchida Kosai (2nd)	September 1918	2 September 1923
**19**		Admiral Count **Yamamoto Gonnohyōe**	**2 September 1923**	**19 September 1923**
20		Baron Ijuin Hikokichi	September 1923	January 1924
21		Baron Matsui Keishirō	January 1924	June 1924
22		Baron Kijūrō Shidehara (1st)	June 1924	April 1927
**23**		Baron Tanaka Giichi	**April 1927**	**July 1929**
22		Baron Kijūrō Shidehara (2nd)	July 1929	December 1931
**24**		**Inukai Tsuyoshi**	**December 1931**	**January 1932**
25		Kenkichi Yoshizawa	January 1932	May 1932
**26**		Admiral Viscount **Saitō Makoto**	**May 1932**	**July 1932**
13		Count Uchida Kosai (3rd)	July 1932	September 1933
**27**		**Kōki Hirota** **(1st)**	September 1933 (Note: Appointed as Prime Minister during the tenure.)	**April 1936**
28		Hachirō Arita (1st)	April 1936	February 1937
**29**		**Senjuro Hayashi**	**February 1937**	**March 1937**
30		Naotake Satō	March 1937	June 1937
27		Kōki Hirota (2nd)	June 1937	May 1938
31		General Kazushige Ugaki	May 1938	September 1938
**32**		Prince **Fumimaro Konoe**	**September 1938**	**October 1938**
28		Hachirō Arita (2nd)	October 1938	January 1939
**33**		General **Nobuyuki Abe**	**January 1939**	**August 1939**
34		Admiral Kichisaburō Nomura	August 1939	January 1940
28		Hachirō Arita (3rd)	January 1940	July 1940
35		Yōsuke Matsuoka	July 1940	July 1941
36		Admiral Teijirō Toyoda	July 1941	October 1941
37		Shigenori Tōgō (1st)	October 1941	September 1942
**38**		General **Hideki Tōjō**	**1 September 1942**	**17 September 1942**
39		Masayuki Tani	September 1942	April 1943
40		Mamoru Shigemitsu (1st)	April 1943	April 1945
**41**		Admiral Baron **Kantarō Suzuki**	**April 1945**	**April 1945**
37		Shigenori Tōgō (2nd)	April 1945	August 1945
40		Mamoru Shigemitsu (2nd)	August 1945	September 1945

=== Postwar Japan (1945–present) ===
Liberal (1945)
Imperial Family
Progressive
Socialist
Democratic (1947)
Democratic Liberal
Liberal (1950)
Democratic (1954)
Liberal Democratic
Japan Renewal Party
Japan New Party
Liberal League
Democratic

Foreign Minister			Term of office			Prime Minister
#	Portrait	Name	Took office	Left office	Days	Prime Minister
43		**Shigeru Yoshida**	**September 15, 1945**	**May 24, 1947**	**616**	Prince Naruhiko Higashikuni
43		**Shigeru Yoshida**	**September 15, 1945**	**May 24, 1947**	**616**	Kijūrō Shidehara
43		**Shigeru Yoshida**	**September 15, 1945**	**May 24, 1947**	**616**	Shigeru Yoshida
–		Tetsu Katayama	May 24, 1947	June 1, 1947	8	Tetsu Katayama
44		**Hitoshi Ashida**	**June 1, 1947**	**October 15, 1948**	**502**	Tetsu Katayama
44		**Hitoshi Ashida**	**June 1, 1947**	**October 15, 1948**	**502**	Hitoshi Ashida
(43)		**Shigeru Yoshida**	**October 15, 1948**	**April 30, 1952**	**1293**	Shigeru Yoshida
45		Katsuo Okazaki	April 30, 1952	December 10, 1954	954	Shigeru Yoshida
(40)		Mamoru Shigemitsu	December 10, 1954	November 22, 1955	744	Ichirō Hatoyama
(40)		Mamoru Shigemitsu	November 22, 1955	December 23, 1956	744	Ichirō Hatoyama
–		Tanzan Ishibashi	December 23, 1956	December 23, 1956	0	Tanzan Ishibashi
46		**Nobusuke Kishi**	**December 23, 1956**	**July 10, 1957**	**199**	Tanzan Ishibashi
46		**Nobusuke Kishi**	**December 23, 1956**	**July 10, 1957**	**199**	Nobusuke Kishi
47		Aiichirō Fujiyama	July 10, 1957	July 19, 1960	1105	Nobusuke Kishi
48		Zentaro Kosaka	July 19, 1960	July 18, 1962	729	Hayato Ikeda
49		Masayoshi Ōhira	July 18, 1962	July 18, 1964	731	Hayato Ikeda
50		Shiina Etsusaburo	July 18, 1964	December 3, 1966	868	Hayato Ikeda
50		Shiina Etsusaburo	July 18, 1964	December 3, 1966	868	Eisaku Satō
51		Takeo Miki	December 3, 1966	October 29, 1968	696	Eisaku Satō
–		**Eisaku Satō**	**October 29, 1968**	**November 30, 1968**	**32**	Eisaku Satō
52		Kiichi Aichi	November 30, 1968	July 9, 1971	951	Eisaku Satō
53		Takeo Fukuda	July 9, 1971	July 7, 1972	364	Eisaku Satō
(49)		Masayoshi Ōhira	July 7, 1972	July 16, 1974	739	Kakuei Tanaka
54		Toshio Kimura	July 16, 1974	December 9, 1974	146	Kakuei Tanaka
55		Kiichi Miyazawa	December 9, 1974	September 5, 1976	646	Takeo Miki
(48)		Zentaro Kosaka	September 5, 1976	December 24, 1976	100	Takeo Miki
56		Iichirō Hatoyama	December 24, 1976	November 28, 1977	339	Takeo Fukuda
57		Sunao Sonoda	November 28, 1977	November 8, 1979	710	Takeo Fukuda
57		Sunao Sonoda	November 28, 1977	November 8, 1979	710	Masayoshi Ōhira
58		Saburō Ōkita	November 8, 1979	July 17, 1980	252	Masayoshi Ōhira
59		Masayoshi Ito	July 17, 1980	May 18, 1981	305	Zenkō Suzuki
(57)		Sunao Sonoda	May 18, 1981	November 30, 1981	196	Zenkō Suzuki
60		Yoshio Sakurauchi	November 30, 1981	November 27, 1982	362	Zenkō Suzuki
61		Shintaro Abe	November 27, 1982	July 22, 1986	1333	Yasuhiro Nakasone
62		Tadashi Kuranari	July 22, 1986	November 6, 1987	472	Yasuhiro Nakasone
63		Sosuke Uno	November 6, 1987	June 3, 1989	575	Noboru Takeshita
64		Hiroshi Mitsuzuka	June 3, 1989	August 10, 1989	68	Sosuke Uno
65		Taro Nakayama	August 10, 1989	November 5, 1991	817	Toshiki Kaifu
66		Michio Watanabe	November 5, 1991	April 7, 1993	519	Kiichi Miyazawa
67		Kabun Mutō	April 7, 1993	August 9, 1993	124	Kiichi Miyazawa
68		Tsutomu Hata	August 9, 1993	April 28, 1994	262	Morihiro Hosokawa
69		Koji Kakizawa	April 28, 1994	June 30, 1994	63	Tsutomu Hata
70		Yōhei Kōno	June 30, 1994	January 11, 1996	560	Tomiichi Murayama
71		Yukihiko Ikeda	January 11, 1996	September 11, 1997	609	Ryutaro Hashimoto
72		Keizo Obuchi	September 11, 1997	July 30, 1998	322	Ryutaro Hashimoto
73		Masahiko Kōmura	July 30, 1998	October 5, 1999	432	Keizo Obuchi
(70)		Yōhei Kōno	October 5, 1999	April 26, 2001	569	Keizo Obuchi
(70)		Yōhei Kōno	October 5, 1999	April 26, 2001	569	Yoshiro Mori
74		Makiko Tanaka	April 26, 2001	January 29, 2002	278	Junichiro Koizumi
75		**Junichiro Koizumi** **(Acting)**	**January 29, 2002**	**February 1, 2002**	**3**	Junichiro Koizumi
76		Yoriko Kawaguchi	February 1, 2002	September 27, 2004	969	Junichiro Koizumi
77		Nobutaka Machimura	September 27, 2004	October 31, 2005	399	Junichiro Koizumi
78		Tarō Asō	October 31, 2005	August 27, 2007	665	Junichiro Koizumi
78		Tarō Asō	October 31, 2005	August 27, 2007	665	Shinzō Abe
(77)		Nobutaka Machimura	August 27, 2007	September 26, 2007	30	Shinzō Abe
(73)		Masahiko Kōmura	September 26, 2007	September 24, 2008	364	Yasuo Fukuda
79		Hirofumi Nakasone	September 24, 2008	September 16, 2009	357	Tarō Asō
80		Katsuya Okada	September 16, 2009	September 17, 2010	366	Yukio Hatoyama
80		Katsuya Okada	September 16, 2009	September 17, 2010	366	Naoto Kan
81		Seiji Maehara	September 17, 2010	March 7, 2011	171	Naoto Kan
–		Yukio Edano (Acting)	March 7, 2011	March 9, 2011	2	Naoto Kan
82		Takeaki Matsumoto	March 9, 2011	September 2, 2011	177	Naoto Kan
83		Kōichirō Genba	September 2, 2011	December 26, 2012	481	Yoshihiko Noda
84		Fumio Kishida	December 26, 2012	August 3, 2017	1681	Shinzō Abe
85		Taro Kono	August 3, 2017	September 11, 2019	769	Shinzō Abe
86		Toshimitsu Motegi	September 11, 2019	November 4, 2021	785	
86		Toshimitsu Motegi	September 11, 2019	November 4, 2021	785	Yoshihide Suga
**(84)**		**Fumio Kishida** **(Acting)**	**November 4, 2021**	**November 10, 2021**	**6**	Fumio Kishida
87		Yoshimasa Hayashi	November 10, 2021	September 13, 2023	672	Fumio Kishida
88		Yōko Kamikawa	September 13, 2023	October 1, 2024	384	Fumio Kishida
89		Takeshi Iwaya	October 1, 2024	October 21, 2025	385	Shigeru Ishiba
(86)		Toshimitsu Motegi	October 21, 2025	Incumbent	321	Sanae Takaichi

== See also ==
- Foreign minister
- Foreign policy of Japan
