= Konstantin Dmitrievich Nabokov =

Russian diplomat and author (1872–1927)

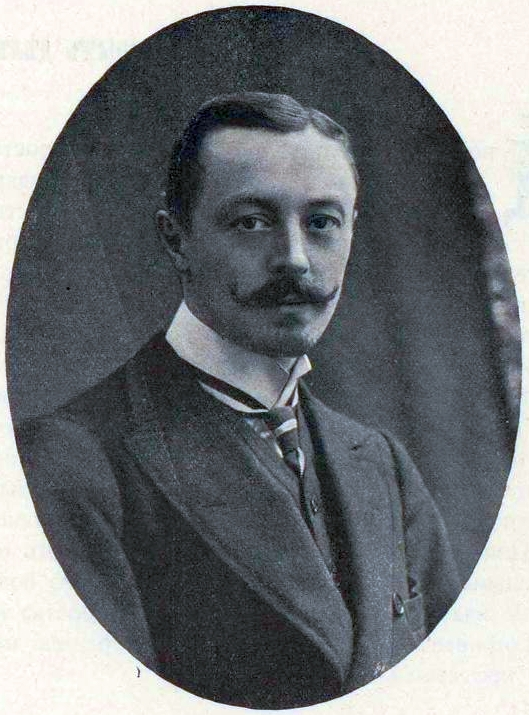
- Konstantin Nabokov
- Born: 1872
- Died: 1927 (aged 54–55)
- Occupations: Diplomat, author
- Known for: Serving as secretary of the Russian delegation during the signing of the Treaty of Portsmouth, involvement in the Grand Orient of Russia’s Peoples
- Notable work: The Ordeal of a Diplomat, Letters of a Russian Diplomat to an American Friend, 1906–1922
- Relatives: Vladimir Dmitrievich Nabokov (brother)
- Family: Nabokov

Konstantin Dmitrievich Nabokov (1872–1927) was a Russian diplomat and author. He was the brother of the politician and advocate Vladimir Dmitrievich Nabokov and a member of the aristocratic Nabokov family.

== Diplomatic career ==
Konstantin served as secretary of the Russian delegation during the signing of the Treaty of Portsmouth in 1905. He also worked as counselor of the Russian Embassy in London from December 15, 1915, to January 17, 1917, before advancing to the position of chargé d'affaires.

The signing of the Treaty of Portsmouth; Nabokov is seated second from the left on the far side of the table.

== Personal life ==
The poet Korney Chukovsky alleged in his diary that Konstantin was a homosexual who had taken a fancy to him.

Konstantin was listed as a member of the Grand Orient of Russia’s Peoples, a Masonic lodge.

== Bibliography ==
- The Ordeal of a Diplomat (1921)
- Letters of a Russian Diplomat to an American Friend, 1906–1922

== Sources ==
- Vladimir Nabokov: Speak, Memory, primarily chapter three
- Konstantin Nabokov: The Ordeal of a Diplomat
