= Masayuki Tani =

Japanese diplomat and politician (1889–1962)

- 谷 正之
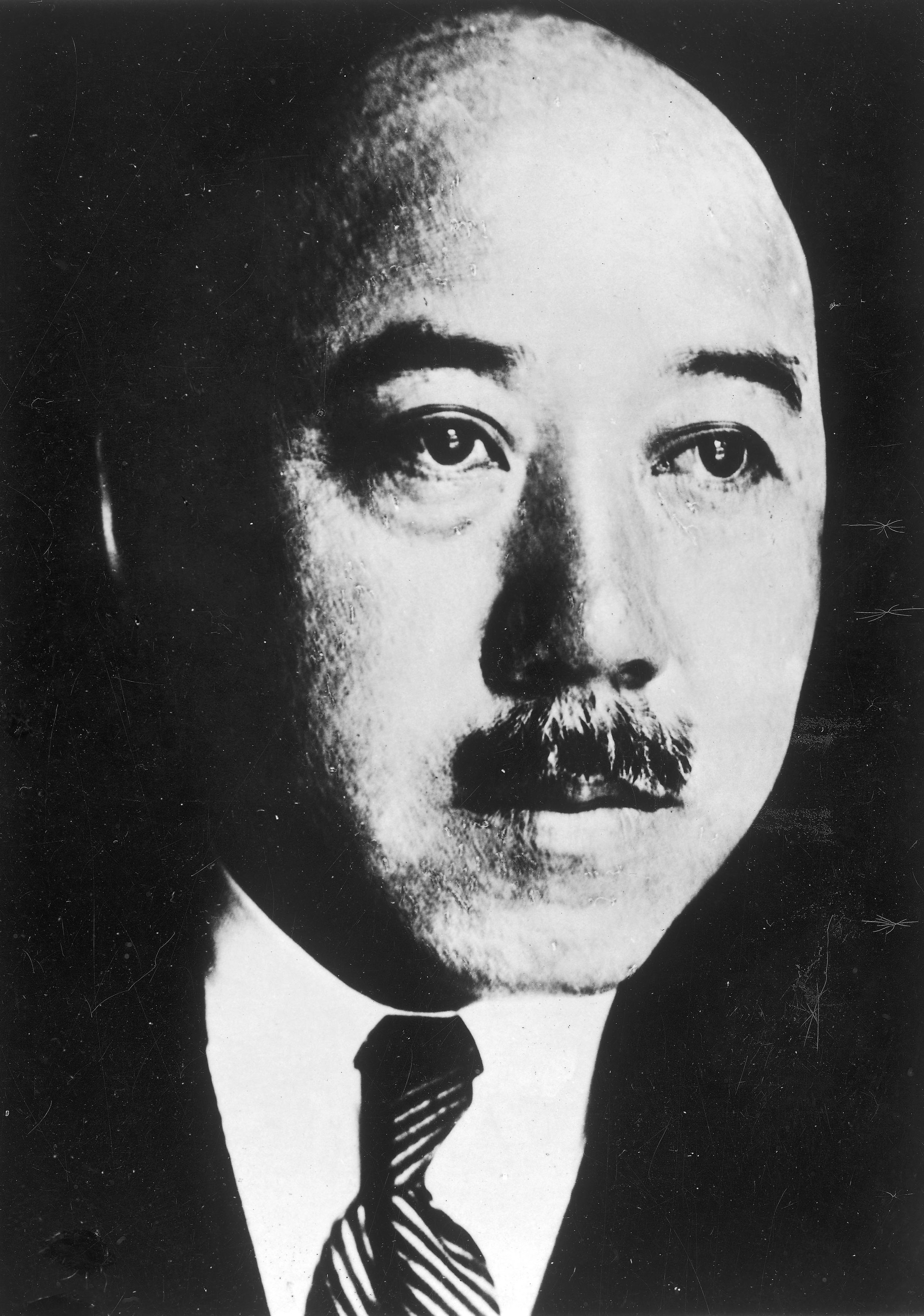

Minister for Foreign Affairs
- In office 17 September 1942 – 21 April 1943
- Prime Minister: Hideki Tojo
- Preceded by: Shigenori Tōgō
- Succeeded by: Mamoru Shigemitsu

Personal details
- Born: 9 February 1889 Kamimashiki, Kumamoto, Japan
- Died: 26 October 1962 (aged 73) Tokyo, Japan
- Children: 3
- Education: Tokyo Imperial University

Masayuki Tani (谷 正之; 9 February 1889 – 26 October 1962) was a Japanese diplomat and politician who was briefly foreign minister of Japan from September 1942 to 21 April 1943 during World War II.

== Career ==
Tani was a career diplomat before assuming ministerial roles. More specifically, he served at the embassy in France (1918–1923), United States (1927–1930) and Manchukuo (1933–1936). In 1930, he was chief of Asian Bureau in the ministry of foreign affairs. He also worked as counsellor to the Japanese embassy in Xinjing and as ambassador-at-large in China.

He served as vice minister of foreign affairs in the cabinet of Mitsumasa Yonai when appointed under then foreign minister Kichisaburō Nomura on 24 September 1939.

Then Tani served as information chief and also, foreign minister in the cabinet of Hideki Tōjō. He was appointed foreign minister on 17 September 1942. During his tenure, Japan continued to encourage a separate peace between Germany and the Soviet Union. However, his term was short. Since bureaucrats in the ministry of foreign affairs resented Tani, on 21 April 1943, he was replaced by Mamoru Shigemitsu. After that, he received Shigemitsu's former post of Japanese ambassador in Nanjing to the Reorganized National Government of China.

After World War II, Tani was detained as a suspect of war crimes until December 1948. However, he was not convicted. Then he served again as Japan's ambassador to the United States from March 1956 to April 1957, becoming the third post-war ambassador of Japan to the US.

== Personal life ==
Tani was married and had three children, a daughter and two sons.

Government offices
Preceded by Shigenori Tōgō	Minister for Foreign Affairs; 1942–1943	Succeeded by Mamoru Shigemitsu
Preceded by Nobufumi Itō	Director of the Cabinet Intelligence Bureau; 1941–1943	Succeeded by Eiji Amō
Preceded by Renzō Sawada	Vice Minister for Foreign Affairs; 1939–1940	Succeeded by Chuichi Ohashi
Diplomatic posts
Preceded by Sadao Iguchi	Ambassador to the United States; 1956–1957	Succeeded by Kōichirō Asakai
Preceded by Mamoru Shigemitsu	Ambassador to China (Wang Jingwei regime); 1943–1945	Position abolished
Preceded by Naokichi Matsunaga	Minister to Austria; 1936–1937	Position abolished
Preceded by Naokichi Matsunaga	Minister to Hungary; 1936–1937	Succeeded by Jun Matsumiya
