= Aimaro Satō =

Japanese diplomat

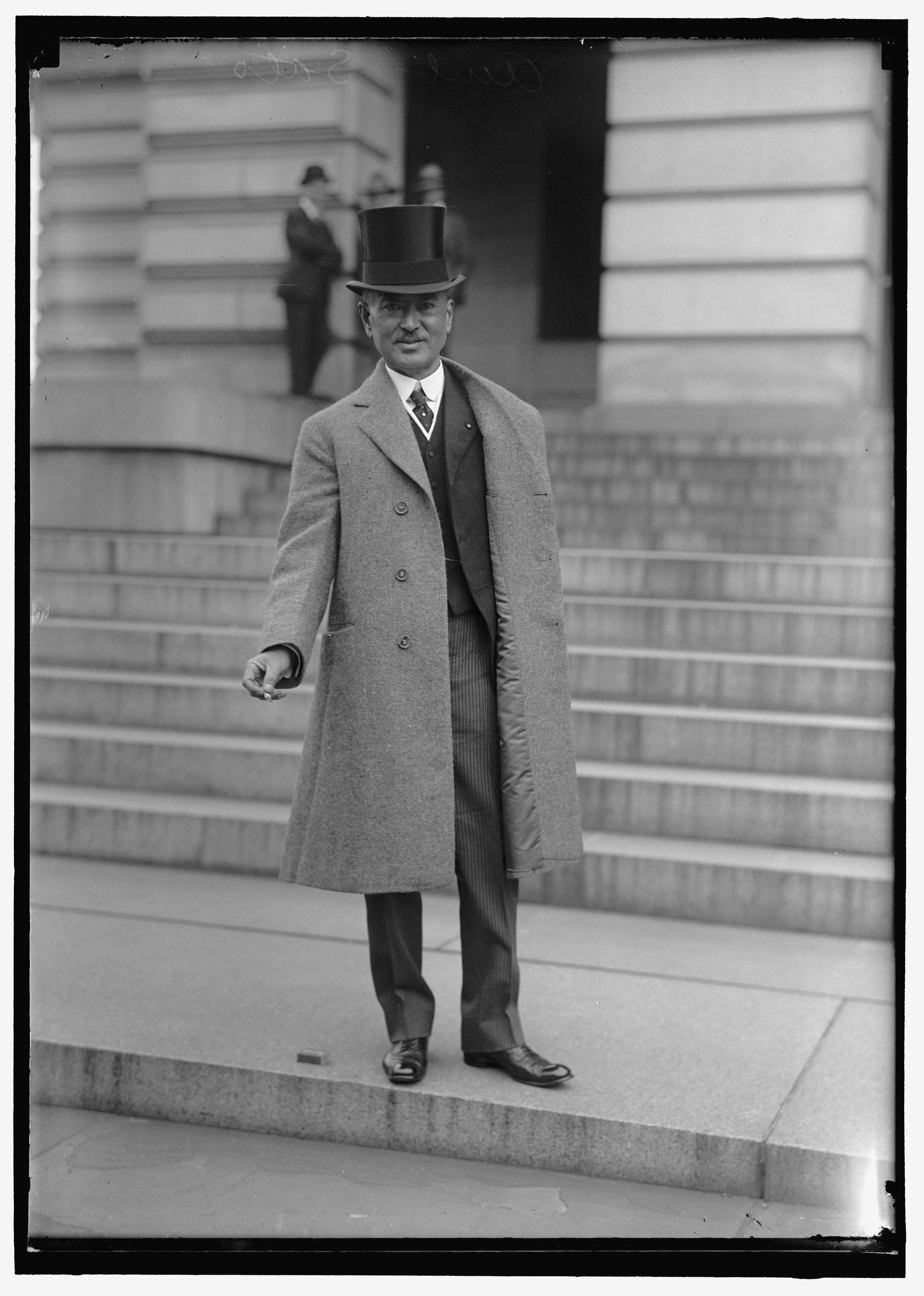

Japanese Ambassador to the United States
- In office 1916–1918
- Preceded by: Chinda Sutemi
- Succeeded by: Ishii Kikujirō

Personal details
- Born: April 22, 1857
- Died: January 12, 1934 (aged 76)
- Education: DePauw University

Aimaro Satō (佐藤 愛麿; April 22, 1857 – January 12, 1934), also known as Yoshimaro Satō and Henry Satoh, was the Japanese Ambassador to the United States from 1916 to 1918.

== Biography ==
He was born to a samurai family in Hirosaki, Japan 1857. He migrated to the United States and attended DePauw University, graduating in 1881. At DePauw he became a member of Beta Theta Pi. In 1896 he published an English-language work, Agitated Japan: The life of Ii Kamon-no-kami Naosuke, a biography of Ii Naosuke, under the name "Henry Satoh."

Upon graduating from DePauw, he returned to Japan and became a telegraph officer in the Ministry of Foreign Affairs. He then served in Japan's diplomatic missions to the United States, Great Britain, and France before becoming ambassador to Mexico in 1900.

In 1905, Satō participated in the peace conference at Portsmouth, New Hampshire that ended the Russo-Japanese War. The following year, he was appointed Japanese Ambassador to the Netherlands. Satō later served as ambassador to Austria-Hungary during World War I, and barely escaped from the country alive after he was expelled following Japan's declaration of war on Germany (Austria-Hungary's ally).

Satō was then appointed Japanese Ambassador to the United States from 1916 to 1918, replacing his brother-in-law and fellow DePauw alumnus Chinda Sutemi. Satō was recalled from his post when he proved unable to secure a deal for the export of steel plates to Japan. He then retired from the Ministry of Foreign Affairs and took up a post in the Imperial Household Ministry, serving as a privy councillor attached to the household of Prince Fushimi.

Satō died of arteriosclerosis on January 12, 1934, in Tokyo.
