= Pyotr Stolypin's Cabinet =

Cabinet of Pyotr Stolypin
- 3rd Cabinet of Russia

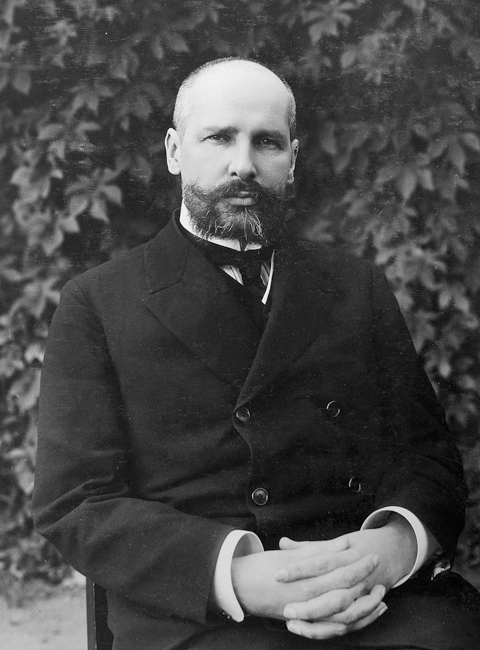
- Date formed: July 21, 1906
- Date dissolved: September 18, 1911

People and organisations
- Head of state: Nicholas II
- Head of government: Pyotr Stolypin
- No. of ministers: 30

History
- Predecessor: Goremykin I
- Successor: Kokovtsov

Cabinet of Pyotr Stolypin – composition of the Council of Ministers of the Russian Empire, under the leadership of Pyotr Stolypin, worked from July 21, 1906 to September 18, 1911.

Stolypin's government has worked until the death of the Prime Minister, as a result of the ensuing attempt in September 1911.

== Formation ==
Immediately after his appointment, Stolypin began talks about the invitation in new cabinet popular public and parliamentary figures belonging to the Constitutional Democratic Party and "Union of October 17". Ministerial positions originally assumed Dmitry Shipov, Georgy Lvov, Peter Heyden, Nikolai Lvov, Alexander Guchkov; in the course of further negotiations also considered candidates Anatoly Koni and Yevgeny Trubetskoy. Public figures, confident that the future 2nd State Duma may force the government to create a cabinet responsible to the Parliament, had little interest in the activities as Ministers of the Crown in a mixed public and bureaucratic office; the possibility of entering the government they are hedged by such terms and conditions, which obviously could not be taken by Stolypin. Eventually, the negotiations failed completely. As this was the third failed attempt to attract public figures in the government (the first attempt was made by Sergei Witte in October 1905, immediately after the publication of the October Manifesto, the second -. By Stolypin in June 1906, before the dissolution of the First State Duma), Stolypin as a result of completely disappointed in the idea of public office and later headed the government purely bureaucratic structure.

On assuming office, the Prime Minister Stolypin insisted on the resignation of the Ministry of Agriculture Aleksandr Stishinsky and Procurator of Alexey Shirinsky-Shikhmatov, while maintaining the rest of the composition of the previous cabinet of Ivan Goremykin.

== Ministers ==
Composition of the cabinet is constantly changing, which was connected with the fact that the ministers did not justify expectations of Stolypin.

| Ministry | Image | Minister | Term |
|---|---|---|---|
| Prime Minister | | Pyotr Stolypin | 21 July 1906 – 18 September 1911 |
| Ministry of Internal Affairs | | Pyotr Stolypin | 21 July 1906 – 18 September 1911 |
| Ministry of Finance | | Vladimir Kokovtsov | 21 July 1906 – 18 September 1911 |
| Ministry of Justice | | Ivan Shcheglovitov | 21 July 1906 – 18 September 1911 |
| Ministry of the Imperial Court | | Vladimir Frederiks | 21 July 1906 – 18 September 1911 |
| Ministry of Foreign Affairs | | Alexander Izvolsky | 21 July 1906 – 11 October 1910 |
| Ministry of Foreign Affairs | | Sergey Sazonov | 11 October 1910 – 18 September 1911 |
| Deputy Minister of Foreign Affairs | | Anatoly Neratov | March – 18 September 1911 |
| Ministry of Railways | | Nikolay Shaufus | 21 July 1906 – 11 February 1909 |
| Ministry of Railways | | Sergey Rukhlov | 11 February 1909 – 18 September 1911 |
| Ministry of War | | Aleksandr Roediger | 21 July 1906 – 24 March 1909 |
| Ministry of War | | Vladimir Sukhomlinov | 24 March 1909 – 18 September 1911 |
| Ministry of National Education | | Peter Kaufman | 21 July 1906 – 14 January 1908 |
| Ministry of National Education | | Alexander Shvarts | 14 January 1908 – 8 October 1910 |
| Ministry of National Education | | Lev Kasso | 8 October 1910 – 18 September 1911 |
| Marine Ministry | | Aleksei Birilev | 21 July 1906 – 24 January 1907 |
| Marine Ministry | | Ivan Dikov | 24 January 1907 – 21 January 1909 |
| Marine Ministry | | Stepan Voyevodsky | 21 January 1909 – 31 March 1911 |
| Marine Ministry | | Ivan Grigorovich | 31 March – 18 September 1911 |
| Deputy Marine Minister | | Ivan Grigorovich | 21 January 1909 – 31 March 1911 |
| Ministry of Trade and Industry | | Aleksandr Shtof | 21 July – 8 August 1906 |
| Ministry of Trade and Industry | | Dmitry Filosofov | 8 August 1906 – 19 December 1907 |
| Ministry of Trade and Industry | | Mikhail Ostrogradskiy | 19 December 1907 – 12 February 1908 (acting) |
| Ministry of Trade and Industry | | Ivan Shipov | 12 February 1908 – 26 January 1909 |
| Ministry of Trade and Industry | | Vasily Timiryazev | 26 January – 18 November 1909 |
| Ministry of Trade and Industry | | Sergey Timashev | 18 November 1909 – 18 September 1911 |
| Ministry of Agriculture | | Boris Vasilchikov | 21 July 1906 – 3 June 1908 |
| Ministry of Agriculture | | Alexander Krivoshein | 3 June 1908 – 18 September 1911 |
| State control | | Peter Schwanebach | 21 July 1906 – 26 June 1907 |
| State control | | Peter Kharitonov | 25 September 1907 – 18 September 1911 |
| Procurator | | Peter Izvolsky | 9 August 1906 – 18 February 1909 |
| Procurator | | Sergey Lukianov | 18 February 1909 – 15 May 1911 |
| Procurator | | Vladimir Sabler | 15 May – 18 September 1911 |
