= Ivan Goremykin's Second Cabinet =

Second Cabinet of Ivan Goremykin
- 5th Cabinet of Russia

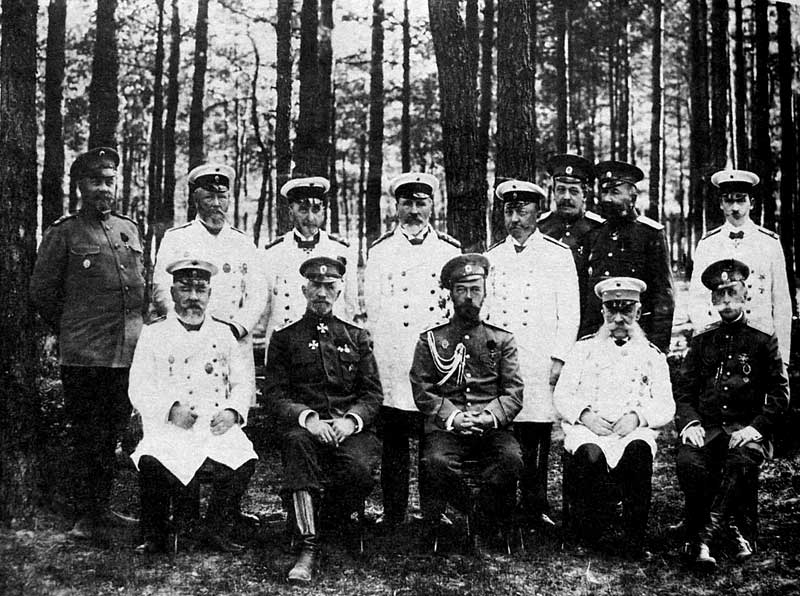
- Date formed: February 12, 1914
- Date dissolved: February 2, 1916

People and organisations
- Head of state: Nicholas II
- Head of government: Ivan Goremykin
- No. of ministers: 20
- Opposition party: Progressive Bloc
- Opposition leader: Pavel Milyukov

History
- Predecessor: Kokovtsov
- Successor: Stürmer

Second Cabinet of Ivan Goremykin – composition of the Council of Ministers of the Russian Empire, under the leadership of Ivan Goremykin, worked from February 12, 1914 to February 2, 1916.

As in the First Cabinet, Goremykin continued to resist the State Duma, in particular the Progressive Bloc, threatening to dissolve parliament. Prime Minister threatened to dissolve Parliament, which is intended to form a "Government of trust", thereby subjecting the Council of Ministers of the State Duma.

February 2, 1916, after repeated requests Ivan Goremykin, Nicholas II sent a government to resign.

== Ministers ==
Ministry	Image	Minister	Term
Prime Minister		Ivan Goremykin	12 February 1914 – 2 February 1916
Ministry of Finance		Pyotr Bark	12 February 1914 – 2 February 1916
Ministry of Foreign Affairs		Sergey Sazonov	12 February 1914 – 2 February 1916
Ministry of Justice		Ivan Shcheglovitov	12 February 1914 – 2 February 1916
Ministry of National Education		Peter Kaufman	12 February 1914 – 2 February 1916
Ministry of the Imperial Court		Vladimir Frederiks	12 February 1914 – 2 February 1916
Marine Ministry		Ivan Grigorovich	12 February 1914 – 2 February 1916
Ministry of Trade and Industry		Vsevolod Shakhovskoy	12 February 1914 – 2 February 1916
State control		Peter Kharitonov	12 February 1914 – 2 February 1916
Ministry of Internal Affairs		Nikolay Maklakov	12 February 1914 – 18 June 1915
Ministry of Internal Affairs		Nikolai Scherbatov	18 June– 9 October 1915
Ministry of Internal Affairs		Alexei Khvostov	9 October 1915 – 2 February 1916
Ministry of War		Vladimir Sukhomlinov	12 February 1914 – 24 June 1915
Ministry of War		Alexei Polivanov	24 June 1915 – 2 February 1916
Ministry of Railways		Sergey Rukhlov	12 February 1914 – 12 November 1915
Ministry of Railways		Alexander Trepov	12 November 1915 – 2 February 1916
Ministry of Agriculture		Alexander Krivoshein	12 February 1914 – 8 November 1915
Ministry of Agriculture		Aleksandr Naumov	8 November 1915 – 2 February 1916
Procurator		Vladimir Sabler	12 February 1914 – 17 July 1915
Procurator		Alexander Samarin	17 July– 9 October 1915
Procurator		Alexander Volzhin	9 October 1915– 2 February 1916
