= Ivan Goremykin's First Cabinet =

Russian government body in 1906

First cabinet of Ivan Goremykin
- 2nd Cabinet of Russia

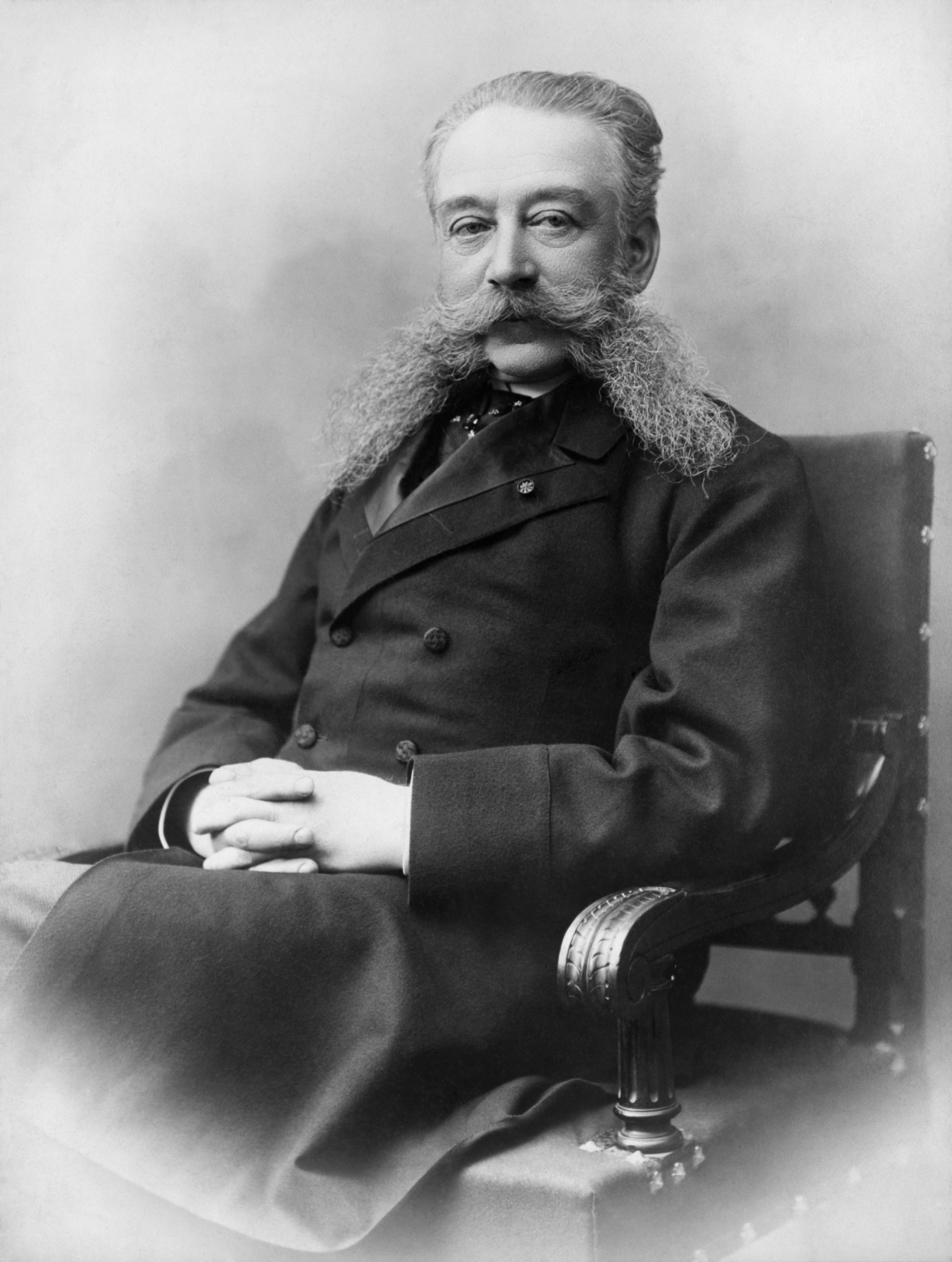
- Date formed: 5 May [O.S. 22 April] 1906
- Date dissolved: 21 July [O.S. 8 July] 1906

People and organisations
- Head of state: Nicholas II
- Head of government: Ivan Goremykin
- No. of ministers: 13
- Opposition party: Constitutional Democratic Party; Socialist Revolutionary Party; Trudoviks
- Opposition leader: Sergey Muromtsev

History
- Predecessor: Witte
- Successor: Stolypin

First Cabinet of Ivan Goremykin was a composition of the Council of Ministers of the Russian Empire, under the leadership of Ivan Goremykin, in office from May 5, 1906 to July 21, 1906.

From the very beginning of its work, the Cabinet of Goremykin conflict with the State Duma, which tried to subjugate the government. For 72 days, the State Duma adopted a 391 request for the illegal actions of the government.

July 19, 1906, the State Duma was dissolved and on July 21 the government was dismissed.

== Ministers ==
Ministry	Image	Minister	Term
Prime Minister		Ivan Goremykin	5 May – 21 July 1906
Ministry of Internal Affairs		Pyotr Stolypin	5 May – 21 July 1906
Ministry of Finance		Vladimir Kokovtsov	5 May – 21 July 1906
Ministry of Foreign Affairs		Alexander Izvolsky	5 May – 21 July 1906
Ministry of Railways		Nikolay Shaufus	5 May – 21 July 1906
Ministry of Justice		Ivan Shcheglovitov	5 May – 21 July 1906
Ministry of War		Aleksandr Roediger	5 May – 21 July 1906
Ministry of National Education		Peter Kaufman	5 May – 21 July 1906
Ministry of the Imperial Court		Vladimir Frederiks	5 May – 21 July 1906
Marine Ministry		Aleksei Birilev	5 May – 21 July 1906
Ministry of Trade and Industry		Alexander Shtof	5 May – 21 July 1906
Ministry of Agriculture		Aleksandr Stishinsky	5 May – 21 July 1906
State Сontroller		Peter Schwanebach	5 May – 21 July 1906
Procurator		Alexey Shirinsky-Shikhmatov	5 May – 21 July 1906
