= Vladimir Kokovtsov's Cabinet =

Cabinet of Vladimir Kokovtsov
- 4th Cabinet of Russia

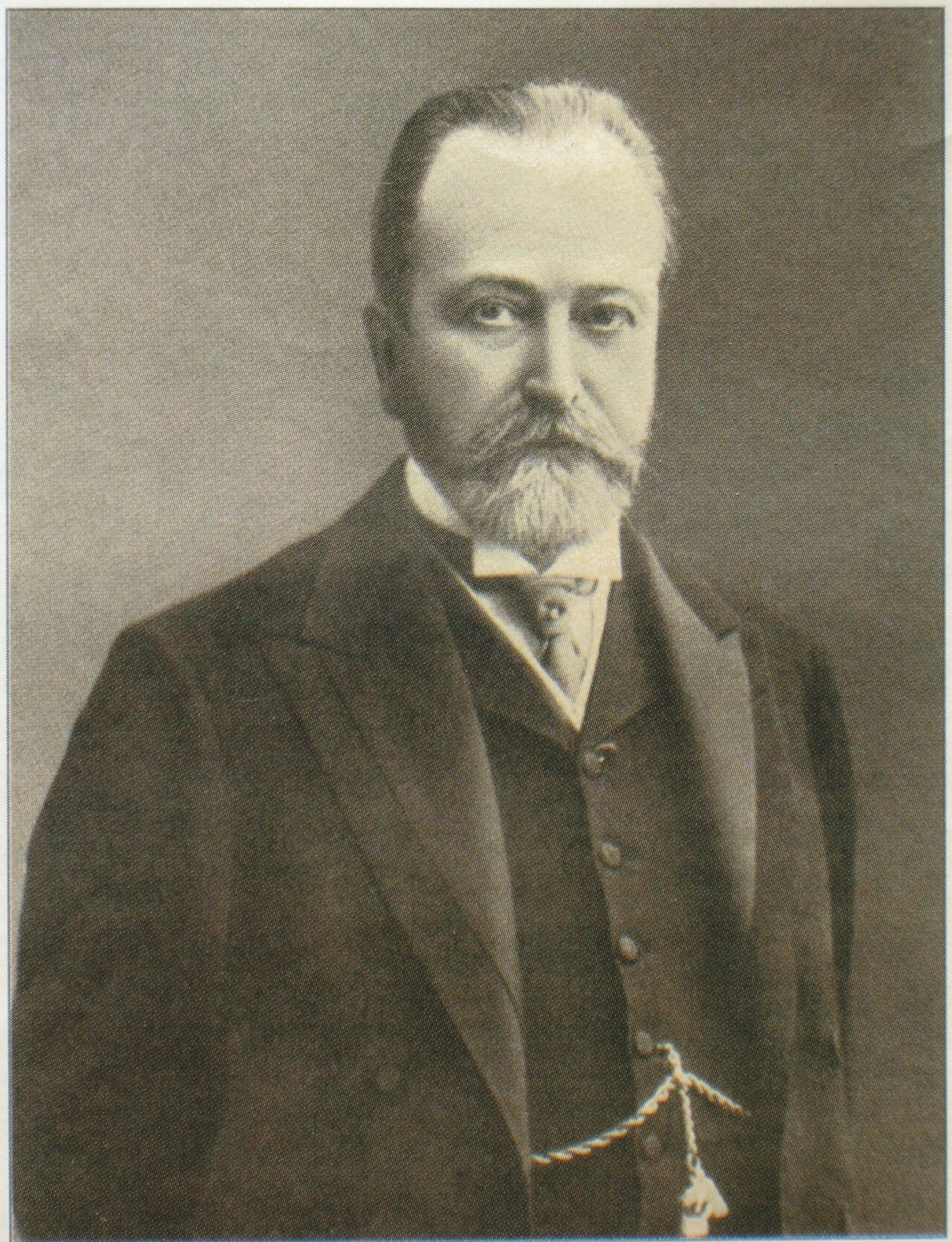
- Date formed: September 22, 1911
- Date dissolved: February 12, 1914

People and organisations
- Head of state: Nicholas II
- Head of government: Vladimir Kokovtsov
- No. of ministers: 12

History
- Predecessor: Stolypin
- Successor: Goremykin II

Cabinet of Vladimir Kokovtsov – composition of the Council of Ministers of the Russian Empire, under the leadership of Vladimir Kokovtsov, worked from September 22, 1911 to February 12, 1914.

Kokovtsov's Cabinet was formed immediately after the murder of Pyotr Stolypin, who served as Prime Minister. Emperor Nicholas II decided to appoint a new Prime Minister Vladimir Kokovtsov, who was Finance Minister in the Cabinet of Stolypin and retained this post in his Cabinet.

== Ministers ==
Ministry	Image	Minister	Term
Prime Minister and Minister of Finance		Vladimir Kokovtsov	22 September 1911 – 12 February 1914
Minister of Internal Affairs		Alexander Makarov	22 September 1911 – 29 December 1912
Minister of Internal Affairs		Nikolay Maklakov	29 December 1912 – 6 March 1913 (acting)
Minister of Internal Affairs		Nikolay Maklakov	6 March 1913 – 12 February 1914
Minister of Foreign Affairs		Sergey Sazonov	22 September 1911 – 12 February 1914
Minister of Railways		Sergey Rukhlov	22 September 1911 – 12 February 1914
Minister of Justice		Ivan Shcheglovitov	22 September 1911 – 12 February 1914
Minister of National Education		Pavel Ignatieff	22 September 1911 – 12 February 1914
Marine Minister		Ivan Grigorovich	22 September 1911 – 12 February 1914
Minister of War		Vladimir Sukhomlinov	22 September 1911 – 12 February 1914
Minister of Trade and Industry		Sergey Timashev	22 September 1911 – 12 February 1914
Minister of Agriculture		Alexander Krivoshein	22 September 1911 – 12 February 1914
State Controller		Peter Kharitonov	22 September 1911 – 12 February 1914
Procurator		Vladimir Sabler	22 September 1911 – 12 February 1914
