= Sergei Witte's Cabinet =

Cabinet of Sergei Witte
- 1st Cabinet of Russia

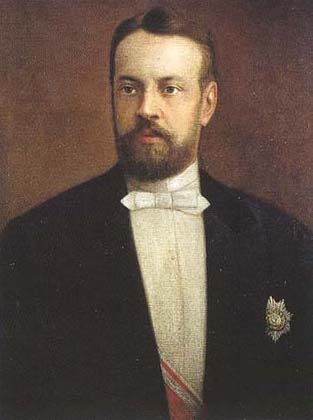
- Date formed: November 6, 1905
- Date dissolved: May 5, 1906

People and organisations
- Head of state: Nicholas II
- Head of government: Count Sergei Witte
- No. of ministers: 13

History
- Successor: Goremykin I

Cabinet of Sergei Witte was the Council of Ministers of the Russian Empire, under the leadership of Sergei Witte, worked from November 6, 1905, to May 5, 1906.

Cabinet of Sergei Witte was the first Cabinet in Russian history. Despite his short work during this period has been done so many important affairs of state, created by the State Duma.

The first step of Sergei Witte as Prime Minister was the invitation to his dacha on Stone island editors of all the major St. Petersburg Newspapers, to the media to announce the creation of a coalition Cabinet. However, the venture he did not. The editors said Mr. Witte that "don't trust the government" and demanded the withdrawal of troops from Petersburg.

As a result, the Witt has not received love and recognition from the liberal part of Russian society, nor the circle of the king. After five months on the post of the Chairman of the Council of Ministers Witte asked for king's resignation. Nicholas II easily took her in.

== Ministers ==
Ministry	Image	Minister	Term
Prime Minister		Sergei Witte	6 November 1905 – 5 May 1906
Ministry of Internal Affairs		Pyotr Durnovo	6 November 1905 – 5 May 1906
Ministry of Finance		Ivan Shipov	6 November 1905 – 5 May 1906
Ministry of Foreign Affairs		Vladimir Lamsdorf	6 November 1905 – 5 May 1906
Ministry of Railways		Clavdy Nemeshayev	6 November 1905 – 5 May 1906
Ministry of War		Aleksandr Roediger	6 November 1905 – 5 May 1906
Ministry of National Education		Ivan Tolstoy	6 November 1905 – 5 May 1906
Ministry of the Imperial Court		Vladimir Frederiks	6 November 1905 – 5 May 1906
Marine Ministry		Aleksei Birilev	6 November 1905 – 5 May 1906
State control		Dmitry Filosofov	6 November 1905 – 5 May 1906
Procurator		Alexey Obolensky	6 November 1905 – 5 May 1906
Ministry of Justice		Sergey Manukhin	6 November – 29 December 1905
Ministry of Justice		Mikhail Akimov	29 December 1905 – 5 May 1906
Ministry of Trade and Industry		Vasily Timiryazev	6 November 1905 – 18 February 1906
Ministry of Trade and Industry		Mikhail Fedorov	18 February – 5 May 1906
Ministry of Agriculture		Peter Schwanebach	6–8 November 1905
Ministry of Agriculture		Nikolai Kutler	8 November 1905 – 18 February 1906
Ministry of Agriculture		Alexander Nikolsky	12 March – 5 May 1906
