= Boris Vasilchikov =

- Бори́с Алекса́ндрович Васи́льчиков
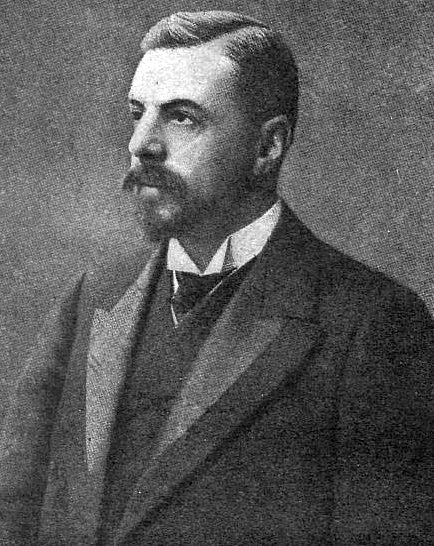
- Vasilchikov in 1915

Governor of Pskov
- In office June 7, 1900 – June 13, 1903
- Preceded by: Konstantin Ivanovich Pashchenko
- Succeeded by: Aleksandr Adlerberg

Member of the State Council
- In office April 2, 1906 – May 1, 1917

Prince Boris Aleksandrovich Vasilchikov (Russian: Бори́с Алекса́ндрович Васи́льчиков; 1863, Vybiti, Novgorod Governorate – 1931, Menton) — Russian politician.

== Biography ==
Graduated from the Imperial School of Law; entered the Ministry of Justice, 1881.

Elected Marshal of Nobility of Staraia Russa Uezd, 1884, of Novgorod Guberniya (1890).

Governor of Pskov (1900–1903); Head of the Red Cross for the Northeastern District during the Russo-Japanese War. Chairman of the Russian Red Cross Society.

Member of the State Council (1906). Head of the Chief Administration of Land Organization and Agriculture in the Pyotr Stolypin cabinet (July 1906 – May 1908).

Emigrated to France in 1920 from the USSR after the 1917 Revolution.

== Sources ==
- V.I. Gurko. Features And Figures Of The Past. Government And Opinion In The Reign Of Nicholas II.

Preceded by Aleksandr Stishinsky	Minister of agriculture of Russia; 27 July 1906 – 21 May 1908	Succeeded by Alexander Krivoshein
