= Theodor Avellan =

Russian admiral (1839–1916)

Theodor Kristian Avellan
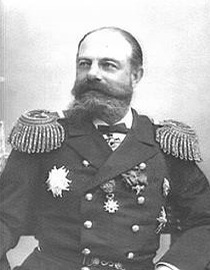
- Avellan in 1904
- Born: September 12, 1839; Loviisa, Grand Duchy of Finland, Russian Empire
- Died: September 30, 1916 (aged 77); Petrograd, Russia
- Military career
- Allegiance: Russia
- Branch: Imperial Russian Navy
- Service years: 1855–1905
- Rank: Admiral
- Conflicts: Russo Japanese War

12th Minister of the Navy of the Russian Empire
- In office 23 March 1903 – 12 July 1905
- Monarch: Nicholas II
- Chairman of the Committee of Ministers: Ivan Durnovo; Sergei Witte
- Preceded by: Pavel Tyrtov
- Succeeded by: Aleksei Birilev

Theodor Kristian Avellan (Russian: Фёдор Ка́рлович Авела́н, romanized: Fyodor Karlovich Avelan; 12 September 1839 – 30 September 1916) was a Finland-Swedish admiral in the Imperial Russian Navy, noted for his role in the Russo-Japanese War of 1904–1905. Although castigated by the Russian government for the defeat of Russia in that war, he subsequently served on the Board of Admiralty and was member of the State Council (1914).

== Biography ==
Avellan was born in Loviisa in the Grand Duchy of Finland. He graduated from the Sea Cadets Corps in 1855, and was promoted to lieutenant in 1857, and was assigned to the Baltic Fleet, and was promoted to lieutenant in 1872. In 1878, he took part in a naval expedition to the coasts of North America and was subsequently given command of the cruiser Asia. Between 1879 and 1889 he made two world tours, commanding a number of different vessels. In 1889 he was promoted to Chief-of-Staff of Kronstadt naval base. He was promoted to rear admiral in 1891. From 1893 to 1894, Avellan commanded the Russian squadron in the Mediterranean, and visited the French Navy in Toulon (October 1893) to reinforce the Franco-Russian Alliance. From 1895 to 1897 he served as Deputy Chief-of-Staff of the Imperial Russian Navy. He then became Chief-of-Staff and was raised in rank the Adjutant-General in 1903. He served as Minister of the Navy from 10 March 1903 to 29 June 1905. Following the massive defeat of the Imperial Russian Navy at the Battle of Tsushima, he was held responsible for the disaster due to his underestimation of the Japanese and was stripped of his rank. Although he presented his resignation to Tsar Nicholas II, his resignation was rejected. In 1914, he was allowed to have a seat in the Council of State. He died on 30 September 1916 in Petrograd.

== Decorations ==
- 1869 : Order of St. Stanislaus 3rd degree
- 1872: Order of St. Anne 3rd degree
- 1875 : Order of Saints Maurice and Lazarus, 4th class (Italy)
- 1875: Order of St Vladimir 4th degree
- 1876 : Order of St. Stanislaus 3rd degree
- 1879: Order of St. Anne 2nd degree
- 1883 : Royal Order of Kapiolani, Commanders Cross (Hawaii)
- 1884 : Order of the Redeemer, 2nd class (Greece)
- 1890 : Order of St Vladimir 3rd degree
- 1891 : Legion of Honor, Commanders Cross, (France)
- 1893 : Legion of Honor, 2nd class, (France)
- 1894 : Order of the Medjidie, 2nd class, (Ottoman Empire)
- 1896: Order of St. Anne 1st degree
- 1897 : Order of the Redeemer, Grand Cross (Greece)
- 1897 : Order of the Dannebrog, Knight Commander 2nd class (Denmark)
- 1899 : Order of St Vladimir 2nd degree
- 1891 : Order of St. Stanislaus 1st degree
- 1897 : Order of Franz Joseph, Grand Cross (Austria-Hungary)
- 1897 : Order of the Crown, 1st class (Prussia)
- 1897 : Order of the Crown of Siam, 1st class (Siam)
- 1898 : Order of St Alexander 1st Class (Bulgaria)
- 1899 : Knight Grand Cross Order of the Star of Romania, 1st class (Romania)
- 1900 : Order of the Rising Sun, 1st class (Japan)
- 1900 : Order of St Vladimir 1st degree
- 1902 : Order of Saints Maurice and Lazarus, 1st class (Italy)
- 1902 : Order of the White Eagle
- 1902 : Order of the Red Eagle, 1st class (Prussia)
- 1902 : Order of the Sword, 1st class (Sweden)
- 1907 : Order of St. Alexander Nevsky
- 1912 : Order of St. Alexander Nevsky, with diamonds
- 1916: Order of St Vladimir 1st degree

== Sources ==
- "Авелан, Федор Карлович" . Brockhaus and Efron Encyclopedic Dictionary (in Russian). 1906.
- Connaughton, R.M (1988). The War of the Rising Sun and the Tumbling Bear—A Military History of the Russo-Japanese War 1904–5, London, ISBN 0-415-00906-5.
- Kowner, Rotem (2006). Historical Dictionary of the Russo-Japanese War. The Scarecrow Press. ISBN 0-8108-4927-5.
- Warner, Denis & Peggy. The Tide at Sunrise, A History of the Russo-Japanese War 1904–1905. (1975). ISBN 0-7146-5256-3.
