= Aleksei Birilev =

Russian admiral (1844–1915)

Aleksei Alekseyevich Birelev
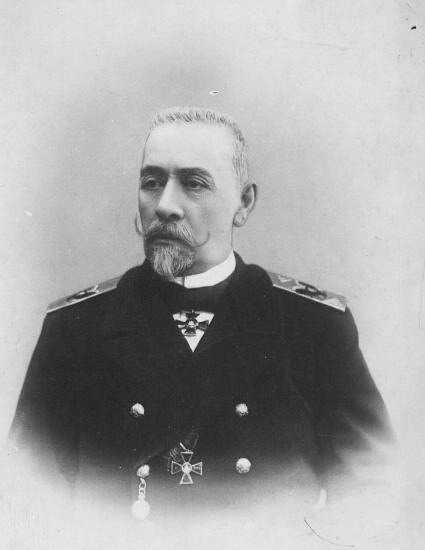
- Alexei Birilev as Kontr Admiral (Rear Admiral)
- Born: March 16, 1844 near Tver, Russian Empire
- Died: February 16, 1915 (aged 70); Petrograd, Russian Empire
- Military career
- Allegiance: Russian Empire
- Branch: Imperial Russian Navy
- Service years: 1859–1907
- Rank: Admiral
- Commands: Baltic Fleet; Russian Pacific Fleet
- Conflicts: Russo-Japanese War

13th Minister of the Navy of the Russian Empire
- In office 12 July 1905 – 24 January 1907
- Monarch: Nicholas II
- Prime Minister: Sergei Witte; Ivan Goremykin; Piotr Stolypin
- Chairman of the Committee of Ministers: Sergei Witte
- Preceded by: Theodor Avellan
- Succeeded by: Ivan Dikov

Aleksei Alekseyevich Birelev (Russian: Алексей Алексеевич Бирилёв) (16 March 1844 – 6 February 1915) was an admiral in the Imperial Russian Navy, a member of the State Council and Minister of the Navy in the Imperial Government.

== Biography ==
Birilev was born into a family of relatively poor Russian nobility, without an estate. He entered the Imperial Russian Navy in 1859 as a cabin boy, graduating from the Sea Cadet Corps in 1862 and was commissioned as a lieutenant in 1868. He made two trips around the world, from 1859 to 1865 and from 1869 to 1872.

Between 1880 and 1894 he commanded the frigate Admiral Lazarev, cruiser Lieutenant Ilyin (1886-1887), cruiser Plastun (1888), armoured cruiser Minin (1890-1892), coastal battleship Admiral Ushakov (1893) and Gangut (1893-1894). Birilev was promoted to rear admiral in 1894 and commanded the ordnance department of the Russian Navy.

From 1900 to 1904, he commanded the Mediterranean squadron of the Russian Navy becoming vice admiral in 1901. In February 1904 he was appointed commander of the Baltic Fleet and military governor of Kronstadt. In May 1905 he was appointed commander of the Pacific Fleet, and departed for Vladivostok where he was intended to assume command of the Second Pacific Squadron from Admiral Zinovy Rozhestvensky on its arrival. However, he heard of the defeat at the Battle of Tsushima while still traveling on the Trans-Siberian Railway, and immediately sent a telegram to Tsar Nicholas II asking to be relieved of the command. He returned to Saint Petersburg after only two months in Vladivostok.

In July 1905 he replaced Fyodor Avelan as Navy Minister, holding this position until January 1907. He made efforts to rebuild the Imperial Russian Navy, but with limited success. From November 1905, he was also a member of the State Council. He chaired the Admiralty Council and was on the National Defence Council. He was also one of the signatories to the secret Treaty of Björkö between Russia and Germany. He was promoted to Admiral in July 1907. At the beginning of World War I, he started a charity to assist the injured and the families of sailors. He died in 1915.

== Awards ==
- Order of St Vladimir 4th degree
- Order of St Vladimir 3rd degree
- Order of St Vladimir 2nd degree
- Order of St. Anne 3rd degree
- Order of St. Anne 2nd degree
- Order of St. Anne 1st degree
- Order of St. Stanislaus 3rd degree
- Order of St. Stanislaus 2nd degree
- Order of St. Stanislaus 1st degree
- Order of the White Eagle
- Order of St. Alexander Nevsky

Foreign orders and decorations

- Ottoman Empire: Grand Cordon, Order of Medjidie, 23 February 1900, during and audience with the Sultan in Constantinople.
