= Ivan Grigorovich =

Russian admiral and politician (1853–1930)

Ivan Konstantinovich Grigorovich
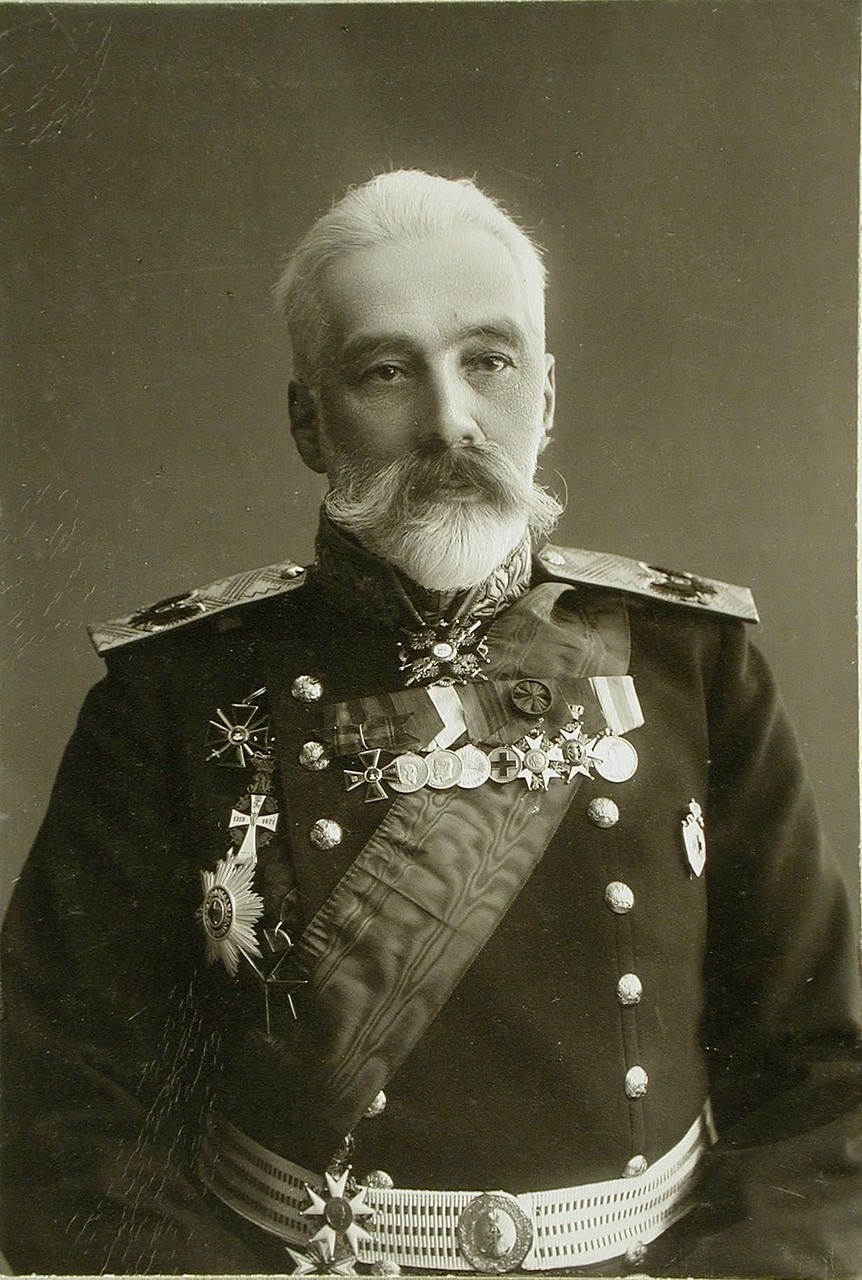
- Photograph, 1908
- Born: 26 January 1853; Saint Petersburg, Saint Petersburg Governorate, Russia
- Died: 3 March 1930 (aged 77); Menton, France
- Military career
- Allegiance: Russian Empire
- Branch: Imperial Russian Navy
- Service years: 1880-1915
- Rank: Admiral
- Commands: Baltic Fleet
- Conflicts: Russo-Japanese War; World War I
- Awards: Order of Saint Anna; Order of Saint Vladimir; Order of Saint Stanislaus

16th Minister of the Navy of the Russian Empire
- In office 1 April 1911 – 13 March 1917
- Monarch: Nicholas II
- Prime Minister: Piotr Stolypin; Vladimir Kokovtsov; Ivan Goremykin; Boris Shturmer; Alexander Trepov; Nikolai Golitsyn
- Preceded by: Stepan Voevodskiy
- Succeeded by: Alexander Guchkov (as Minister of War and Navy of the Russian Provisional Government)

Deputy Minister of the Navy of the Russian Empire
- In office 21 January 1909 – 1 April 1911
- Monarch: Nicholas II
- Prime Minister: Piotr Stolypin
- Minister of the Navy: Stepan Voevodskiy

12th Commander-in-Chief of the Black Sea Fleet
- In office 1905–1906
- Monarch: Nicholas II
- Prime Minister: Sergei Witte
- Minister of the Navy: Aleksei Brusilov
- Preceded by: Grigoriy Pavlovich Chukhnin
- Succeeded by: Nikolai Skrydlov

Ivan Konstantinovich Grigorovich (Russian: Иван Константинович Григорович) (26 January 1853 – 3 March 1930) served as Imperial Russia's last Naval Minister from 1911 until the onset of the 1917 revolution.

== Early career ==
Grigorovich was from a Russian noble family and opted for a military career after the death of his father, Konstantin Ivanovich Grigorovich. Graduating from the Sea Cadet Corps in 1874 Grigorovich served as an officer on various ships. In 1893, he was promoted to captain, 1st rank. In 1896 to 1898 he was appointed Russian naval attaché in London. In 1899 he was appointed to command the battleship Tsesarevich, which was being completed in France. In 1903 Tsesarevich sailed to Port Arthur.

During the surprise Japanese torpedo boat attack on Port Arthur, starting the Russo-Japanese War, Tsesarevich was hit by a Japanese torpedo but remained afloat and contributed to driving off the Japanese attack. Grigorovich was awarded the Order of St Vladimir, 3rd class with swords for his role in the battle. After the death of Admiral Stepan Makarov, he was promoted to rear admiral and appointed chief of Port Arthur's port. Under his effective management, the Russian Pacific squadron had no shortage of coal, munitions or any supplies during the Siege of Port Arthur. In 1904 he was also awarded the Order of Saint Stanislaus, 1st class.

== As admiral ==
After the end of the war, Grigorovich was appointed chief of staff of the Black Sea Fleet. He was appointed commander of the naval base at Libau in 1908 awarded the Order of St Anna, 1st class, and became commander of the naval base at Kronstadt in 1909. In 1909 he was appointed Deputy Navy Minister and promoted to admiral in 1911. From 1911 until the onset of revolution in 1917 he served as Russia's Naval Minister, overseeing a huge rearmament programme. The naval build-up included building four Gangut-class battleships for the Baltic Fleet and four Imperatritsa Mariya-class battleships for the Black Sea Fleet. He personally visited the shipyards and the different fleets of Imperial Russia to supervise the progress of the construction of warships, and the training of crew and sailors. He enjoyed good relationships with the Duma and used his popularity to secure huge extra funds to expand the navy. He remained in charge of the Imperial Russian Navy through most of World War I. He was chairman of the Admiralty Board from 1911 to 1915, and was a member of the State Council from 1913 to 1917.

Grigorovich was politically sympathetic to the Octobrist Party and was nominated as a candidate for Prime Minister in 1916; however, his candidacy was rejected due to objections from dowager tsarina Maria Feodorovna over Grigorovich's liberal views.

== Post-Revolution ==
Grigorovich was dismissed from office in the wake of the February Revolution on 31 March 1917. He served on the Historical Commission and was asked to write his memoirs (which were only published in 1993, after the fall of the Soviet Union). However, he was dismissed in October 1921 due to downsizing, and lived in extreme poverty, suffering frequently from pneumonia and for some time lived in the apartment of Aleksey Krylov. From his retirement, he asked for permission to get medical treatment abroad, and left for France in the autumn of 1924. He lived in exile in France in poverty until his death in 1930, with an income by selling his own oil paintings of seascapes. On his death, he was initially buried in the Russian Cemetery in Menton. In 2005 the urn containing his ashes was taken aboard the cruiser Moskva, which carried his remains to Novorossiysk. The ashes were then flown to Saint Petersburg and buried in his family vault in the Alexander Nevsky Lavra in accordance with his will.

The Russian Navy has named the first of the Admiral Grigorovich-class frigates after Ivan Grigorovich.

He was awarded Order of Prince Danilo I, Order of the Cross of Takovo and a number of other decorations.
