= Aleksandr Stishinsky =

Russian politician (1851–1920)

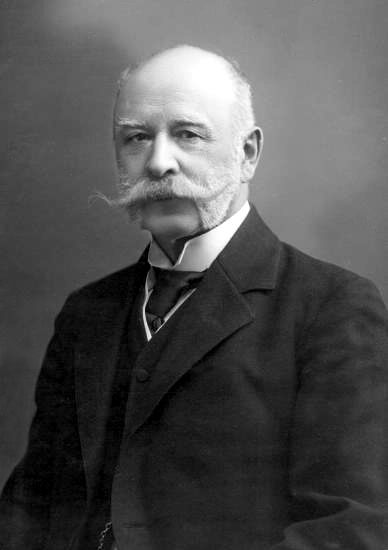

Aleksandr Semenovich Stishinsky (Russian: Алекса́ндр Семёнович Стиши́нский; June 18, 1851, Tiflis – December 29, 1920, Constantinople) was a Russian statesman and nationalist politician.

== Biography ==
Graduate of Moscow University (1872). Worked in the Department for General Affairs of the Ministry of the Interior; transferred to the Imperial Chancellery (1873); Assistant State Secretary (1882–1886), then again transferred to the Ministry of the Interior; Head of the Peasant Section (1893); Assistant Imperial Secretary (1896–1899). Assistant Minister of the Interior (1900–1904). Member of State Council (1904), belonged to its right-wing group.

Head of the Chief Administration of Land Organization and Agriculture in the Goremykin cabinet (April — June 1906).

Chairman of the Committee to Fight German Domination [in Russia] (1916).

He was arrested during the February Revolution and imprisoned for 9 months in Peter and Paul Fortress. Released in December 1917, he fled to Poltava, then to Kuban. He died in Constantinople in 1920.

== Sources ==
- V.I. Gurko. Features And Figures Of The Past. Government And Opinion In The Reign Of Nicholas II.
