= Sergey Rukhlov =

Russian politician (1853–1918)

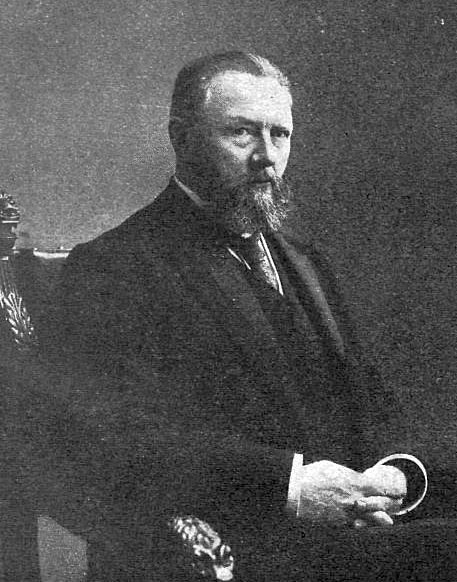
Sergei Rukhlov.

Sergei Vasilevich Rukhlov (Russian: Серге́й Васи́льевич Ру́хлов; 1853–1918) was a conservative member of the Russian State Council and one of the founders of the All-Russian National Union, a nationalist organisation. A graduate of St. Petersburg University, he was Minister of Communications from 1909 to 1915.
