= Alexander Krivoshein =

Russian lawyer and politician

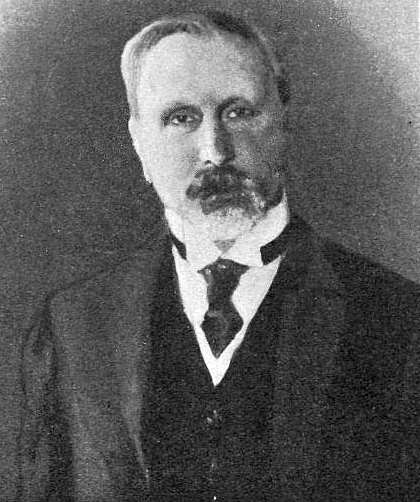
Alexander Krivoshein (1915).

Alexander Vasilyevich Krivoshein (Russian: Алекса́ндр Васи́льевич Кривоше́ин; July 31 [O.S. July 19], 1857, Warsaw – October 28, 1921, Berlin) was a Russian monarchist politician and minister of agriculture under Pyotr Stolypin.

== Life ==
He graduated in law from St. Petersburg University. Worked in the Ministry of Justice and later in the Ministry of the Interior (1884–1896). Assistant head of the Department of Peasant Colonization (1896–1904), and head (1904–1905). Assistant head of the Chief Administration of Land Organization and Agriculture (1905–1906). Member of the State Council (1906). Assistant minister of finance (1906–1908).

Krivoshein served as Russia's minister of agriculture between 1908 and 1915. He was one of the few ministers, who was respected by the emperor and government circles, as well as the educated public. Most of the commissioners appointed by him were members of the public, rather than administrators or businesspersons. Krivoshein was one of the principal ministers involved in the implementation of the Stolypin agrarian reforms. He supported large private capital in industry, because he believed that the private investment would free up more state funds for agriculture. However, for agriculture, he favored the individual peasant and the noble landowner. During the ministerial debates in 1913–14, his ministry did not oppose the expansion of joint-stock companies in the industry, but fought to limit their role in the land purchases. His ministry also imposed a ban on Jews holding managerial positions in stock companies involved in the land purchases.

In 1915, Krivoshein headed the "Special Council for Discussion and Coordinating Measures for Food Supply". He was a moderate politician, and tried to persuade Nikolai Maklakov (the minister of the interior) to take more account of the Imperial Duma in determining policy. He supported the moderate parliamentary reform in 1915. He was one of several ministers to be dismissed for opposing Nicholas II's decision to take command of the Russian Army. Krivoshein rejected the February Revolution of 1917. After the October Revolution of 1917, he joined the anti-Bolshevik White Army in Crimea. He tried to save the Russian emperor, when the latter was moved from Tomsk to Yekaterinburg, organizing an anti-Bolshevik conspiracy in Moscow, and barely escaping arrest. He also served as the head of General Wrangel's government in Crimea.

Later, he went into exile in France. His son, Igor A. Krivoshein, was an engineer and high-ranking Freemason in France.

Preceded by Nikolay Melnikov	Head of the South Russian Government; June 1920 — November 1920	Succeeded by Position abolished
Preceded by Boris Vasilchikov	Minister of agriculture of Russia; 21 May 1908 — 26 October 1915	Succeeded by Aleksandr Naumov
