= Ministry of the Imperial Court =

Former ministry in Russian Empire

- Russian: Министерство императорского двора
- Coat of arms of the Russian Empire

Ministry overview
- Formed: 3 September [O.S. 22 August] 1826
- Dissolved: 1918
- Jurisdiction: Emperor of Russia
- Headquarters: Russian Empire, Saint Petersburg
- Minister responsible: Woldemar Freedericksz

The Ministry of the Imperial Court (Russian: Министерство императорского двора) was established in the Russian Empire in 1826, and embraced in one institution all the former separate branches of the Court administration.

The Ministry of the Court was under the personal cognizance of Emperor of Russia, and therefore, rendered account of all its affairs to the Emperor alone. After the February Revolution of 1917, the Ministry was abolished.

== Structure ==
- Minister of the Court
- Assistant minister
- Ministerial council
- General sections
  - Cabinet of His Imperial Majesty
    - Altay and Nerchinsk Metallurgical works (silver and gold mines)
    - Imperial Porcelain Factory
    - Ekaterinburg granite works
    - Principality of Łowicz in the Kingdom of Poland
  - Chancery of the Minister
  - Control
  - Cash department
  - Medical inspection
  - General Archives
- Special sections
  - Section of the Marshal of the Court, for the provisioning of the Imperial Court and the arrangement of receptions.
  - Expedition of Ceremonies
  - Chancery of HIM the Empress
  - The clergy of the Court under the direction of the Protopresbyter of the Cathedral of the Imperial Winter Palace and the Cathedral of the Annunciation in Moscow
  - The private library of His Imperial Majesty
  - The Imperial Hermitage and its Museum of Arts
  - The Imperial Academy of Arts
  - The Imperial Archaeological Commission, which supervised all archaeological research in Russia.
  - Direction of the Imperial Theatres in St. Petersburg and Moscow
  - The Court choristers
  - The Imperial band of Musicians
  - The Imperial Stables
  - The Imperial Hunt
  - The electrotechnical section, superintending the lighting of the palaces etc.
  - Company of Court Grenadiers - instituted for distinguishing and rewarding meritorious soldiers. These grenadiers performed sentinel duty at certain monuments and in the palaces etc.
- Chapter of Imperial and Royal Orders
- Chief department of Appanages

== List of ministers ==
- Pyotr Mikhailovich Volkonsky (22 August 1826 – 27 August 1852)
- Vladimir Fyodorovich Adlerberg (30 August 1852 – 17 April 1870)
- Alexander Vladimirovich Adlerberg (17 April 1870 – 17 August 1881)
- Eduard Trofimovich Baranov (temporary manager in 1871 and in 1874)
- Illarion Vorontsov-Dashkov (17 August 1881 – 6 May 1897)
- Woldemar Freedericksz (6 May 1897 – 28 February 1917)

== See also ==
- Royal Households of the United Kingdom
- Maison du Roi (France)
- Royal Household and Heritage of the Crown of Spain
- Ministry of the Imperial Household (Japan)
- Ministry of the Royal Court (Persia / Iran)

== Sources ==
- Statesman's handbook for Russia. 1896.
- Saint Petersburg Encyclopedia
