= Pyotr Stolypin =

Prime Minister of the Russian Empire from 1906 to 1911

- Пётр Столыпин
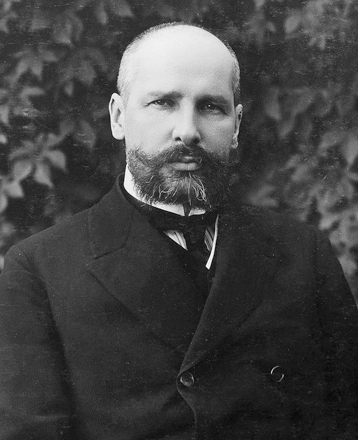
- Stolypin in the 1900s

3rd Prime Minister of Russia
- In office 21 July 1906 – 18 September 1911
- Monarch: Nicholas II
- Preceded by: Ivan Goremykin
- Succeeded by: Vladimir Kokovtsov

Minister of Internal Affairs of Russia
- In office 26 April 1906 – 18 September 1911
- Prime Minister: Ivan Goremykin; Himself
- Preceded by: Pyotr Durnovo
- Succeeded by: Alexander Makarov

Personal details
- Born: Pyotr Arkadyevich Stolypin; 14 April 1862 Dresden, Kingdom of Saxony, German Confederation
- Died: 18 September 1911 (aged 49) Kiev, Kiev Governorate, Southwestern Krai, Russian Empire
- Cause of death: Assassination
- Resting place: Kyiv Pechersk Lavra, Ukraine
- Spouse: Olga Borisovna von Neidhardt

Pyotr Arkadyevich Stolypin (Russian: Пётр Арка́дьевич Столы́пин, IPA: [pʲɵtr ɐrˈkadʲjɪvʲɪtɕ stɐˈlɨpʲɪn]; 14 April [O.S. 2 April] 1862 – 18 September [O.S. 5 September] 1911) was a Russian statesman who served as the third prime minister and the interior minister of the Russian Empire from 1906 until his assassination in 1911. Known as a reformer of Russian society and the economy, he initiated reforms which were halted by his assassination.

Born in Dresden, in the Kingdom of Saxony, to a prominent Russian aristocratic family, Stolypin became involved in government from his early 20s. His successes in public service led to rapid promotions, culminating in his appointment as interior minister under prime minister Ivan Goremykin in April 1906. In July, Goremykin resigned and was succeeded as prime minister by Stolypin.

As prime minister, Stolypin initiated major agrarian reforms, known as the Stolypin reform, that granted the right of private land ownership to the peasantry. His tenure was also marked by increased revolutionary unrest, to which he responded with a new system of martial law that allowed for the arrest, speedy trial, and execution of accused offenders. After numerous assassination attempts, Stolypin was fatally shot in September 1911 by revolutionary Dmitrii Bogrov in Kiev.

Stolypin was a monarchist and hoped to strengthen the throne by modernizing the rural Russian economy. Modernity and efficiency, rather than democracy, were his goals. He argued that the land question could be resolved and revolution averted only when the peasant commune was abolished and a stable landowning class of peasants, the kulaks, had a stake in the status quo. His successes and failures have been the subject of controversy among scholars, who agree that he was one of the last major statesmen of Imperial Russia with cogent and forceful public reform policies.

== Early life and career ==
Stolypin was born at Dresden in the Kingdom of Saxony, on 14 April 1862, and was baptized on 24 May in the Russian Orthodox Church in that city. His father, Arkady Dmitrievich Stolypin (1821–99), was a Russian envoy at the time.

Stolypin's family was prominent in the Russian aristocracy, his forebears having served the tsars since the 16th century, and as a reward for their service had accumulated huge estates in several provinces. His father was a general in the Russian artillery, the governor of Eastern Rumelia and commandant of the Kremlin Palace guard. He was married twice. His second wife, Natalia Mikhailovna Stolypina (née Gorchakova; 1827–89), was the daughter of Prince Mikhail Dmitrievich Gorchakov, the Commanding general of the Russian infantry during the Crimean War and later the viceroy of Congress Poland.

Pyotr grew up on the family estate Serednikovo (Russian: Середниково) in Solnechnogorsky District, once inhabited by Mikhail Lermontov, near Moscow Governorate. In 1879 the family moved to Oryol. Stolypin and his brother Aleksandr studied at the Oryol Boys College where he was described by his teacher, B. Fedorova, as 'standing out among his peers for his rationalism and character.'

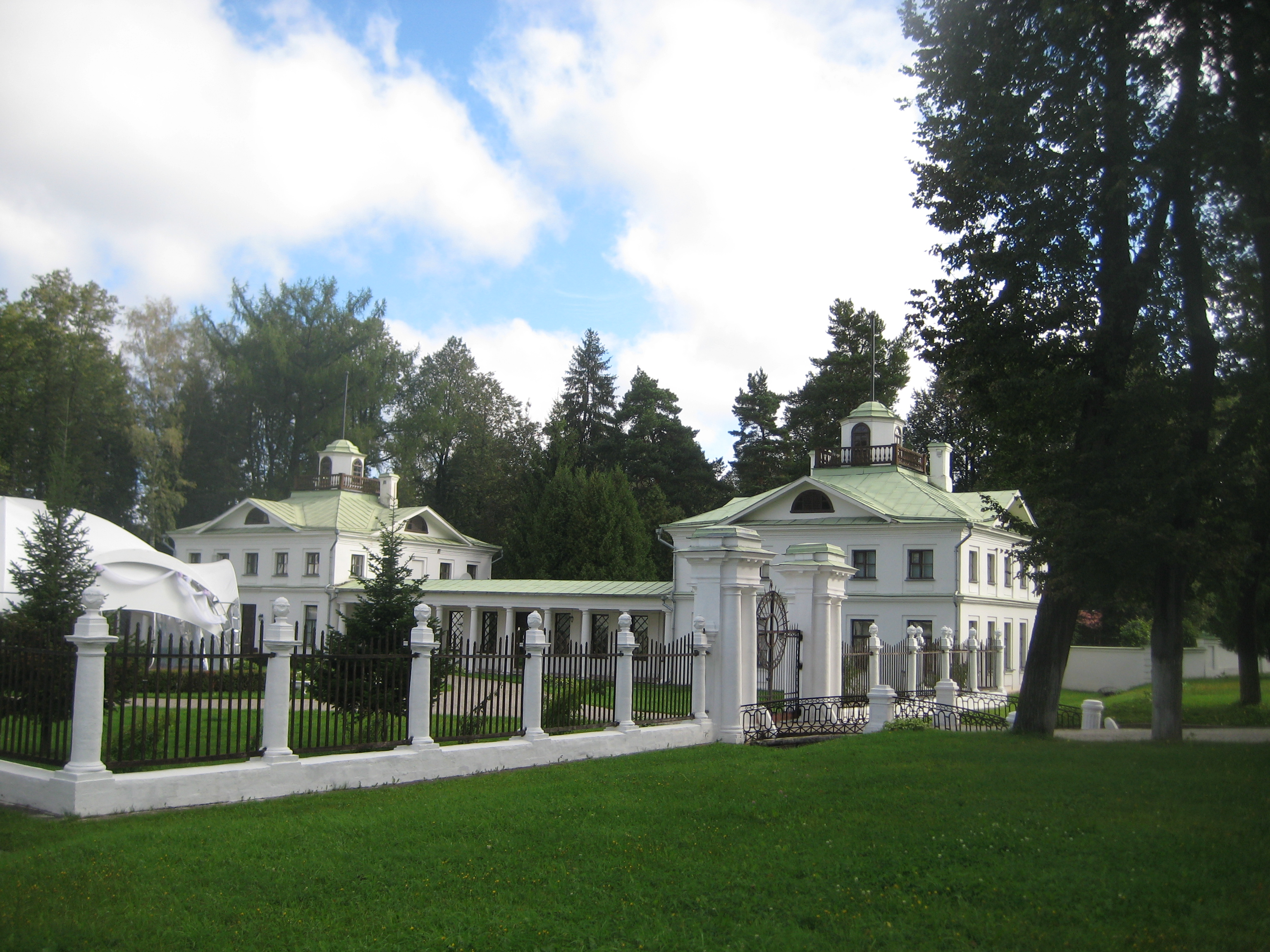
Serednikovo

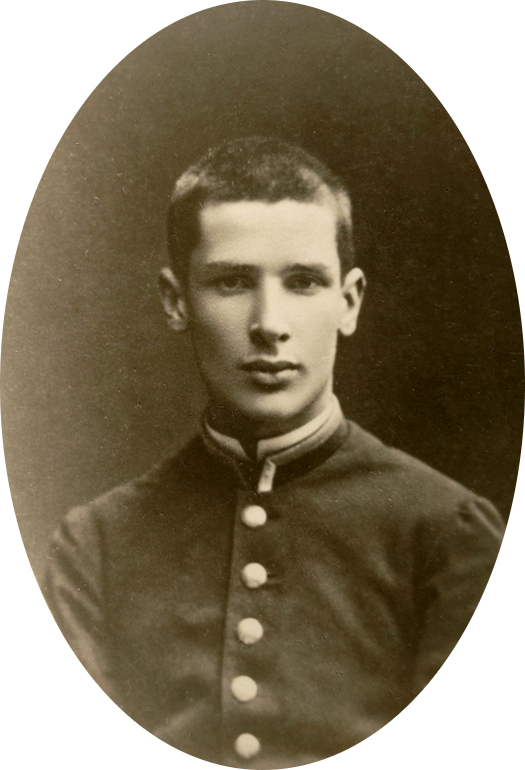
Photo of 14-year-old Stolypin

In 1881 Stolypin studied agriculture at St. Petersburg University where one of his teachers was Dmitri Mendeleev. He entered government service upon graduating in 1885, writing his thesis on tobacco growing in the south of Russia. It is unclear if he joined the Ministry of State Property or Internal Affairs.

In 1884, Stolypin married Olga Borisovna von Neidhart whose family was of a similar standing to Stolypin's. They married whilst Stolypin was still a student, an uncommon occurrence at the time. The marriage began in tragic circumstances: Olga had been engaged to Stolypin's brother, Mikhail, who died in a duel. The marriage was a happy one, devoid of scandal. The couple had five daughters and one son.

=== Lithuania ===
Stolypin spent much of his life and career in Lithuania, then administratively known as Northwestern Krai of the Russian Empire.

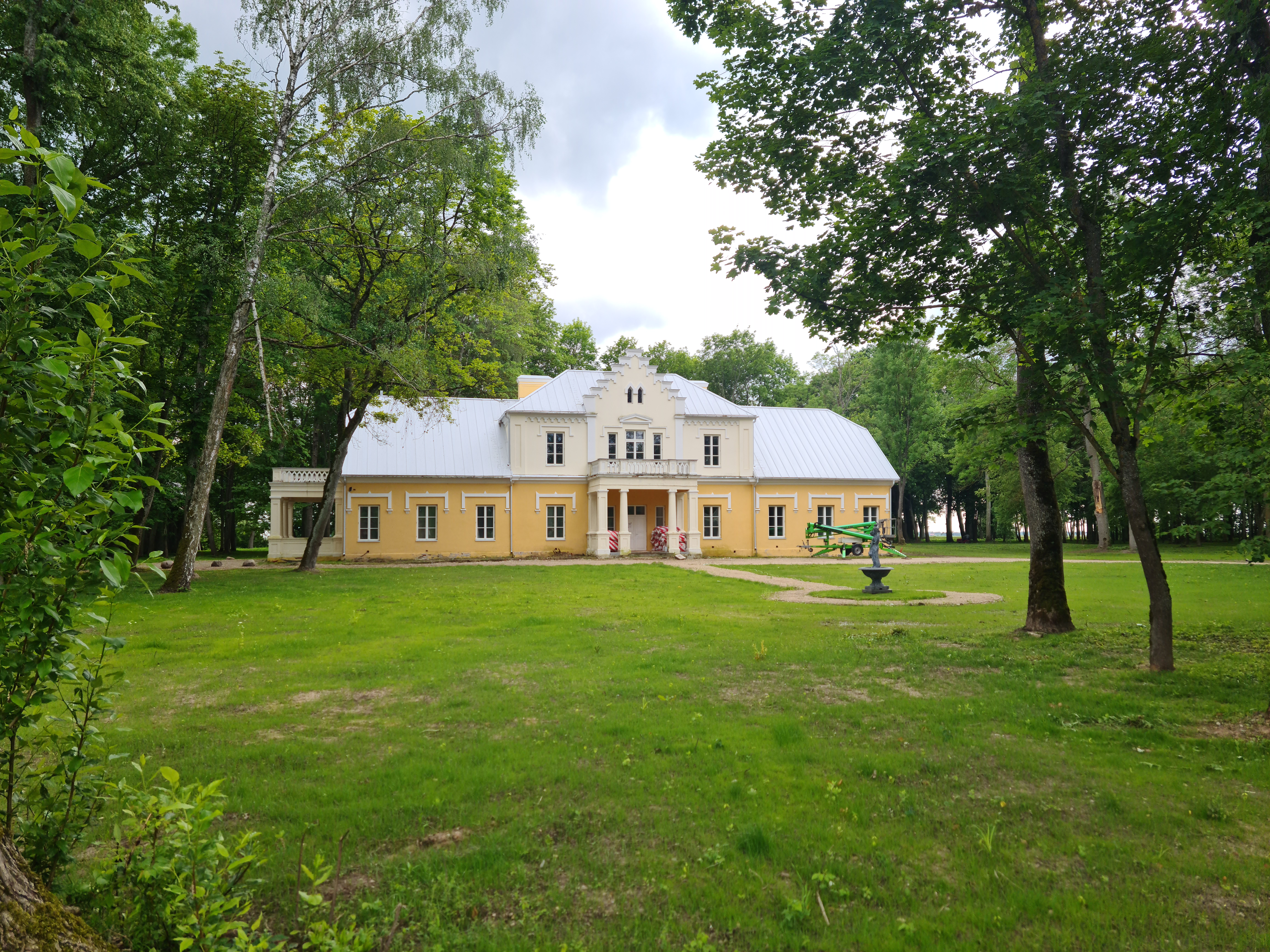
Stolypin's favourite manor house in Kalnaberžė

From 1869, Stolypin spent his childhood years in Kalnaberžė manor (now Kėdainiai district of Lithuania), built by his father, a place that remained his favorite residence for the rest of life. In 1876, the Stolypin family moved to Vilna (now Vilnius), where he attended the 1st Gymnasium from 2nd to 6th grade.

Stolypin served as marshal of the Kovno Governorate (now Kaunas, Lithuania) between 1889 and 1902. This public service gave him an inside view of local needs and allowed him to develop administrative skills. His thinking was influenced by the single-family farmstead system of the Northwestern Krai, and he later sought to introduce the land reform based on private ownership throughout the Russian Empire.

Stolypin's service in Kovno was deemed a success by the Russian government. He was promoted seven times, culminating in his promotion to the rank of state councilor in 1901. Four of his daughters were also born during this period; his daughter Maria recalled: "this was the most calm period [of] his life".

In May 1902 Stolypin was appointed governor in Grodno Governorate, where he was the youngest person ever appointed to this position.

== Governor of Saratov ==
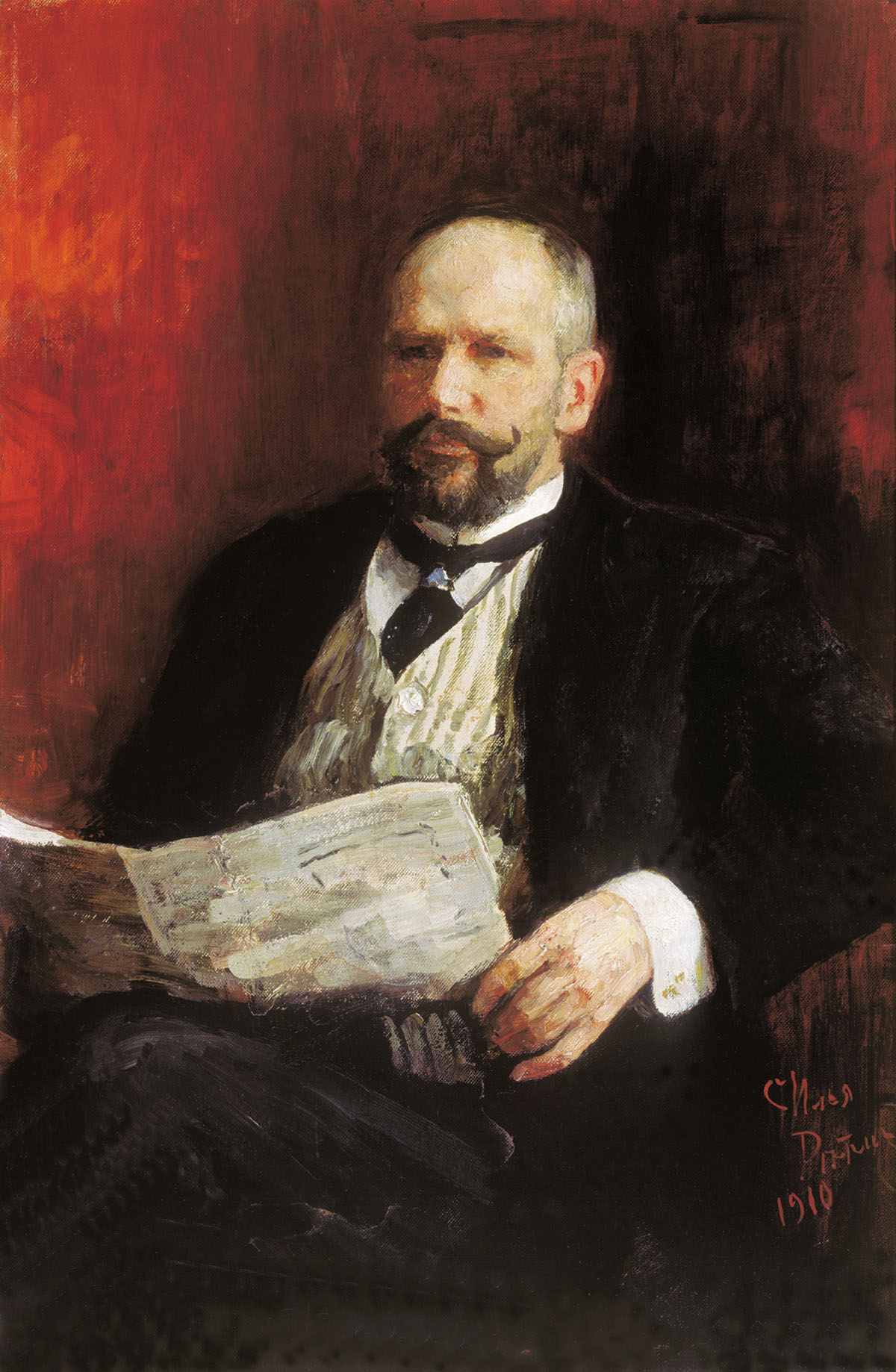
Stolypin by Ilya Repin

In February 1903, he became governor of Saratov. Stolypin is known for suppressing strikers and peasant unrest in January 1905. According to Orlando Figes, its peasants were among the poorest and most rebellious in the whole of the country. It seems he cooperated with the zemstvos, the local government. He gained a reputation as the only governor able to keep a firm hold on his province during the Revolution of 1905, a period of widespread revolt. The roots of unrest lay partly in the Emancipation Reform of 1861, which had given land to the Obshchina, instead of individually to the newly freed serfs. Stolypin was the first governor to use effective police methods. Some sources suggest that he had a police record on every adult male in his province.

== Interior minister and prime minister ==
Stolypin's successes as provincial governor led to his appointment as interior minister under Ivan Goremykin in April 1906. He advocated for a new track of the Trans-Siberian Railway along the Russian side of the Amur river.

The absent-minded Goremykin had been described by his predecessor Sergei Witte as a bureaucratic nonentity. After two months, Dmitri Feodorovich Trepov suggested Goremykin step down and conducted secret negotiations with Pavel Milyukov, who proposed a cabinet of only Kadets, which Trepov believed would fall afoul of Tsar Nicholas II. Trepov opposed Stolypin, who promoted a coalition cabinet. Georgy Lvov and Alexander Guchkov tried to convince the Tsar to accept liberals in the new government.

When Goremykin resigned on 21 July [O.S. 8 July] 1906, Nicholas II appointed Stolypin as Prime Minister, who also remained Minister of the Interior. He dissolved the Duma, despite the reluctance of some of its more radical members, to clear the field for cooperation with the new government. In response, 120 Kadet and 80 Trudovik and Social Democrat deputies went to Vyborg (then under the autonomous Grand Duchy of Finland, beyond the reach of Russian police) and responded with the Vyborg Manifesto (or the "Vyborg Appeal"), written by Pavel Milyukov. Stolypin allowed the signers to return to the capital unmolested.

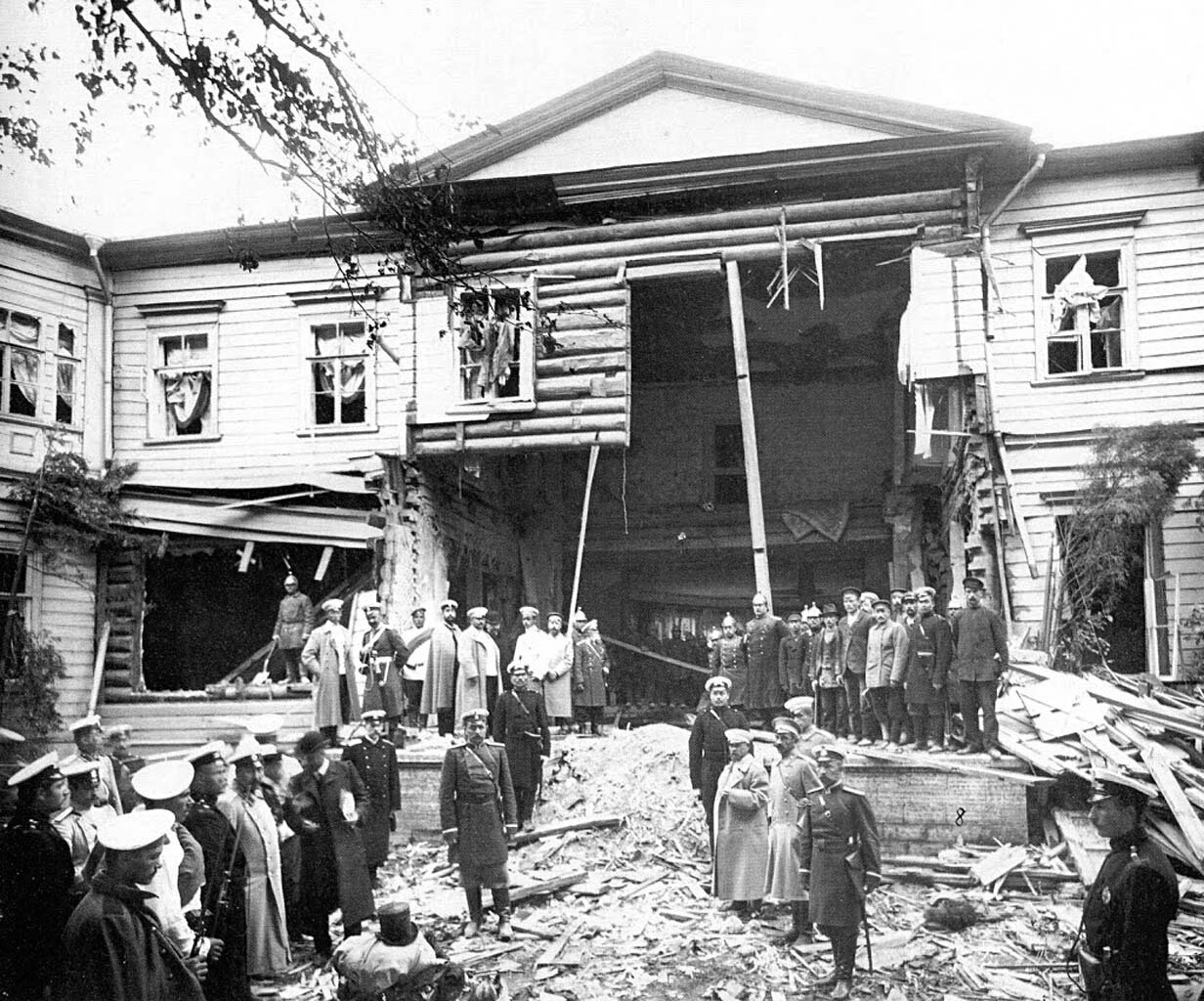
Stolypin's wooden villa after the August 1906 attempted assassination. One third was blown to pieces.

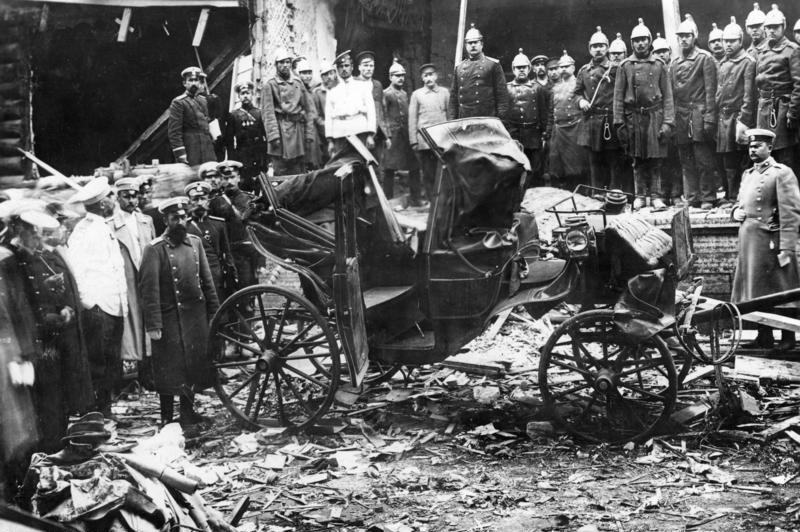
The aftermath of the attempted assassination of Stolypin.

On 25 August 1906, three assassins from the Union of Socialists-Revolutionaries Maximalists, wearing military uniforms, bombed a public reception Stolypin was holding at his dacha on Aptekarsky Island. Stolypin was only slightly injured by flying splinters, but 28 others were killed. Two of Stolypin’s daughters were badly wounded in the bombing, one of them so seriously that doctors initially believed that both of her legs might have to be amputated, while his son was slightly wounded. An early report in The New York Times claimed that Stolypin’s daughter Natalia had died from her wounds. However, this report was subsequently corrected. Natalia survived the bombing, remaining under medical treatment for two years and retaining both legs. Stolypin moved into the Winter Palace. On 9 November an imperial decree made far-reaching changes in land tenure law, disrupting in one sweep the communal and the household (family) property systems.

Stolypin changed the rules of the First Duma to attempt to make it more amenable to government proposals. On 8 June 1907, Stolypin dissolved the Second Duma, and 15 Kadets who had associated with terrorists were arrested; he also changed the weight of votes in favor of the nobility and wealthy, reducing the value of lower-class votes. The leading Kadets were ineligible. This affected the elections to the Third Duma, which returned much more conservative members eager to cooperate with the government. This changed Georgy Lvov from a moderate liberal into a radical.

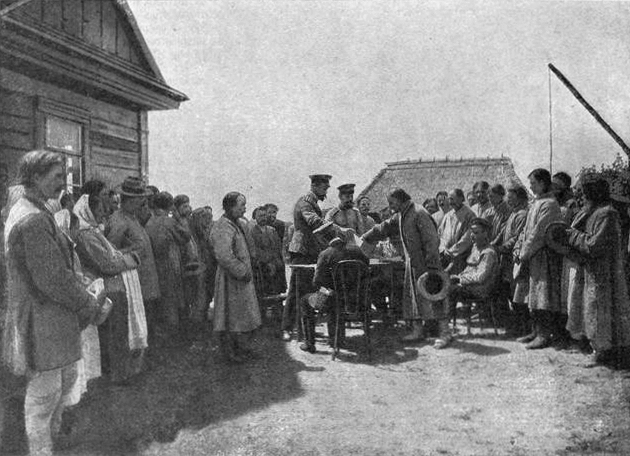
Distribution of newly formed farms in Grodno Governorate (1909)

As governor in Saratov, Stolypin had become convinced that the open field system had to be abolished; communal land tenure had to go. The chief obstacle appeared to be the Mir (commune), so its dissolution and the individualization of peasant land ownership became the leading objectives of his agrarian policy. He introduced Denmark-style land reforms to allay peasant grievances and soothe dissent. Stolypin proposed his own landlord-sided reform in opposition to the previous democratic proposals which led to the dissolution of the first two Russian parliaments. Stolypin's reforms aimed to stem peasant unrest by creating a class of market-oriented smallholders who would support the social order. He was assisted by Alexander Krivoshein, who in 1908 became Minister of Agriculture. In June 1908 Stolypin lived in a wing of the Yelagin Palace where the Council of Ministers convened.

Supported by the Peasants' Land Bank, credit cooperatives proliferated from 1908, and Russian industry was booming. Stolypin tried to improve the lives of urban laborers and worked towards increasing the power of local governments, but the zemstvos adopted an attitude hostile to the government.

Leo Tolstoy was particularly indignant, writing to Stolypin: "Stop your horrible activity! Enough of looking up to Europe, it is high time Russia knew its own mind!" Tolstoy had argued similarly to Dostoyevsky, who was in favor of private ownership of land and wrote: "If you want to transform humanity for the better, to turn almost beasts into humans, give them land and you will reach your goal."

In 1910, Stolypin's brother-in-law Sergey Sazonov became Minister of Foreign Affairs, replacing Count Alexander Izvolsky. Around 1910 the press started a campaign against Rasputin, accusing him of improper sexual relations. Stolypin wanted to ban Rasputin from the capital and threatened to prosecute him as a sectarian. Rasputin decamped to Jerusalem, returning to St. Petersburg only after Stolypin's death.

On 14 June 1910, Stolypin's land reforms came before the Duma as a formal law, including a proposal to spread the zemstvo system to the southwestern provinces of Asian Russia. Though the law seemed likely to pass, Stolypin's political opponents narrowly defeated it. In March 1911 Stolypin resigned from the fractious and chaotic Duma after the failure of his land-reform bill. Tsar Nicholas II decided to look for a successor to Stolypin and considered Sergei Witte, Vladimir Kokovtsov and Alexei Khvostov. The Moscow Times has summarized his career:

Pyotr Stolypin's reforms produced astounding results within a few years. Between 1906 and 1915, thanks to the efforts of Stolypin's farmers, the productivity of crops nationwide grew by 14 percent, in Siberia by 25 percent. In 1912, Russia's grain exports exceeded by 30 percent those of Argentina, the United States and Canada combined.

== Assassination ==
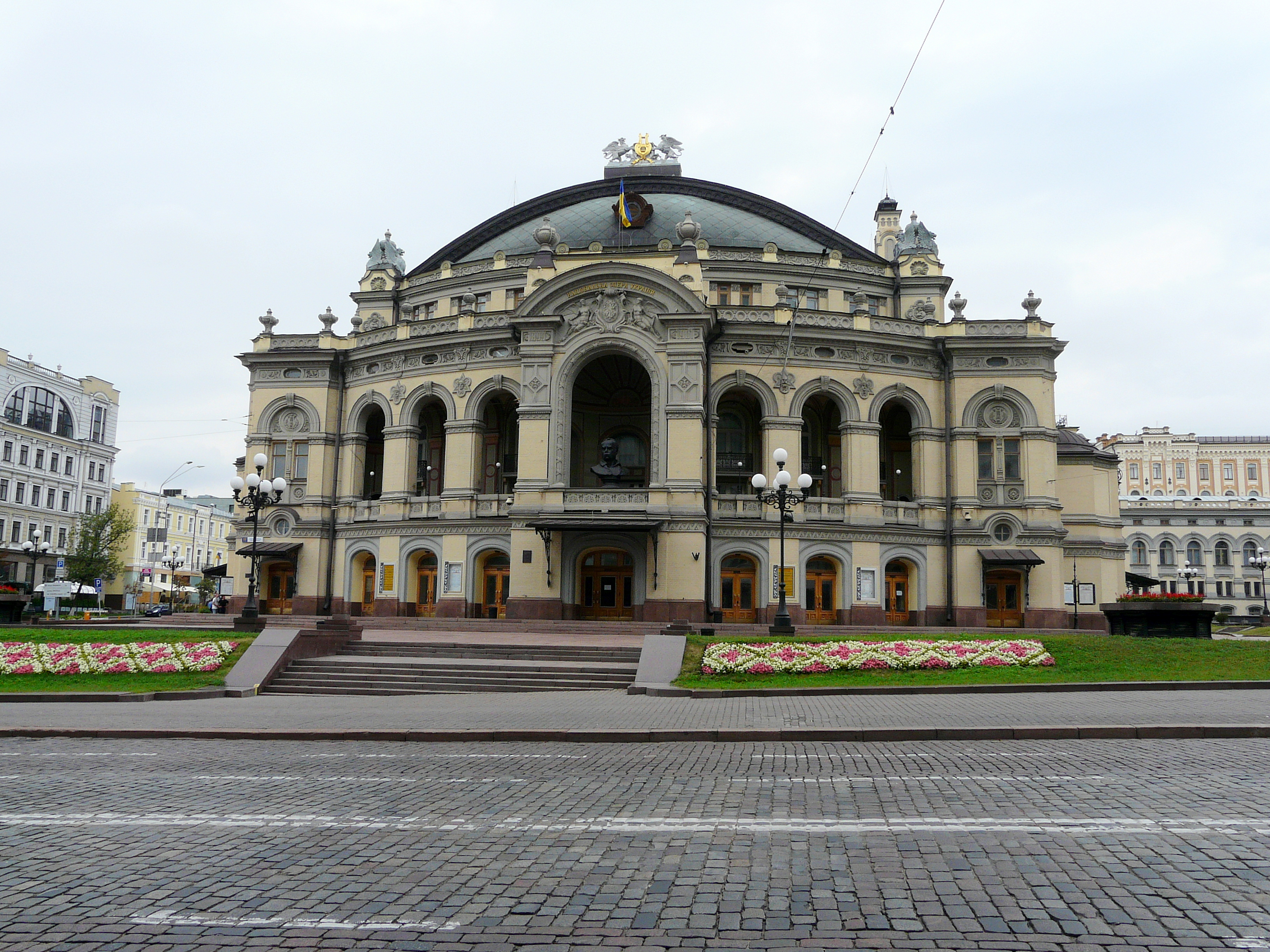
Kiev Opera House where Stolypin was assassinated

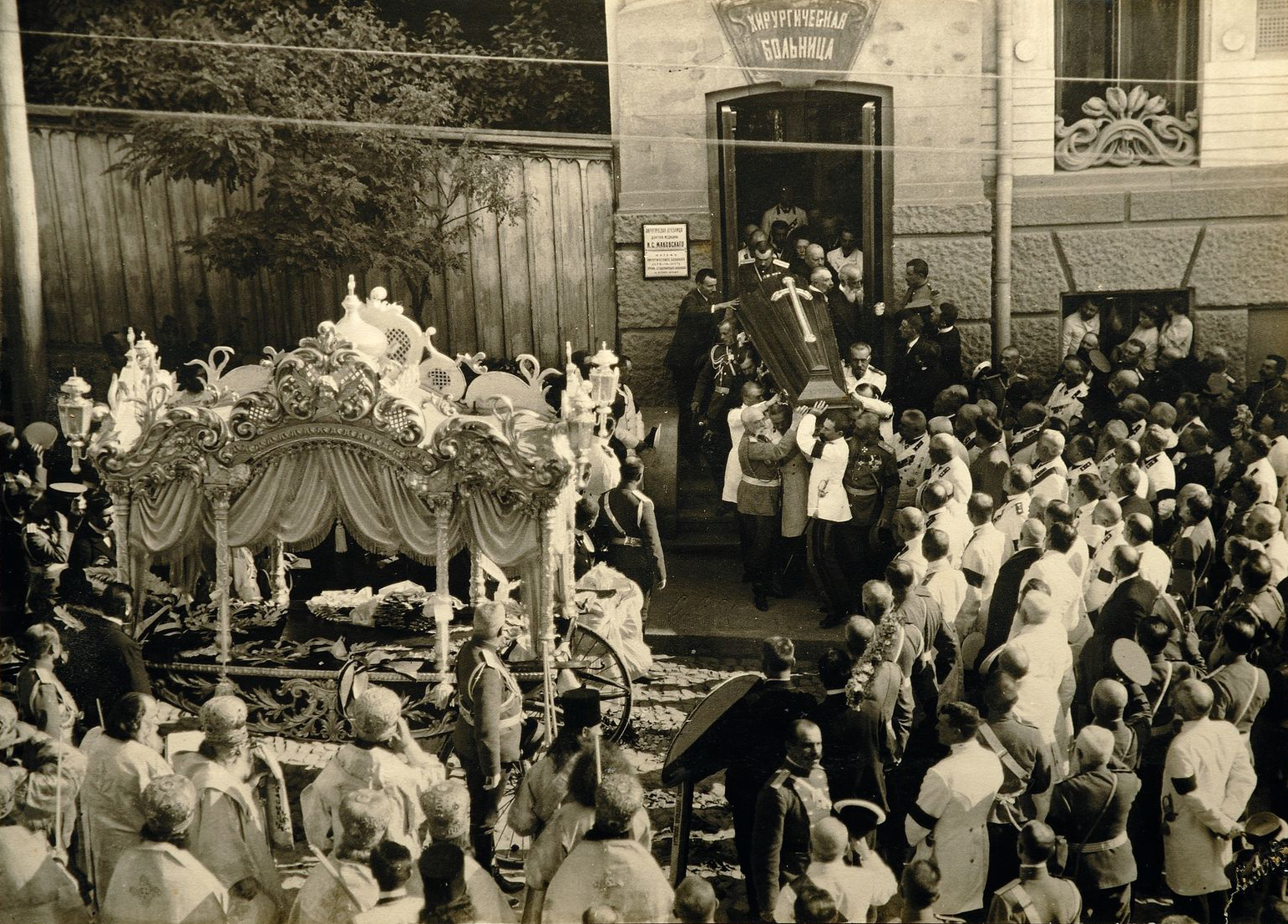
Stolypin's burial.

Stolypin traveled to Kiev despite police warnings of an assassination plot, as there had already been 10 attempts to kill him. On 14 September [O.S. 1 September] 1911, Stolypin attended a performance of Rimsky-Korsakov's The Tale of Tsar Saltan at the Kiev Opera in the presence of the tsar and his eldest daughters, grand duchesses Olga and Tatiana. The theater was guarded by 90 men inside the building. According to Alexander Spiridovich, after the second act "Stolypin was standing in front of the ramp separating the parterre from the orchestra, his back to the stage. On his right were Baron Freedericksz and Gen. Sukhomlinov." His personal bodyguard had stepped out to smoke. Stolypin was shot twice, once in the arm and once in the chest, by Dmitry Bogrov, a Jewish leftist revolutionary. Bogrov ran to one of the entrances and was caught. Stolypin rose from his chair, removed his gloves and unbuttoned his jacket, exposing a blood-soaked waistcoat. He gestured to the tsar to go back and made the sign of the cross. He remained conscious, but his condition deteriorated. He died four days later.

Bogrov was hanged 10 days after the assassination. The judicial investigation was halted by order of the tsar, giving rise to suggestions that the assassination was planned not by leftists, but by conservative monarchists opposed to Stolypin's reforms and his influence on the tsar. However, this has never been proven. On his request, Stolypin was buried in the city where he was murdered.

== Legacy ==
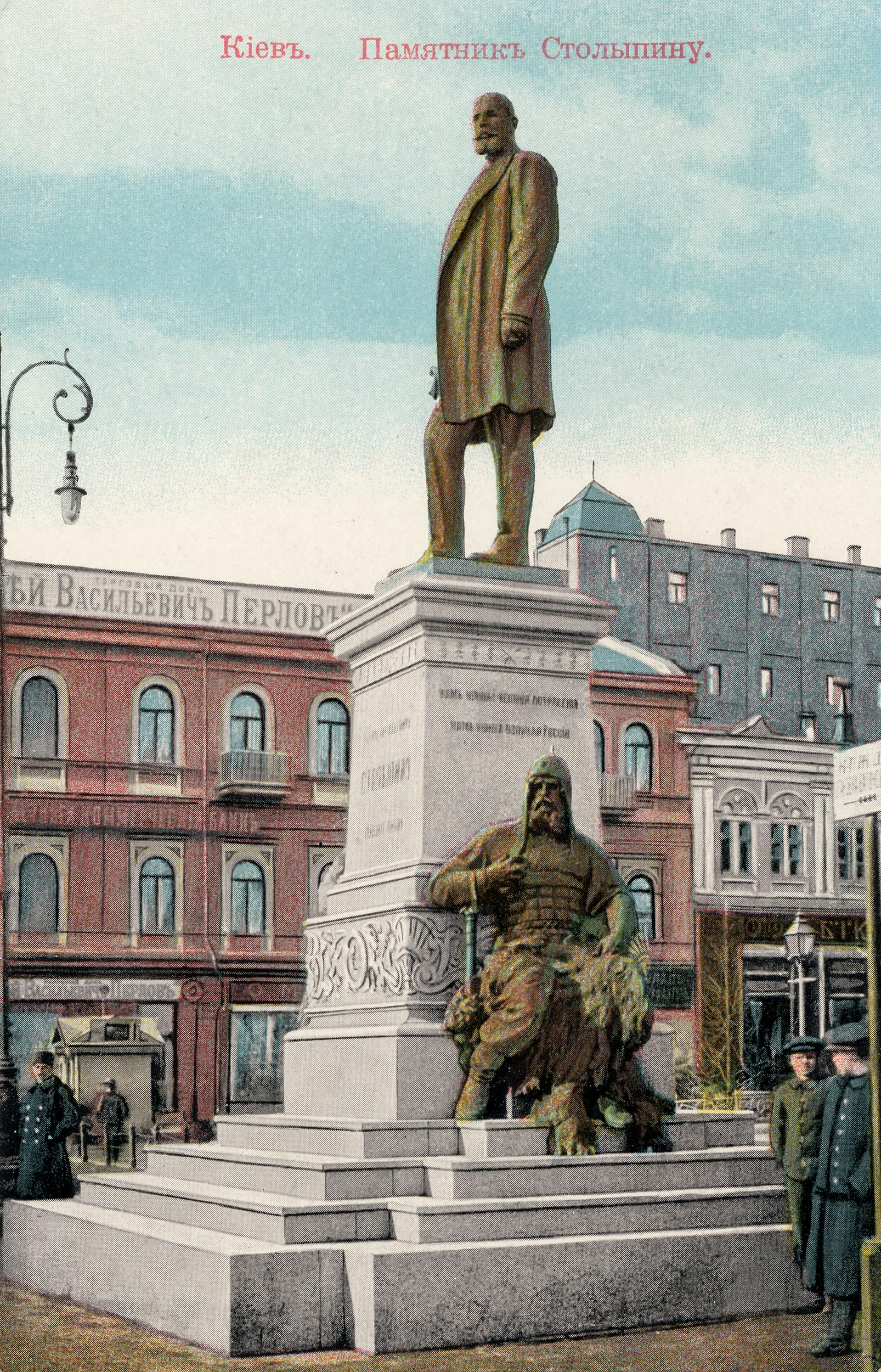
A statue of Pyotr Stolypin near the Kyiv City Duma building, removed after the February Revolution.

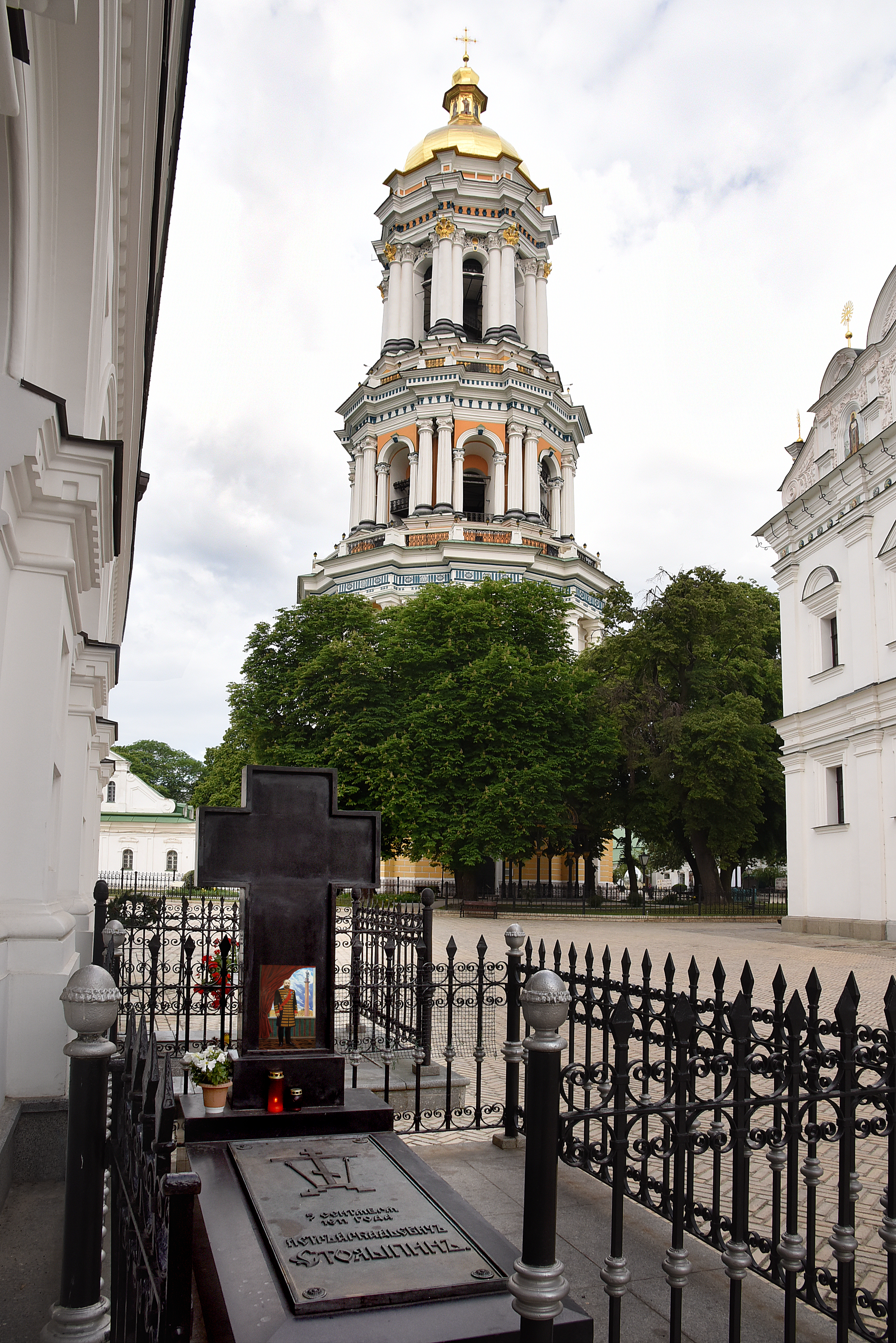
Stolypin's grave in the Pechersk Monastery (Lavra) in Kyiv.

Since 1905 Russia had been plagued by widespread political dissatisfaction and revolutionary unrest. With broad support, leftist organizations waged a violent campaign against the autocracy; throughout Russia, many police officials and bureaucrats were assassinated. "Stolypin inspected rebellious areas unarmed and without bodyguards. During one of these trips, somebody dropped a bomb under his feet. There were casualties, but Stolypin survived." To respond to these attacks, Stolypin introduced a new court system of martial law, that allowed for the arrest and speedy trial of accused offenders. Over 3,000 (possibly 5,500) suspects were convicted and executed by these special courts between 1906 and 1909. In a Duma session on 17 November 1907, Kadet party member Fyodor Rodichev referred to the gallows as "Stolypin's efficient black Monday necktie". Outraged, Stolypin challenged Rodichev to a duel, but Rodichev apologized to avert it. Nevertheless, the expression became popular. The capacious railroad cars used for Siberian resettlement were named Stolypin cars.

There remains doubt whether, even without the disruption of Stolypin's murder and the First World War, his agricultural policy could have succeeded. The deep conservatism of the mass of peasants made them slow to respond. In 1914 the strip system was still widespread, with only around 10% of the land having been consolidated into farms. Most peasants were unwilling to leave the security of the commune for the uncertainty of individual farming. Furthermore, by 1913, the government's Ministry of Agriculture had itself begun to lose confidence in the policy. Nevertheless, Krivoshein became the most powerful figure in the Imperial government.

Lenin in the Paris newspaper "Social-Democrat" on 31 October 1911, wrote "Stolypin and the Revolution", calling for the "mortification of the uber-lyncher", saying: ″Stolypin tried to pour new wine into old bottles, to reshape the old autocracy into a bourgeois monarchy; and the failure of Stolypin's policy is the failure of tsarism on this last, the last conceivable, road for tsarism."

In "Name of Russia", a 2008 television poll to select "the greatest Russian", Stolypin placed second, behind Alexander Nevsky and followed by Joseph Stalin. He is seen by his admirers as the greatest statesman Russia ever had, the one who could have saved the country from revolution and the civil war. The Stolypin Medal was introduced by the Government of the Russian Federation in 2008, for "achievements in addressing strategic socioeconomic development objectives, including the implementation of long-term projects of the Government of the Russian Federation in industry, agriculture, construction, transport, science, education, healthcare, culture, and other areas."

On 27 December 2012, a monument to Pyotr Stolypin was unveiled in Moscow to mark the 150th anniversary of his birth. The monument, designed by Andrei Korobtsov is situated near the Russian White House, seat of the Government of Russia. At the foot of the pedestal, a bronze plaque quotes Stolypin: "We must all unite in defense of Russia, coordinate our efforts, our duties and our rights in order to maintain one of Russia's historic supreme rights – to be strong."

== Screen portrayals ==
Stolypin is portrayed by Eric Porter in the opening scenes of the 1971 British film Nicholas and Alexandra, fictitiously taking part in the Romanov dynasty tercentenary celebrations of 1913 before being assassinated later in the film, two years after his actual assassination.

Stolypin is portrayed by Frank Middlemass in episode 9 of the 1974 British miniseries Fall of Eagles, Dress Rehearsal.

== See also ==
- Coup of June 1907
- Stolypin reform

Political offices
Preceded by Pyotr Nikolayevich Durnovo	Minister of Interior; 26 April 1906 – 18 September 1911	Succeeded by Aleksandr Aleksandrovich Makarov
Preceded by Ivan Goremykin	Prime Minister of Russia; 21 July 1906 – 18 September 1911	Succeeded by Vladimir Kokovtsov
