= Ministry of Trade and Industry of the Russian Empire =

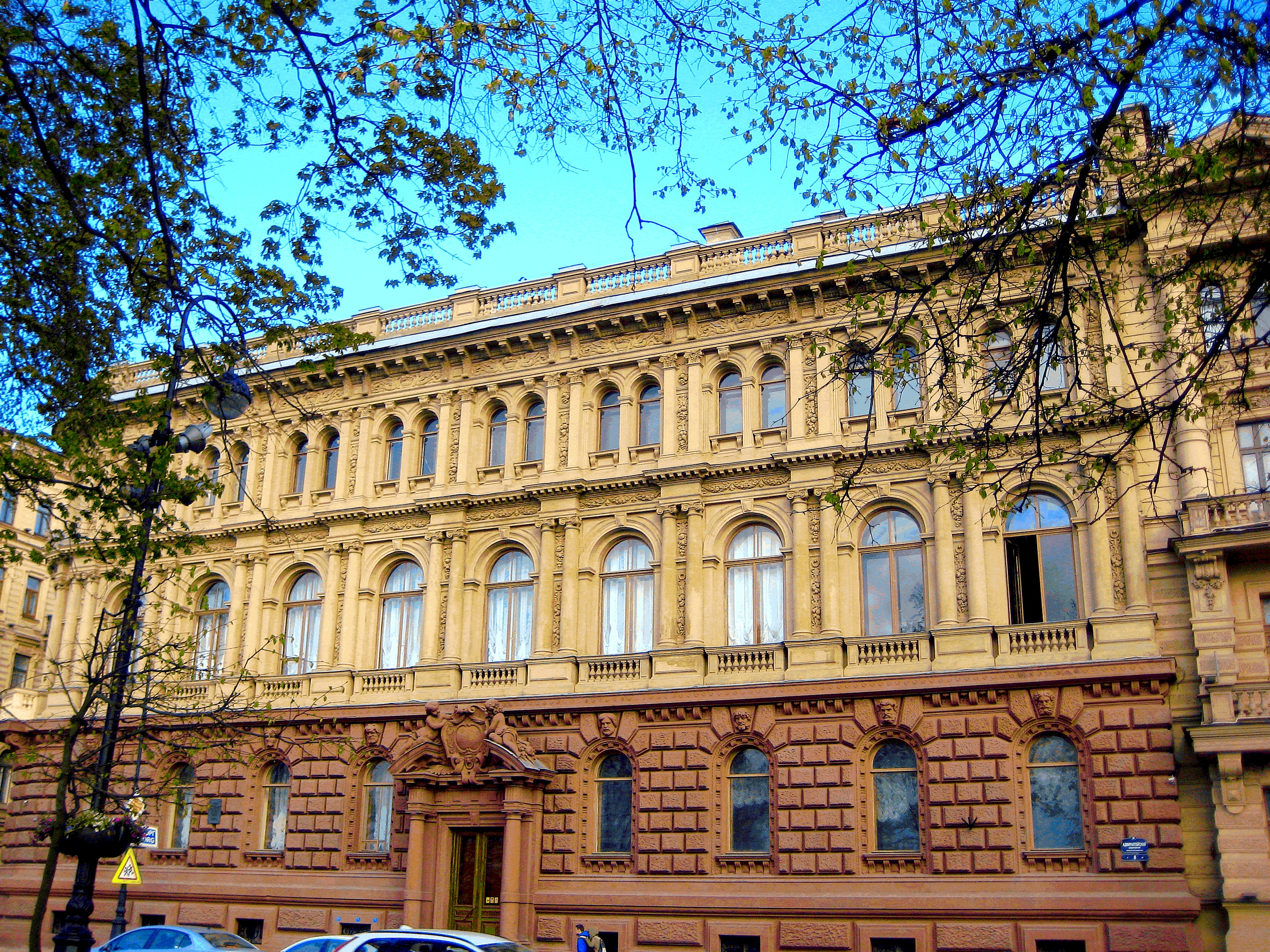

Agency overview
- Formed: November 9, 1905
- Preceding agency: Ministry of Commerce of the Russian Empire
- Dissolved: November 8, 1917
- Jurisdiction: Russian Empire
- Headquarters: Sankt–Peterburg, Admiralteyskaya Embankment, 8
- Ministers responsible: Vasiliy Timiryazev (first); Aleksandr Konovalov (last)
- Parent department: Council of Ministers of the Russian Empire

The Ministry of Trade and Industry was the central government agency for the management of government industry and the supervision of private industry and trade.

== Creation ==
It was formed by decree on October 27, 1905. Institutions for Trade and Industry and for the Mining Sector, the Council for Tariff Affairs, the Tariff Committee and the Department of Railway Affairs, with the exception of the departments in charge of financial settlements between the treasury and railway companies, were transferred to its composition from the Ministry of Finance.

The new ministry also included the General Directorate of Merchant Shipping and Ports. From the Ministry of Internal Affairs to the new ministry all matters related to merchant societies, merchant and craft councils were transferred.

The ministry owned a number of buildings in Sankt–Peterburg, including at the addresses: Mytninskaya Embankment, 7 and Admiralteyskaya Embankment, 8.

== Ministers ==
- Vasiliy Timiryazev: October 1905 – February 1906. At this time, the position of Chief Executive of Merchant Shipping was abolished; the position of Comrade of the Chief Executive was renamed into the post of Comrade Minister of Trade and Industry, the Council Under the Chief Executive was renamed into the Council of the Minister, and so on; the Office of the Chief Executive was combined with the Office of the Comrade Minister of Finance, who was in charge of trade and industry, into one common Office of the Minister of Trade and Industry;
- Mikhail Fyodorov: from February 18 to May 4, 1906, Temporary Executive of the Ministry of Trade and Industry;
- Aleksandr Shtof: from May 5 to July 26, 1906, also Temporary Executive;
- Dmitriy Filosofov: from July 27, 1906, to December 6, 1907, Minister. After less than a year and a half in office, he died suddenly; until January 30, the ministry was temporarily managed by Mikhail Ostrogradskiy;
- Ivan Shipov: from January 31, 1908, to January 13, 1909, Minister;
- Vasiliy Timiryazev: from January 14, 1909, to November 5, 1909, for the second time as Minister;
- Sergey Timashev: from November 5, 1909, to February 17, 1915, Minister;
- Vsevolod Shakhovskoy: from February 18, 1915, to February 28, 1917.

== Organization of industrial evacuation during the First World War ==
In view of the approach of the advancing German troops to the industrialised regions of the empire (Varshava, Riga) in June 1915, the members of the Military–Technical Committee of the All–Russian City Union sent a letter to the Minister of Trade and Industry Vsevolod Shakhovskoy: "It is absolutely inadmissible to continue preserving in such places as Riga, Varshava and the like, large manufacturing enterprises that prepare items of military equipment or are in any way connected with this business. Therefore, it is necessary for the government to urgently take decisive measures to transfer such enterprises to a more favorable environment in the rear".

When Varshava was threatened with capture in July 1915, 50 million rubls were allocated from the treasury for the evacuation of defence enterprises, but only 85 enterprises could be evacuated.

On August 7, 1915, an order was adopted in the Dvinsk Military District to grant factories producing items necessary for "state needs" the right to export factory equipment and materials from the cities of Dvinsk and Vilna to "inner Rossiya". The District Headquarters was responsible for the evacuation.

In Riga, about 500 factories were subject to evacuation. The coordination of the work was entrusted in July 1915 to the head of the Sestroretsk Arms Factory, Major General Anatoliy Zalyubovskiy. The commander of the 5th Army, Pavel Pleve, granted him unlimited powers. Before September 1, 1915, 172 enterprises were evacuated from Riga: to Moskva, Petrograd, Nizhniy Novgorod, as well as to the southern provinces – Ekaterinoslav, Kharkov, Donets Basin, where metalworking factories mainly moved.

From other regions, due to unsatisfactory organization of actions, only a few enterprises were evacuated, and some of the evacuees never resumed production.

== Ministry of Trade and Industry of the Provisional Government of Rossiya ==
From March 3, 1917, to June 1917, the post of minister was filled by Aleksandr Konovalov. From June 1917 to September 1917, the post of minister was filled by Sergey Prokopovich. From September 1917 to October 26, 1917, the position of minister was again filled by Aleksandr Konovalov. The ministry was liquidated on October 26, 1917.

== Sources ==
- Ministry of Trade and Industry // Encyclopedic Dictionary of Brockhaus and Efron: In 86 Volumes (82 Volumes and 4 Additional Ones) – Sankt–Peterburg, 1890–1907
