= Woldemar Freedericksz =

Statesman from the Russian Empire

Count Woldemar Freedericksz
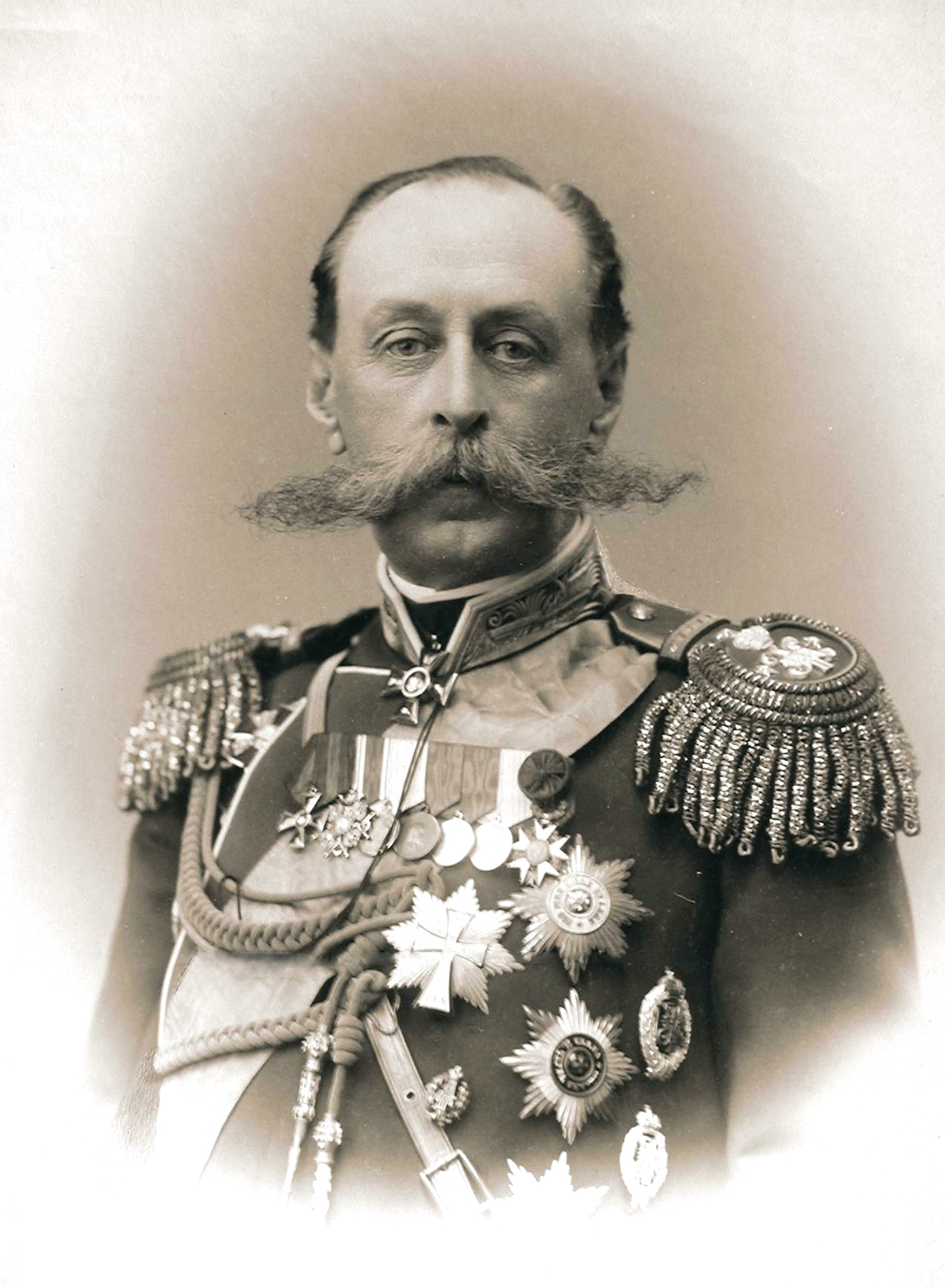
- Portrait, 1896–1898

Minister of the Imperial Court
- In office 18 May [O.S. 6] 1897 – 12 March [O.S. 28 February] 1917
- Monarch: Nicholas II
- Preceded by: Illarion Vorontsov-Dashkov
- Succeeded by: Position abolished

Personal details
- Born: 28 November [O.S. 16] 1838 Saint Petersburg, Russian Empire
- Died: 1 July 1927 (aged 88) Kauniainen, Finland
- Resting place: Kauniainen Cemetery

Military service
- Allegiance: Russian Empire
- Branch/service: Russian Imperial Army
- Years of service: 1856–1917
- Rank: General of the Cavalry
- Commands: Life-Guards Horse Regiment; Chevalier Guard Regiment

Count Adolf Andreas Woldemar Freedericksz (Russian: Владимир Борисович Фредерикс, romanized: Vladimir Borisovich Frederiks; 28 November [O.S. 16] 1838 – 1 July 1927) was a Finland Swedish-Russian statesman who served as Imperial Household Minister between 1897 and 1917 under Nicholas II. He was responsible for the administration of the Imperial family's personal affairs and living arrangements, as well as the awarding of Imperial honours and medals.

== Biography ==
=== Family ===
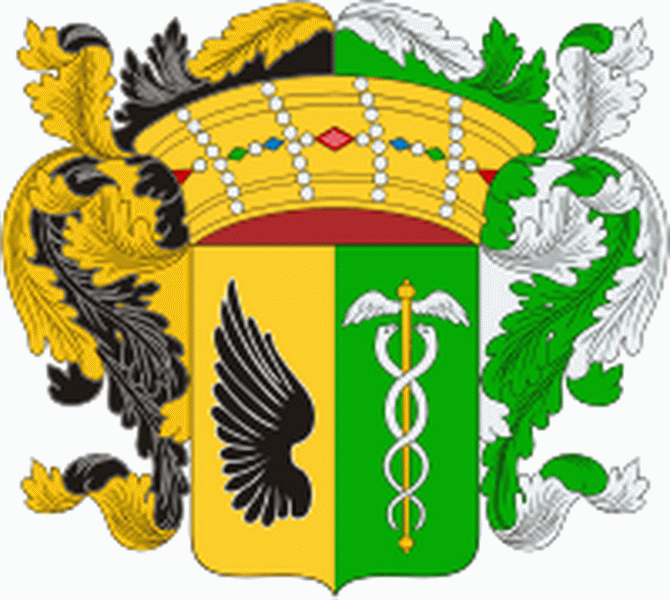
Coat of arms of the Freedericksz family (1798)

Adolf Andreas Woldemar Freedericksz was born on 28 November [O.S. 16] 1838 to Finnish Baron Bernhard (Boris Andreyevich) Freedericksz and Baltic German noblewoman Emma Matilda Helene (Emma Adolfovna) von Wulff and the family traditionally believed in Lutheran faith. There had been several stories dedicated to the family's origin. The first was that the family probably originated from Arkhangelsk. Jürgen Freedericksz, who was a Dutch merchant, was the first ever recorded ancestor of the family, and the family was recordedly formed by his son, Johan (Ivan Yuryevich) Freedericksz. The baronial title of the family was granted by Catherine the Great in 1773. The second version was that the family was formed by the son of Jöran Fredriksson, a Swedish soldier captured during The Great Northern War. In the late 18th century, the Freedericksz family dominated in the fiefs given to them in what was later to be known as Old Finland. In 1853, Woldemar's father Bernhard was naturalized into the Finnish House of Nobility as the baronial family number 36 under the name Freedricksz. Upon Woldemar Freedericksz's death in 1927 the Finnish baronial family was extinct in the male line, and was completely extinct by the time of the deaths of Woldemar's daughters Eugenie and Emma. His Russian comital title was never accepted into the Finnish nobility. Woldemar himself married to Hedwig Johanna Alexandrina (Jadwiga Aloizievna) Boguszewska and had two daughters, Baronesses Eugenie Valeria Josefina (Evgenia-Valentina-Zhozefina Vladimirovna) and Emma Helena Sofia (Emma-Elena-Sofia Vladimirovna) Freedericksz.

=== Career ===
As the part of a wealthy family, Freedericksz received home education at an early age. Succeeding Count Vorontsov-Daskov at the Ministry at the age of 60, Freedericksz established a close relationship with Tsar Nicholas II, and Empress Alexandra, calling them 'mes enfants' in private. He was praised in this role by the French ambassador, Maurice Paléologue, who called him 'the very personification of court life'. However, in later life, he became forgetful and ill and often fell asleep during conferences. Freedericksz was a strong conservative who described the deputies of the First Duma as: "The Deputies, they give one the impression of a gang of criminals who are only waiting for the signal to throw themselves upon the ministers and cut their throats. I will never again set foot among those people."

== Later life ==
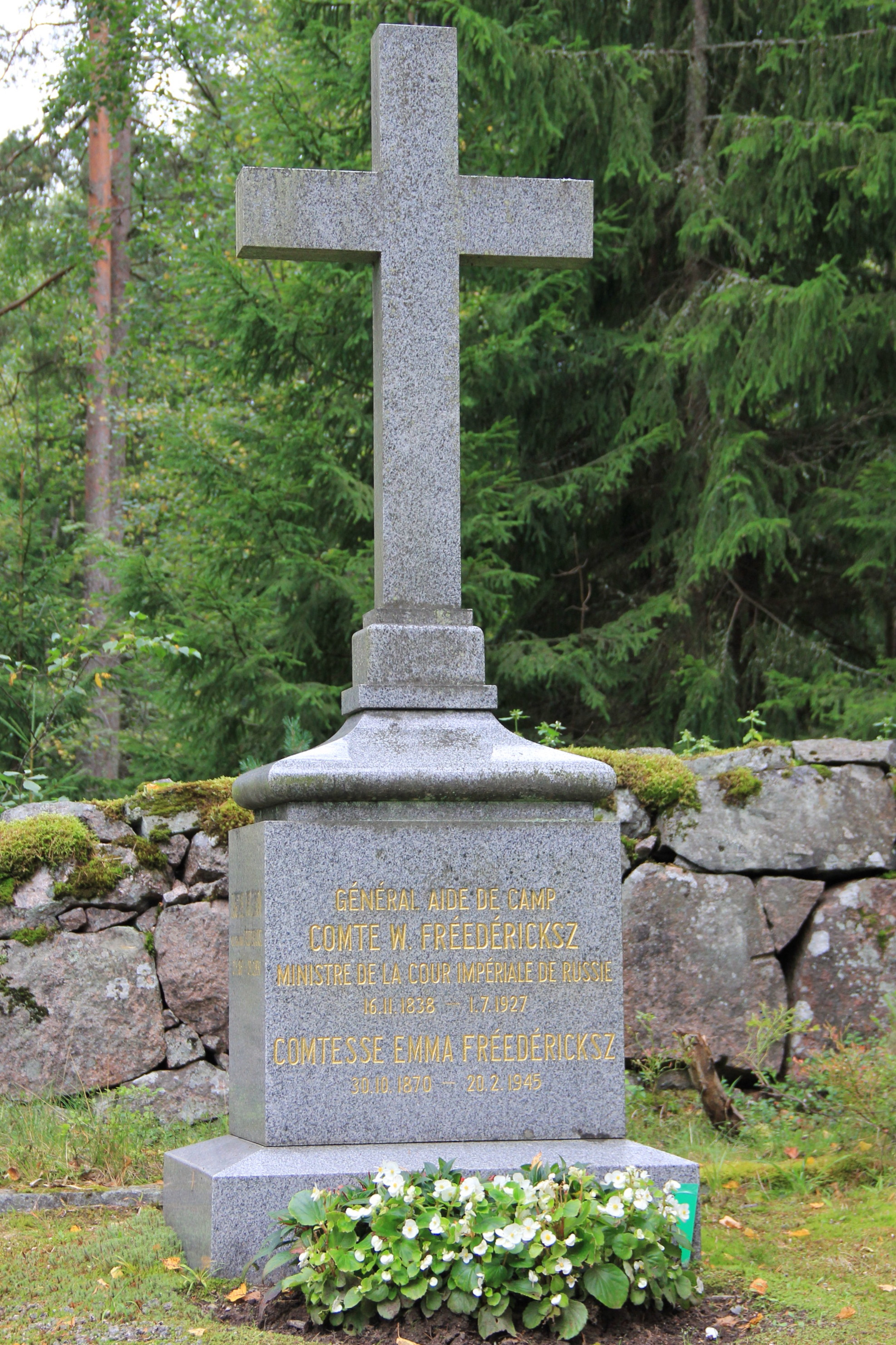
Freedericksz's grave in Kauniainen, Finland.

His private mansion in St. Petersburg was pillaged and set on fire on the first day of February Revolution. After the Revolution, Freedericksz lived in Petrograd before being allowed in 1925 to leave for Finland, where he spent the last years of his life.

== Honours and awards ==
=== Russian orders and decorations ===
- Knight of St. Stanislaus, 2nd Class, 30 August 1869; 1st Class, 15 May 1883
- Knight of St. Vladimir, 4th Class, 30 August 1873; 3rd Class, 19 February 1880; 2nd Class, 30 August 1889; 1st Class, 6 December 1906
- Knight of St. Anna, 2nd Class, 26 August 1876; 1st Class, 30 August 1886
- Knight of the White Eagle, 2 April 1895
- Knight of St. Alexander Nevsky, 1 January 1899
- Knight of St. Andrew, 25 March 1908

Medals

- Medal "In Memory of the War of 1853–1856"
- Medal "In Memory of the Coronation of Emperor Alexander III"
- Medal "In Memory of the Coronation of Emperor Nicholas II"
- Medal "In Memory of the Reign of Emperor Alexander III"
- Medal of the Red Cross "In Memory of the Russo-Japanese War" (1906)
- Medal "In Memory of the Russo-Japanese War" (1906)
- Medal "In Memory of the 200th Anniversary of the Battle of Poltava"

=== Foreign orders and decorations ===
- Württemberg: Grand Cross of the Friedrich Order, 1891
- Sweden:
  - Commander Grand Cross of the Sword, 15 February 1892
  - Knight of the Seraphim, 12 May 1908
- Principality of Montenegro: Grand Cross of the Order of Prince Danilo I, 1894
- Grand Duchy of Hesse:
  - Grand Cross of the Merit Order of Philip the Magnanimous, 26 November 1894
  - Grand Cross of the Ludwig Order, 4 November 1899
- Denmark:
  - Grand Cross of the Dannebrog, 1 December 1894
  - Knight of the Elephant, 16 July 1909
- Kingdom of Serbia:
  - Grand Cross of the Cross of Takovo, 1895
  - Grand Cross of the Star of Karađorđe
- (Austrian Empire) (Kingdom of Hungary) Austria-Hungary:
  - Knight of the Iron Crown, 1st Class, 1895
  - Grand Cross of the Imperial Order of Leopold, 1900
  - Grand Cross of the Royal Hungarian Order of St. Stephen, 1903
- United Kingdom: Honorary Knight Commander of the Royal Victorian Order, 30 June 1896; Honorary Knight Grand Cross, 10 June 1908
- France: Grand Cross of the Legion of Honour, September 1897
- Baden: Knight of the House Order of Fidelity, 1899
- Kingdom of Prussia: Grand Cross of the Red Eagle, 1899; in Diamonds, 21 September 1901
- Kingdom of Italy: Knight of the Annunciation, 23 October 1909

== Cultural depictions ==
He was portrayed in the 1971 film Nicholas and Alexandra by Jack Hawkins. In 1983, he was portrayed by Vsevolod Safonov in the 1983 film Anna Pavlova directed by Emil Loteanu.
