= Ministry of Justice of the Russian Empire =

- Министерство юстиции Российской империи
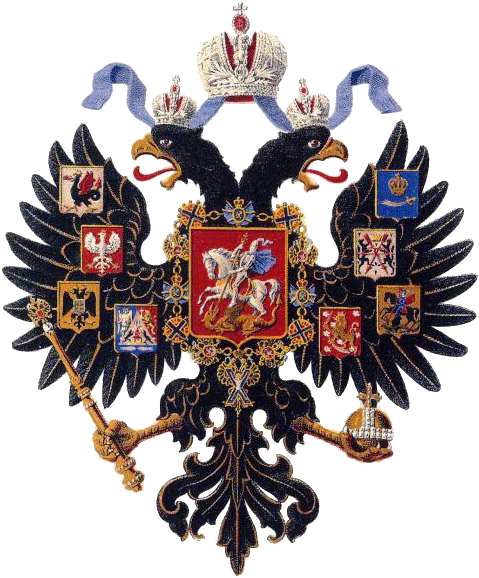

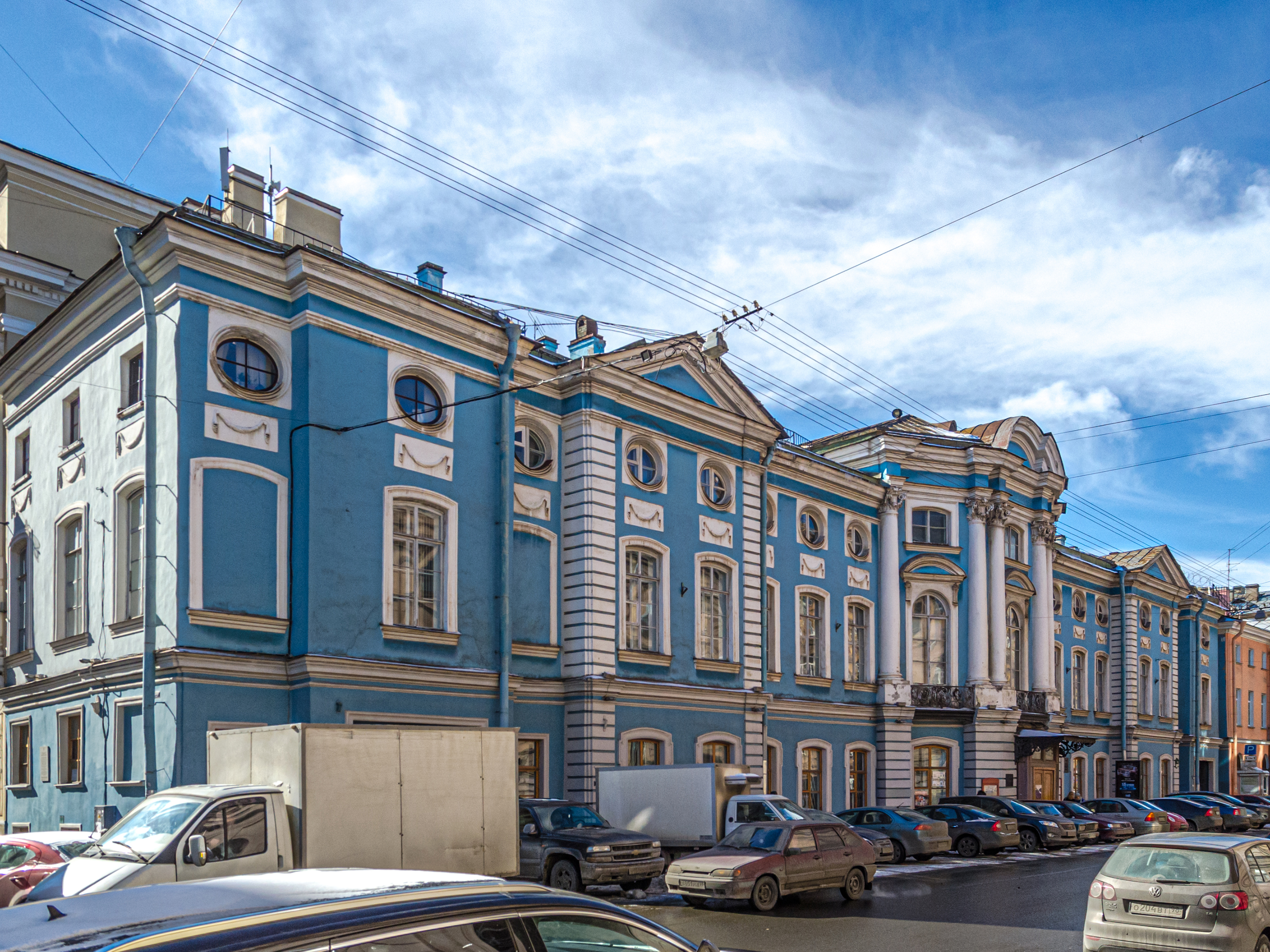
- The Shuvalov Mansion was the ministry's headquarters in Saint Petersburg

Agency overview
- Formed: September 8, 1802
- Preceding agency: Order of the Great Treasury
- Dissolved: March 15, 1917
- Superseding agency: Ministry of Justice of the Provisional Government
- Jurisdiction: Russia
- Headquarters: 59°56′05″N 30°20′33″E
- Parent agency: Council of Ministers

Ministry of Justice of the Russian Empire (Russian: Министерство юстиции Российской империи) was one of the Russian Empire's central public institutions and was established on 8 September 1802. The ministry was headed by the Minister of Justice (who was at the same time the Senate Procurator General) and was subordinated to the Council of Ministers of the Russian Empire

== Structure ==
- A Board of Consultation for the cases brought from the Senate before the Minister of Justice as Procurator General.
- First Department.
- Second Department.
- The Office of Surveys and the Surveying Institute (since 1870).
- Imperial School of Jurisprudence.
- Moscow Archives of the Ministry of Justice.
- The Council on Prison Affairs and the Chief Prisons Office (since 1895, transferred from Ministry of Interior).

== See also ==
- List of Justice Ministers of Imperial Russia

== Sources ==
- Statesman handbook for Russia. 1896.
- Encyclopedia of St. Petersburg
