= List of finance ministers of Russia =

This is a list of ministers of finance of Russia.

Dates before 15 February 1918 are given in the Old Style.

== Russian Empire ==
Minister	Term of office	
Count; Alexey Vasilyev	8 September 1802	15 August 1807
Fyodor Golubtsov	26 August 1807	1 January 1810
Count; Dmitry Guriev	1 January 1810	22 April 1823
Count; Egor Kankrin	22 April 1823	1 May 1844
Count; Fyodor Vronchenko	1 May 1844	6 April 1852
Peter Brock	9 April 1852	23 March 1858
Alexander Knyazhevich	23 March 1858	23 January 1862
Mikhail von Reutern	23 January 1862	7 July 1878
Samuil Greig	7 July 1878	27 October 1880
Alexander Abaza	27 October 1880	6 May 1881
Nikolay Bunge	6 May 1881	31 December 1886
Ivan Vyshnegradsky	1 January 1887	30 August 1892
Count; Sergei Witte	30 August 1892	16 August 1903
Eduard Pleske	16 August 1903	4 February 1904
Count; Vladimir Kokovtsov	5 February 1904	24 October 1905
Ivan Shipov	28 October 1905	24 April 1906
Count; Vladimir Kokovtsov	26 April 1906	30 January 1914
Pyotr Bark	30 January 1914	28 February 1917

== Provisional Government ==
Minister	Political party	Term of office		Cabinet
Mikhail Tereshchenko	Independent	2 March 1917	5 May 1917	Lvov
Andrey Shingarev	Constitutional Democratic Party	5 May 1917	2 July 1917	Lvov
Alexander Khrushchov (acting)	Constitutional Democratic Party	11 July 1917	24 July 1917	Kerensky I
Nikolay Nekrasov	Radical Democratic Party	25 July 1917	31 August 1917	Kerensky I
Mikhail Bernatsky	Radical Democratic Party	2 September 1917	25 October 1917	Kerensky II

== Russian SFSR ==
=== People's Commissars of Finance ===
Commissar	Political party	Term of office	
Ivan Skvortsov-Stepanov	Social Democratic Labour Party (Bolshevik)	27 October 1917	30 October 1917
Vyacheslav Menzhinsky	Communist Party	30 October 1917	9 April 1918
Isidore Gukovsky	Communist Party	9 April 1918	16 August 1918
Nikolay Krestinsky	Communist Party	16 August 1918	7 April 1922
Grigori Sokolnikov	Communist Party	7 April 1922	6 July 1923
Miron Vladimirov	Communist Party	7 July 1923	29 December 1924
Nikolay Milyutin	Communist Party	29 December 1924	21 December 1929
Varvara Yakovleva	Communist Party	21 December 1929	12 September 1937
Nikolay Sokolov (acting)	Communist Party	12 September 1937	31 January 1938
Vasily Popov	Communist Party	7 February 1938	20 April 1939
Mikhail Umnov	Communist Party	20 April 1939	30 September 1939
Arseny Safronov	Communist Party	23 October 1939	28 March 1941
Alexey Poskonov	Communist Party	28 March 1941	18 July 1945
Arseny Safronov	Communist Party	18 July 1945	23 March 1946

=== Ministers of Finance ===
Minister	Political party	Term of office	
Arseny Safronov	Communist Party	23 March 1946	12 July 1949
Ivan Fadeev	Communist Party	12 July 1949	9 March 1973
Andrey Bobrovnikov	Communist Party	9 March 1973	10 May 1990
Boris Fyodorov	Communist Party	14 July 1990	28 December 1990
Igor Lazarev	Communist Party	28 December 1990	11 November 1991

=== Minister of Economy and Finance ===
Minister	Political party	Term of office		Cabinet
Yegor Gaidar	Independent	11 November 1991	25 December 1991	Yeltsin–Gaidar

== Russian Federation ==
=== Minister of Economy and Finance ===
Minister	Political party	Term of office		Cabinet
Yegor Gaidar	Independent	25 December 1991	19 February 1992	Yeltsin–Gaidar

=== Ministers of Finance ===
Minister	Political party	Term of office		Cabinet
Yegor Gaidar	Independent	19 February 1992	2 April 1992	Yeltsin–Gaidar
Vasily Barchuk	Independent	2 April 1992	25 March 1993	Yeltsin–Gaidar
Vasily Barchuk	Independent	2 April 1992	25 March 1993	Chernomyrdin I
Boris Fyodorov	Independent	25 March 1993	26 January 1994	Chernomyrdin I
Sergey Dubinin (acting)	Independent	26 January 1994	12 October 1994	Chernomyrdin I
Andrey Vavilov (acting)	Independent	12 October 1994	4 November 1994	Chernomyrdin I
Vladimir Panskov	Independent	4 November 1994	15 August 1996	Chernomyrdin I
Alexander Livshits	Independent	15 August 1996	17 March 1997	Chernomyrdin II
Anatoly Chubais	Democratic Choice	17 March 1997	20 November 1997	Chernomyrdin II
Mikhail Zadornov	Independent	20 November 1997	25 May 1999	Chernomyrdin II
Mikhail Zadornov	Independent	20 November 1997	25 May 1999	Kiriyenko
Mikhail Zadornov	Independent	20 November 1997	25 May 1999	Primakov
Mikhail Kasyanov	Independent	25 May 1999	18 May 2000	Stepashin
Mikhail Kasyanov	Independent	25 May 1999	18 May 2000	Putin I
Alexey Kudrin	Independent	18 May 2000	26 September 2011	Kasyanov
Alexey Kudrin	Independent	18 May 2000	26 September 2011	Fradkov I
Alexey Kudrin	Independent	18 May 2000	26 September 2011	Fradkov II
Alexey Kudrin	Independent	18 May 2000	26 September 2011	Zubkov
Alexey Kudrin	Independent	18 May 2000	26 September 2011	Putin II
Anton Siluanov	United Russia	26 September 2011	Incumbent	Putin II
Anton Siluanov	United Russia	26 September 2011	Incumbent	Medvedev I
Anton Siluanov	United Russia	26 September 2011	Incumbent	Medvedev II
Anton Siluanov	United Russia	26 September 2011	Incumbent	Mishustin I
Anton Siluanov	United Russia	26 September 2011	Incumbent	Mishustin II

== See also ==
- Finance Minister
- Russian Council of Ministers
- Russian Provisional Government
