= Shipov =

Shipov (Russian: Шипов, from шип meaning thorn) is a Russian masculine surname having a feminine counterpart called Shipova. It may refer to:

- Dmitry Shipov (1851–1920), Russian politician;
- Ivan Shipov (1865–1919), Russian politician;
- Maxim Shipov (born 1987), Russian-Israeli figure skater; and
- Sergei Shipov (born 1966), Russian chess grandmaster.
