= Alexander Bulygin =

Russian politician

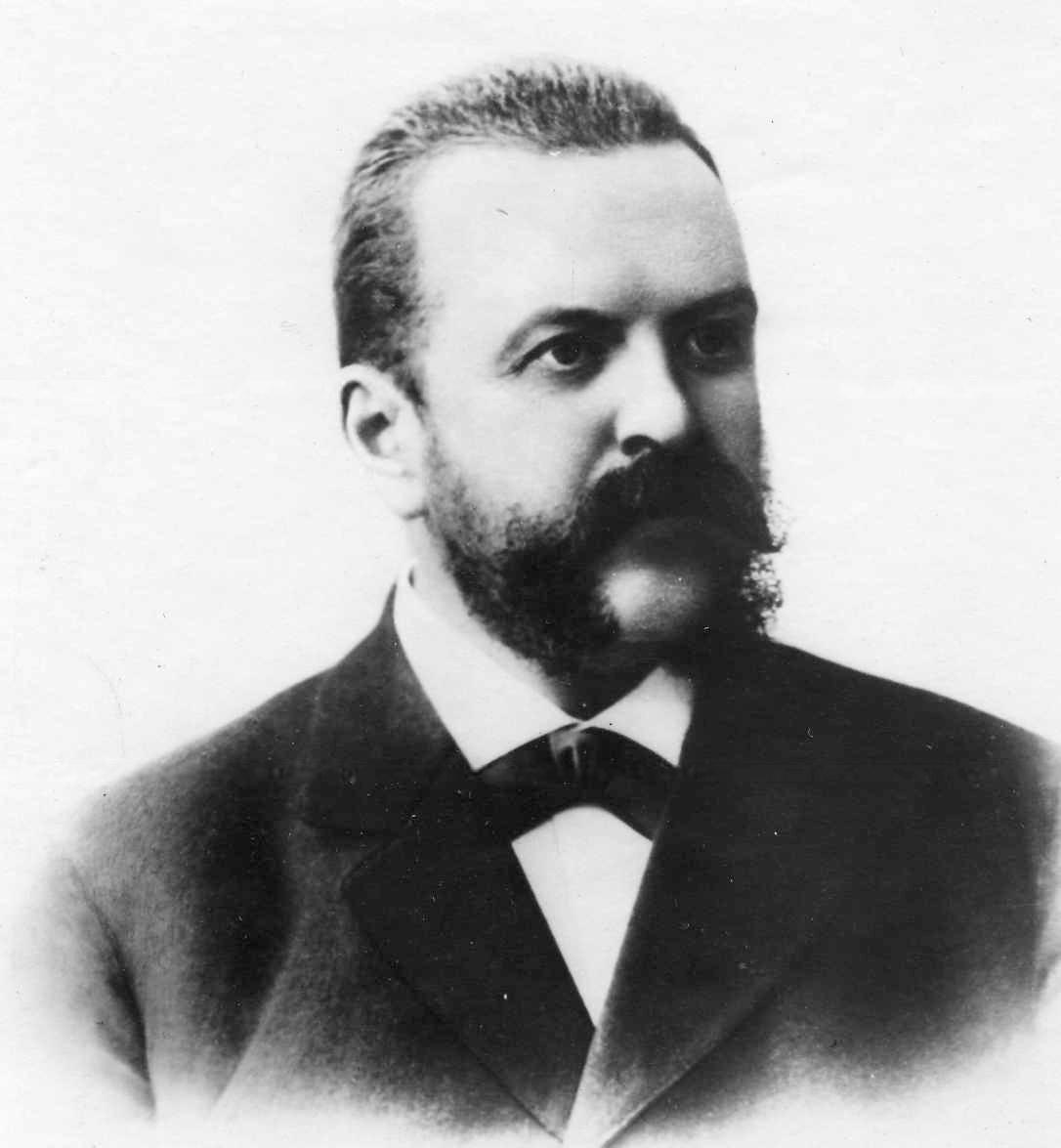
Alexander Bulygin

Alexander Grigoryevich Bulygin (Russian: Алекса́ндр Григо́рьевич Булы́гин; 18 August [O.S. 6 August] 1851 – 5 September 1919) was the Minister of Interior of Russia from February 1905 until October 1905.

== Biography ==
Graduate of the Imperial School of Law, he began work in the Tambov district court in 1871. He then held various administrative offices including that of Governor of Kaluga (1887), of Moscow (1893), and assistant to the Governor-General of Moscow, Grand Duke Sergei Alexandrovich (1902).

Bulygin replaced Prince Pyotr Dmitrievich Svyatopolk-Mirsky on 20 January 1905 after strikes and protests in January. He was assisted by General Dmitri Feodorovich Trepov. Bulygin is most notable for the so-called 'Bulygin Constitution', developed in response to the 1905 Russian Revolution. Tentative proposals were made in February already. It was issued on 6 August 1905, and proposed a purely advisory Duma. According to his Memoirs Sergei Witte did not force the Tsar to sign this Manifesto; moreover he states nobody knew who wrote the Manifesto. Witte suggests a member of the Black Hundreds. The Tsar had no other choice than to accept the rescript, written by Bulygin. It did not satisfy those who wanted a fully legislative assembly, and Bulygin's opponents, discontented, advocated the strikes of September and October. After these events, Bulygin (and Trepov) were sacked on 17 October 1905 and replaced by the reactionary Pyotr Nikolayevich Durnovo. After resignation Bulygin returned to the State Council.

He was shot and killed by Bolsheviks on 5 September 1919. The Ryazan Cheka were responsible.

Preceded by Prince Pyotr Dmitrievich Sviatopolk-Mirskii	Minister of Interior; February 1905 – 17 October 1905	Succeeded by Pyotr Nikolayevich Durnovo
