= Pyotr Nikolayevich Durnovo =

Russian lawyer and politician (1845–1915)

Pyotr Durnovo
- Пётр Дурновo
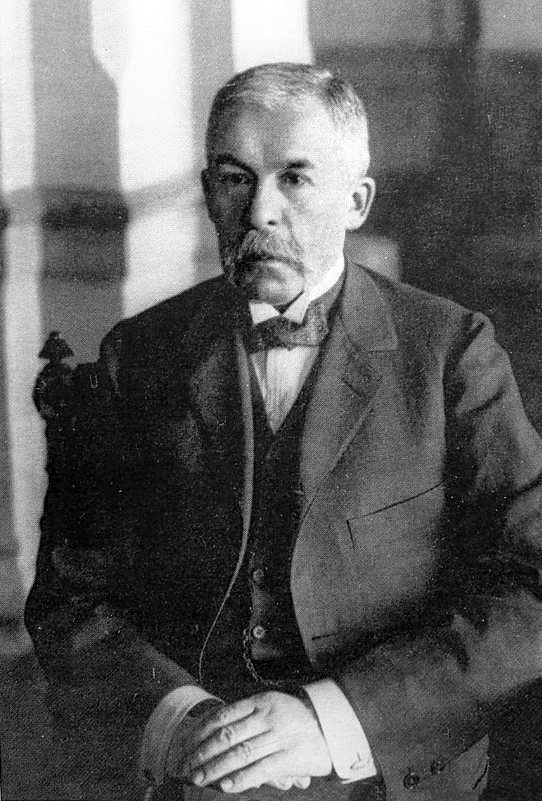
- Born: 1845; Moscow Governorate, Russia
- Died: 1915 (aged 69–70); Petrograd, Russia
- Occupation: Civil servant

Pyotr Nikolaevich Durnovo (Russian: Пётр Никола́евич Дурновó; 1845 – 24 September [O.S. 11 September] 1915) was a Russian lawyer, administrator and politician. He was a member of the House of Durnovo. He was known by revolutionaries during the period of the Russian Revolution of 1905 as "the counter-revolution's butcher."

== Biography ==
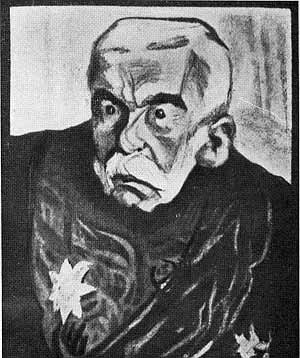
Cartoon by Zinovii Grzhebin, 1906

Pyotr Durnovo was born in Moscow Governorate to the noble Durnovo family in 1845.

Durnovo began his career in the naval and military service, transferring in 1881 to the Police Department of the Ministry of Internal Affairs, and from 1884 to 1893 was that department's director. He went on to high posts in other parts of the same ministry, including a short term as its head (1905–1906). His principal position during the last decade of his was that of member of the State Council.

A graduate of the Naval Cadet Corps and the Alexander Military Law Academy, he served in the Ministry of Justice reaching the position of Assistant Procurator of the Kiev Court of Appeals, until transferring to the Ministry of the Interior in 1881. Durnovo was appointed Director of Police in 1884 and remained in that position until 1893 when he was forced to resign due to a disagreement between himself and the Spanish Ambassador to Russia involving the misuse of police powers. He was appointed to the Imperial Russian Governing Senate in 1893 where he distinguished himself. In 1900, he was appointed Assistant Minister of the Interior in charge of Posts and Telegraph services at the request of Sipiagin. He remained in this position until 1905 when he was appointed Minister of the Interior, on Witte's recommendation.

In his book on the Russian Revolution of 1905, the Bolshevik revolutionary Leon Trotsky describes Durnovo's appointment by Witte to the post in a very negative light, calling him the "counter-revolution's butcher."

Durnovo led campaigns against the freedom of the press during the 1905 Russian Revolution.

Immediately after the end of the final session of the Second Peasants' Congress of 1905, held in Moscow from 6–12 November, Durnovo, intent on crushing the resistance of the revolutionaries, issued orders for killing resisters.

He retired from the position of minister shortly after Witte's resignation from the Chairmanship of the Council of Ministers despite earlier differences between the two.

=== A letter to Nicholas II ===
Durnovo was noted for his outspoken opposition to closer ties with the United Kingdom at the expense of relations with Germany which he expressed in his letter sent to Nicholas II in February 1914. In the letter, Durnovo has set out his views and which were to be realized in the aftermath of World War I. He believed that German and Russian interests were complementary while a war between the two empires could result only in the destruction of the existing political orders of both. Durnovo foresaw an imminent war between Russia, France and Great Britain against Germany, Austria-Hungary, and Turkey; he predicted that irredentism would make Italy stay neutral or join the Russo-Franco-British side despite its commitment to the other. His memorandum was found amongst the papers of Emperor Nicholas following the February Revolution of 1917.

== Death ==
Pyotr Durnovo died in September 1915 at his villa in Petrograd, from natural causes.

== Notes ==
Preceded by Alexander Bulygin	Minister of the Interior; October 1905 – April 1906	Succeeded by Pyotr Stolypin
