= Peter Brock (statesman) =

Russian Imperial finance minister

Peter Fyodorovich Brock Пётр Фёдорович Брок
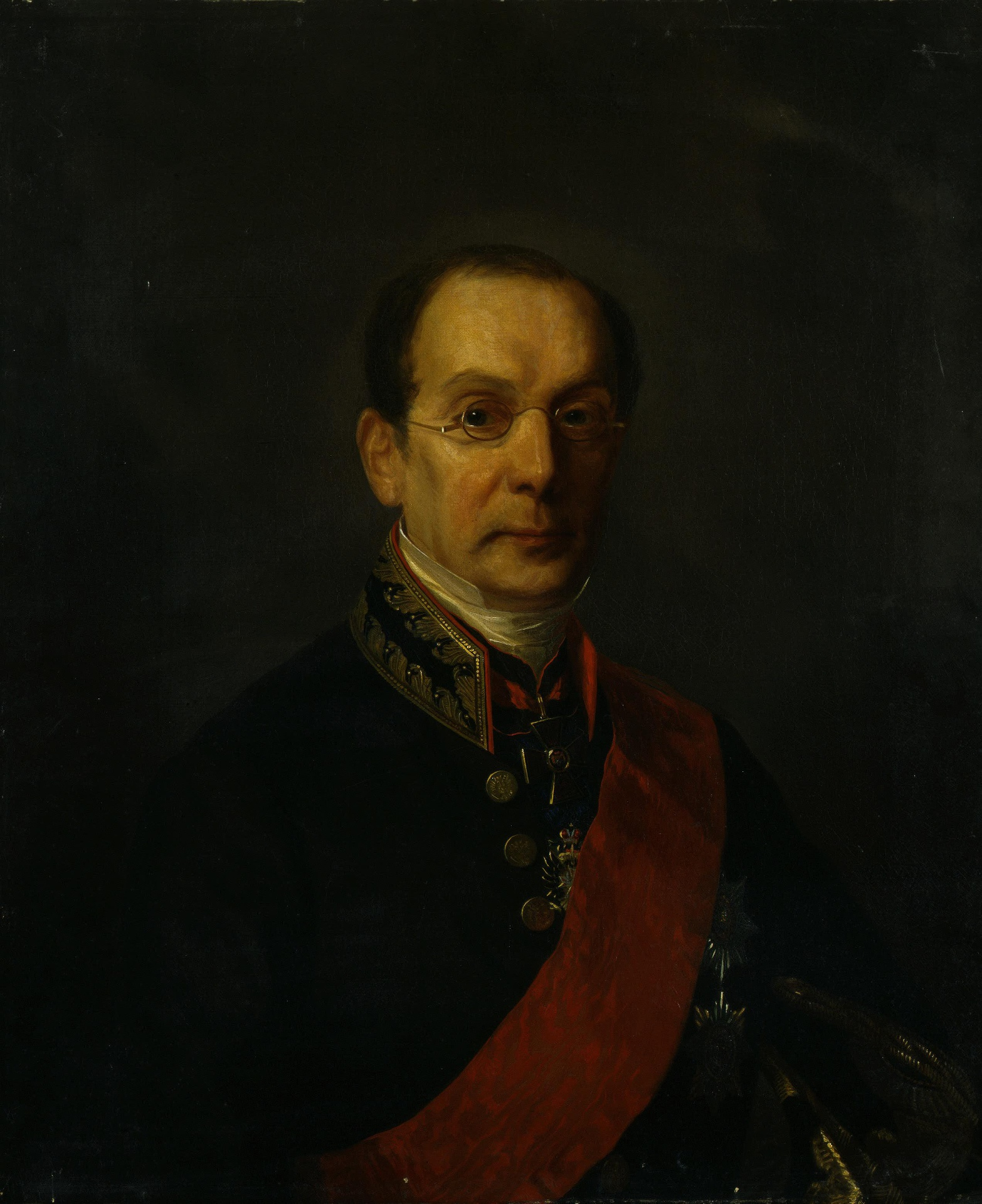

Minister of Finance
- In office 9 April 1852 – 23 March 1858
- Monarchs: Nicholas I Alexander II
- Preceded by: Fyodor Vronchenko
- Succeeded by: Alexander Knyazhevich

Personal details
- Born: 20 August 1805 Moscow, Russian Empire
- Died: 30 January 1875 (aged 69) Saint Petersburg, Russian Empire

Peter Fyodorovich Brock (Russian: Пётр Фёдорович Брок; 20 August 1805 – 30 January 1875) was a Baltic German statesman in the Russian Empire who served as Minister of Finance from 1852 to 1858, during the reigns of Nicholas I and Alexander II. In 1857, Brock was appointed to the secret committee to consider emancipation reform.
