= Georg Ludwig Cancrin =

Russian German aristocrat and politician (1774–1845)

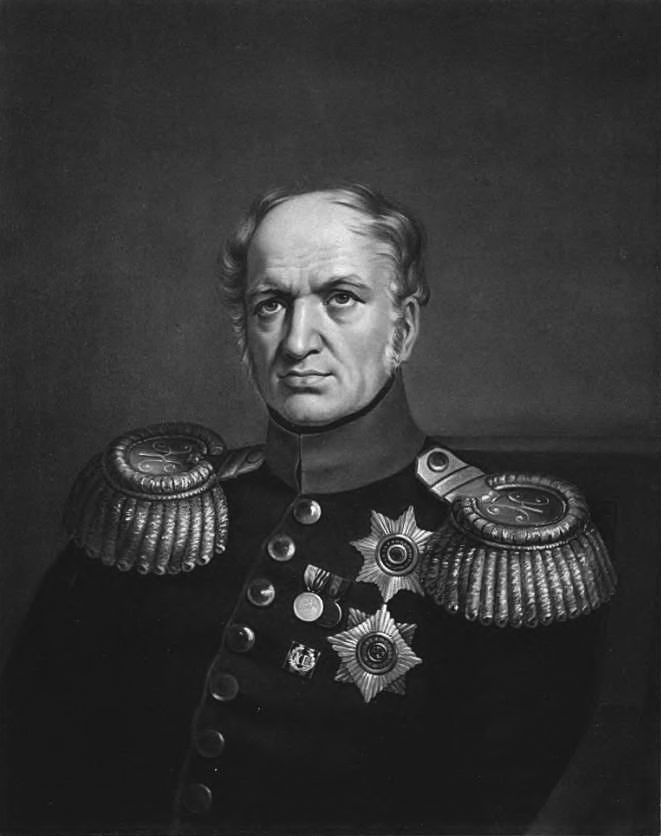

Minister of Finance
- In office April 22, 1823 – May 1, 1844 (O.S.)
- Monarchs: Alexander I Nicholas I
- Preceded by: Dmitry Guriev
- Succeeded by: Fyodor Vronchenko

Personal details
- Born: November 16, 1774 Hanau, Hesse-Hanau, Holy Roman Empire
- Died: September 10, 1845 (aged 70) Pavlovsk, Saint Petersburg, Russian Empire

Count Georg Ludwig Cancrin (Russian: Егор Францевич Канкрин, romanized: Yegor Frantsevich Kankrin; 16 November 1774 – 10 September 1845) was a Russian German aristocrat and politician best known for spearheading reforms in the Russian financial system early in the 19th century.

== Early life ==
Cancrin was born in Hanau, where his father Franz Ludwig von Cancrin was successively professor of mathematics at the military academy, head of the civil engineering department of the state, director of the theatre, and from 1774 master of the mint.

Between 1790 and 1794 the young Cancrin studied legal and political science at Giessen and Marburg, and after finishing his studies he entered the government service of Anhalt-Bernburg, a principality of the Holy Roman Empire. In 1797, at the age of 23, he accompanied his father to Russia, joining the imperial service and changing the form of his first name from Georg to Egor (or Yegor).

== Career ==
Cancrin rose slowly in the government service of the Russian Empire, and in 1823, at the age of 49, he was appointed as Minister of Finance, an office he held for 21 years. As a politician, Cancrin was a conservative who opposed the construction of railways.

In 1827, Cancrin wrote Alexander von Humboldt, the famous Prussian scientist, asking if he would visit Russia at the monarchy's expense to identify areas where Russia could develop economically. Although Russia had played a major role in defeating the armies of Napoleon, in the postwar period Russia's position in the world had not risen, and potentially Humboldt's visit could identify mining areas to exploit. The Russian government had already invited experts in mining from Germany and France for this task, perhaps not surprising since Cancrin's father, a mining expert himself, had come to Russia for similar reasons. From April to December 1829, Humboldt traveled through Russia, reaching the Chinese border in the east and the Caspian Sea in the south, before returning to St Petersburg. Cancrin had taken pains to guarantee the success of Humboldt's trip, arranging for his expenses to be paid as well as assuring the cooperation of Russian officialdom. "I shall not fail to send instructions to all governors and mining officials, with orders to put you up. Customs will be instructed to facilitate your entry into Russia." Humboldt accurately predicted that diamonds would be found in the Ural Mountains. Cancrin had initially contacted Humboldt to get his opinion about the feasibility of using Russian platinum in coinage. Humboldt recommended against it.

In 1839 cancrinite, named after the Minister of Finance, was found in the Ural Mountains.

Cancrin's policies often sought to maintain the status quo due to the limitations of the Russian government in carrying out large scale economic reform. His policies have been characterized as being aimed at reducing budget deficits through curtailment of government expenditure rather than attempts at stimulating the economy. He advanced loans to the landed gentry in order to preserve, in the words of the historian Walter Pintner, "the social status quo". With a view toward limiting state expenditure, he refused to credit the Russian industry, thus eliminating the budget deficits that plagued the Russian economy for decades. Private banks were also forbidden.

Cancrin's major achievement was the monetary reform of 1839–1843, which stabilized the Russian fiscal system. The reform started with the issue of a new silver ruble equal to 3.5 of the older Assignation rubles. Then, based on the silver rubles, new deposit notes were issued. Finally, the old Assignation rubles were removed from circulation in 1843, and replaced with the new banknotes. These reforms stabilized the Russian financial system considerably.

Having retired in 1844, Cancrin died in Pavlovsk, Saint Petersburg, in September 1845.

== Author ==
As a young man Cancrin wrote a novel, Dagobert: Geschichte aus dem jetzigen Freiheitskriege ("Dagobert: History of the current War of Freedom"), which was published in Altona, Hamburg, in 1797.

Among Cancrin's writings, The Military Economy (also published in German) is the best regarded.

== See also ==
- List of finance ministers of Russia

Preceded by Dmitry Guriev	Finance Minister; 1823–1844	Succeeded by Fyodor Vronchenko
