= Eduard Pleske =

Russian politician (1852–1904)

- Эдуард Плеске
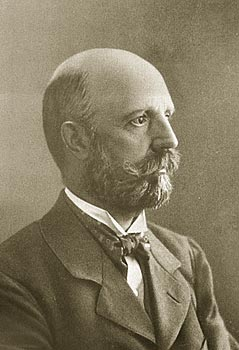

Finance Minister of Russia
- In office 18 August 1903 – 4 February 1904
- Monarch: Nicholas II
- Preceded by: Sergei Witte
- Succeeded by: Vladimir Kokovtsov

Personal details
- Born: 6 November 1852
- Died: 9 May 1904 (aged 51)
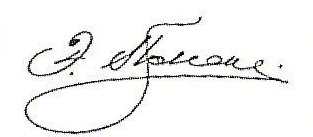
- Signature

Eduard Dmitrievich Pleske (Russian: Эдуард Дмитриевич Плеске; 6 November [O.S. 25 October] 1852 – 9 May [O.S. 26 April] 1904) was a Russian statesman of German origin.

== Career ==
Eduard Pleske was born into a noble family in the Russian Empire. He was educated in the Imperial Alexander Lyceum. After graduation, he joined the Ministry of Finance. Pleske was Assistant Director and later Director of the Special Credit Office.

Eduard Pleske also held the position of Head of the State Bank of the Russian Empire, and his signature can be seen on many Russian banknotes dated 1895–1899.

He was appointed Assistant Minister of Finance under Sergei Witte in 1903. He succeeded Witte on 16 August 1903 after Witte was shunted aside to the position of Chairman of the Committee of Ministers. He died in office on 4 February 1904. He was also briefly a member of the Imperial State Council in 1904.

Eduard Pleske published in 1885, Reference Guide to Tax collectors, State Chambers and Treasuries.

== Sources ==
- "Плеске, Эдуард Дмитриевич" . Brockhaus and Efron Encyclopedic Dictionary (in Russian). 1906.

Government offices
Preceded by Yuliy Zhukovskiy	Governor of the State Bank of the Russian Empire; 1894–1903	Succeeded by Sergei Timashev
Political offices
Preceded by Sergei Witte	Finance Minister; 1903–1904	Succeeded by Vladimir Kokovtsov
