= Nikolai von Bunge =

Russian academic and statesman (1823–1895)

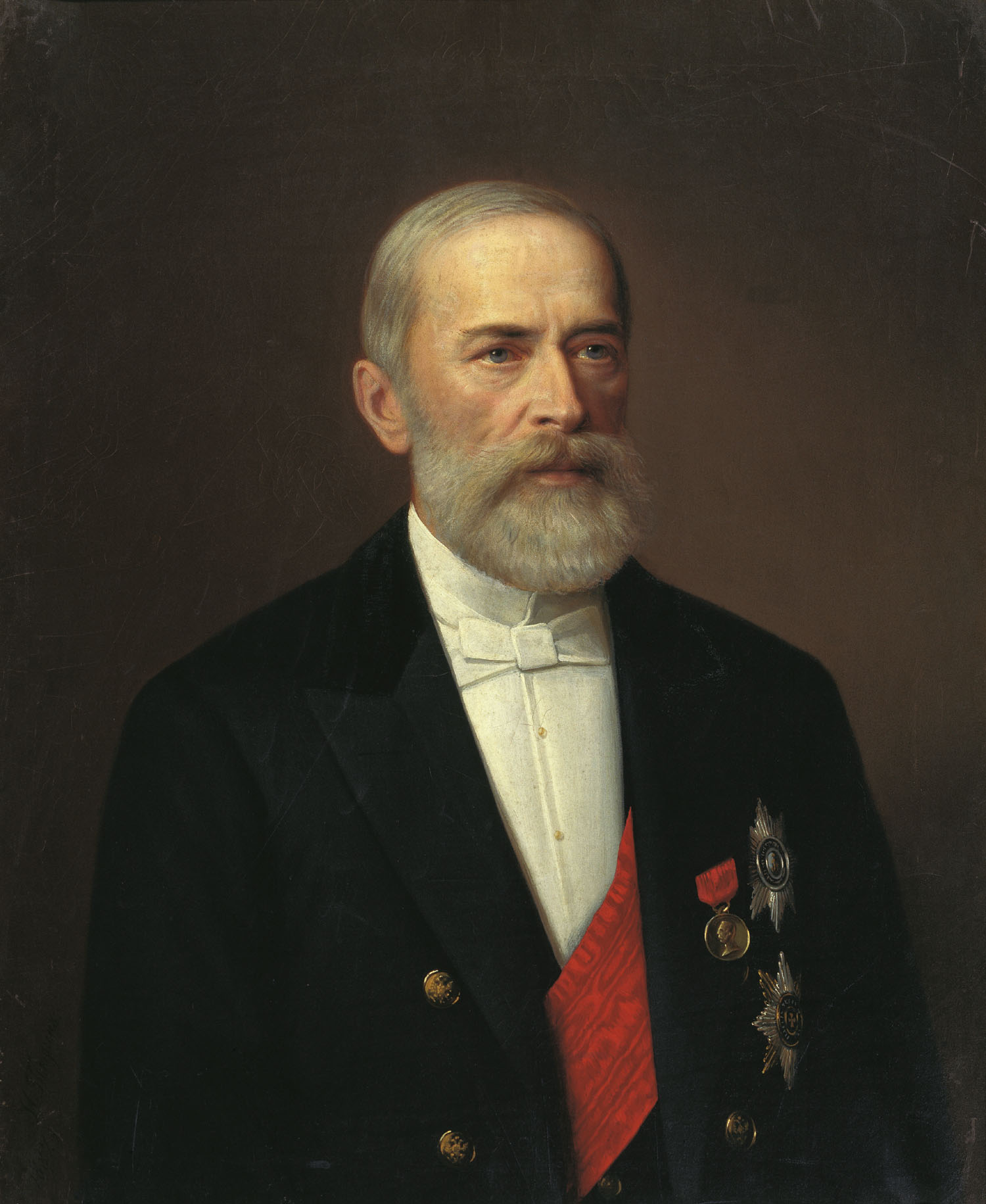
- Portrait by Ivan Tyurin, 1887

Chairman of the Committee of Ministers of the Russian Empire
- In office 31 December [O.S. 19 December] 1886 – 15 June [O.S. 3 June] 1895
- Monarch: Alexander III
- Preceded by: Michael von Reutern
- Succeeded by: Ivan Durnovo

Minister of Finance
- In office 7 July [O.S. 25 June] 1881 – 31 December [O.S. 19 December] 1886
- Monarch: Alexander III
- Preceded by: Alexander Abaza
- Succeeded by: Ivan Vyshnegradsky
Senior sport offices
Deputy Minister of Finance
In office
27 October [O.S. 15 October] 1880 – 27 April [O.S. 15 April] 1881

Rector of St. Vladimir Imperial Kiev University
- In office 1859–1880
- Monarch: Alexander II
- Preceded by: Aleksandr Matveyev
- Succeeded by: Konstantin Feofilaktov

Personal details
- Born: 23 November [O.S. 11 November] 1823 Kiev, Russian Empire
- Died: 14 June [O.S. 2 June] 1895 (aged 71) Tsarskoye Selo, Saint Petersburg Governorate, Russian Empire
- Education: St. Vladimir Imperial University
- Occupation: Statesman; economist; politician; rector; academic

Nikolai Karl Paul von Bunge, known in Russian as Nikolai Khristianovich Bunge (Note: In this name that follows East Slavic naming customs, the patronymic is Khristianovich and the family name is Bunge.) (Russian: Николай Христианович Бунге; 23 November [O.S. 11 November] 1823 – 15 June [O.S. 3 June] 1895), was a Russian economist, academic and statesman who served as the minister of finance of the Russian Empire from 1881 to 1886. An economic liberal, he became known as the preeminent architect of Russian capitalism under the reign of Alexander III.

== Early life (1823–1847) ==
Bunge was born on 23 November [O.S. 11 November] 1823 in Kiev, in the Russian Empire, in a family of German origin. He was the second son of the physician Christian Gottlieb von Bunge, a specialist in pediatric diseases, and his second wife Katharina von Gebner. On his father's side of the family he was a descendent of the Lutheran Bunge family of East Prussian origin, and was a second generation of the Kievan branch. His grandfather, Georg Friedrich Bunge moved from the Stallupönen to Kiev sometime in the 18th century.

He graduated with a gold medal from the First Kiev Gymnasium and later completed the Faculty of Law at St. Vladimir University in 1845, earning a Candidate of Law degree.

In 1847, he obtained a Master’s degree in State Law with his dissertation A Study of the Principles of Peter the Great's Commercial Legislation. He earned a Doctorate in Political Science in 1850 with his dissertation The Theory of Credit.

== Academic career ==
=== Early years (1845–1859) ===
On 31 October 1845, Bunge began teaching laws of state administration at the Nizhyn Lyceum of Prince Bezborodko. He became a professor on 19 December 1847 and served until 31 October 1850, lecturing on finance and financial law. In 1850, he was also appointed acting adjunct professor at St. Vladimir University in the Department of Political Economy and Statistics. In 1852, he defended his dissertation On the Theory of Credit, earning a Doctorate in Political Science and was confirmed as an extraordinary professor. On March 26, 1854, he became an ordinary professor. In 1858, he also began lecturing on financial legislation at the university.

=== Later years (1859–1895) ===
On 4 December 1859, Bunge was elected a corresponding member of the Russian Academy of Sciences.

Bunge served his first tenure as rector of St. Vladimir Imperial University from 1859 to 1862. From 1863 to 1864, Bunge was the deputy grand tutor and thought financial theory and political economy to Tsarevich Nicholas Alexandrovich, the son of Alexander II. In 1869, he became an ordinary professor in the Department of Police Law at St. Vladimir University effectively teaching economic policy. Bunge served his second term as rector of his alma mater from 1870 to 1875, and a third term from 1878 to 1880 after which he took a break from academia.

He returned to academia in 1887 and lectured on political economy, statistics, and finance to Grand Duke Nicholas Alexandrovich, the future Emperor Nicholas II, until 1889.

On 13 March 1890, Bunge was appointed full academician in the section of historical and political sciences (political economy and statistics) of the Russian Academy of Sciences.

== Minister of Finance (1881–1886) ==
In addition to his academic career, he headed the Kiev branch of the State Bank of the Russian Empire and led the Kiev Mutual Credit Society. On 23 April 1861, he was granted the rank of Actual State Councillor.

Bunge was a professor of the St. Vladimir Imperial University until 1880, when he was summoned to St. Petersburg to become a deputy minister and then (since 1881) the minister of finance. Five years later, he became the chairman of the Committee of Ministers, the highest position in the civil administration of the Russian Empire. Bunge held this position until 1895.

Bunge undertook a number of reforms with the aim of modernizing the Russian economy. He consolidated the banking system of the Empire and founded the Peasants' Land Bank (1882) which helped peasants to purchase land. He introduced important tax law changes which seriously reduced the tax burden of the peasantry. The head tax was abolished and the inheritance tax was introduced.

Bunge's policies towards the Russian industries were extremely protectionist. He promoted the construction of railways and spearheaded the first Russian labour laws, some of them aimed at reducing child labour.

However, in 1886, under pressure of conservative deputies accusing him of incompetence and incapability to overcome the budgeted deficit, Bunge resigned.

== Sources ==
- Barnett, Vincent (2013). A History of Russian Economic Thought. Taylor & Francis. ISBN 9781134261918.

Political offices
Preceded by Aleksandr Abaza	Minister of Finance; 1881–1886	Succeeded by Ivan Vyshnegradsky
Preceded by Michael von Reutern	Chairman of the Committee of Ministers; 1887–1895	Succeeded by Ivan Durnovo
Educational offices
Preceded by Ernst Rudolf von Trautvetter	Rector of St. Vladimir Kiev University; 1859–1862	Succeeded by Mykola Ivanyshev
Preceded by Aleksandr Matveyev	Rector of St. Vladimir Kiev University; 1871–1875; 1878–1880	Succeeded by Aleksandr Matveyev
Preceded by Aleksandr Matveyev	Rector of St. Vladimir Kiev University; 1871–1875; 1878–1880	Succeeded by Konstantin Feofilaktov
