= The Big Man (1908 film) =

- Russian: Большой человек
- Directed by: Alexander Drankov
- Written by: I. I. Kolyshko (Note: Колышко Иосиф Иосифович (1861-1938))
- Produced by: Alexander Drankov
- Cinematography: Alexander Drankov
- Production company: A. Drankov's Atelier
- Release date: 1908
- Country: Russian Empire

The Big Man (Russian: Большой человек) is a 1908 Russian silent short film directed by Alexander Drankov. It is a lost film.

The film is a screen version of Kolyshko's play "The Big Man" performed by artists of the theatre of the St. Petersburg Nicholas II People's House.

== The play ==
The play (1908) was a political satire. Critics and the public perceived that it was targeting Sergei Witte, recognizable in V.A. Ishimov (Russian: В.А. Ишимов), the protagonist of the play. Answering to the censorship, the author did admit that he did use Witte's "outstanding features as a major personality", however he denied the intention to ridicule Witte. The scandalous interpretation widely discussed in press created a promotion for the play and resulted in its commercial success, performed in Moscow, St. Petersburg, as well as in provincial cities.
