= Franz Ludwig von Cancrin =

German architect and scientist (1738–1812)

Franz Ludwig von Cancrin (February 21, 1738 in Breidenbach – 1812) was a German mineralogist, metallurgist, architect and writer.

== Life ==
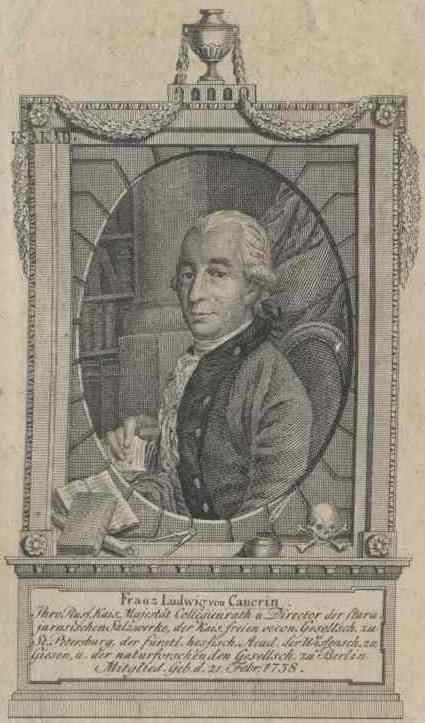
Franz Ludwig von Cancrin

He was born into a German mining family where he was trained by his father in the science of mining. In 1764, he entered the service of the landgrave of Hesse-Kassel at Hanau, becoming professor of mathematics at the military academy, head of the civil engineering department of the state, director of the theatre and (1774) of the mint. A work on the copper mines of Elesse (1767) earned him a European reputation, and in 1783 he accepted from Catherine II of Russia the directorship of the famous Staraya salt-works, living thenceforth in Russia.

In 1798 he became a councillor of state at St. Petersburg. He published many works on mineralogy and metallurgy, of which the most important, the Grundzüge der Berg- und Salzwerkskunde (12 vols, 1773–1791), has been translated into several languages.

His son, Count Georg von Cancrin, or Kankrin (1774–1845), was an eminent Russian minister of finance and the liaison with Alexander von Humboldt during his 1829 scientific expedition to Russia. The mineral of cancrinite is named after him.

== Main works ==
- Praktische Abhandlung von der Zubereitung der Kupfererze, Frankfurt, 1765
- Beschreibung der vorzüglichsten Bergwerke in Hessen, in dem Waldekkischen, an dem Haarz, in dem Mansfeldischen, in Chursachsen, und in dem Saalfeldischen. (1767)
- Erste Begriffe der unterirdischen Erdbeschreibung, Frankfurt, 1773
- Gründliche Anleitung zur Schmelzkunst und Metallurgie, 1784
- Stoische Sentenzen, Moralen und politische Einfälle etc., 1785
- Geschichte und systematische Beschreibung der in der Grafschaf Hanau Muenzenberg, in dem Amte Bieber und anderen Aemtern dieser Grafschaft benachbarten Laendern gelegenen Bergwerke. 1787.
- Grundzüge der Berg- und Salzwerkskunde. 12 vol. Frankfurt 1778–1791. (Vol. 5 available)
- A. Bayer's Bergstaatslehre, 1790.
- Von der Zubereitung des Roheisens zu Schmiedeeisen, 1790.
- Grundlehre der bürgerlichen Baukunst, 1790.
- Abhandlung von der Anlage, dem vorteilhaftesten Bau und der Unterhaltung der Rohrbrunnen, Frankfurt, 1791
- Einzelne Bauschriften, 2 vol., 1791–1792.
- Abhandlung von der vorteilhaften Grabung, der guten Fassung und dem rechten Gebrauch der süsen Brunnen, um reines und gesundes Wasser zu bekommen, Giessen 1792
- Abhandlung von der Bauung und Verwaltung der Höfe und Vorwerke, Giessen, 1792.
- Anleitung zu einer künstlichen und zwekmäßigen Wiesenwässerung mit Quell- Weg- Dorf- Stadt- Fluß- gesamletem Regen- und Seewasser: Mit einer Kupfertafel, Warburg, 1796.
- Bewährte Anweisung Schornsteine feuerfest zu bauen, wie auch Stubenöfen nach russischer Art zu verbessern, Leipzig 1797.
- Rechtliches Bedenken über die Regalität der Steinbrüche, Riga, 1797.
- Abhandlungen von dem Wasserrechte, sowohl dem natürlichen, als positiven, vornehmlich aber dem deutschen, Halle, 1789–1800.
- Wie man das beste Eisen erhalten kann, 1800.
- Vollständige Abhandlung von dem Theerbrennen in einem neuen mehr vollkommenen Theerofen worin man mit Scheidholz, Reisbunden, Torf und Stein kohlen feuern kann. Giessen 1805.

== Sources ==
- "Канкрин, Франц-Людвиг" . Brockhaus and Efron Encyclopedic Dictionary (in Russian). 1906.
