= Ivan Vyshnegradsky =

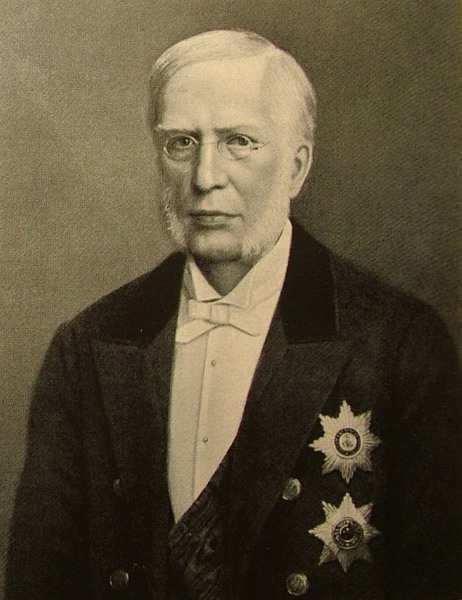
- Portrait, c. 1880–1885
- Born: Иван Алексеевич Вышнеградский; 1 January 1832; Vyshny Volochyok, Tver Governorate, Russian Empire
- Died: 6 April 1895 (aged 63); Saint Petersburg, Russian Empire

Ivan Alekseyevich Vyshnegradsky (Russian: Ива́н Алексе́евич Вышнегра́дский; 1 January 1832 – 6 April 1895) was a Russian financial adviser, priest and scientist who specialized in mechanics. He served as the Russian finance minister from 1887 to 1892.

== Early life ==
Born in a priest's family, Ivan Vyshnegradsky graduated from the Tver Theological Seminary and later from the Main Pedagogical Institute. He later taught maths and mechanics at St. Petersburg military educational institutions. He specialized in mechanics and among his contributions was a set of criteria for identifying the stability of steam engine speed governors. By the time he was appointed a government minister his fortune was nearly a million roubles due to his participation in several joint-stock companies as well as being a renowned and talented entrepreneur. In 1884 Ivan Vyshnegradsky became a member of the Council of Ministers of Public Instruction and drew up a program for technical education.

== Russian Finance Minister ==
In 1886 Ivan Vyshnegradsky was appointed a member of the State Council and in 1887 became the head of the Ministry of Finance. Similar to his predecessor Nikolai Bunge, Vyshnegradsky pursued a policy aimed at the settlement of the budget deficit, stronger government interference in private railways and the nationalisation of the least profitable railways as well as the support of domestic industry and preparation of monetary reform. Ivan Vyshnegradsky achieved this by; increasing direct taxes, pushing for an export drive and increasing railway lines. Although achieving a balanced budget, accumulating gold reserves and strengthening the rouble, Vyshnegradsky's work was criticised in light of his contradictory taxes on peasants leading to the Russian famine of 1891–92.

Political offices
Preceded by Nikolai Bunge	Finance Minister of Imperial Russia; 1887–1892	Succeeded by Sergei Witte
