= Fyodor Vronchenko =

Russian Imperial finance minister

Count Fyodor Pavlovich Vronchenko
- Фёдор Павлович Вронченко
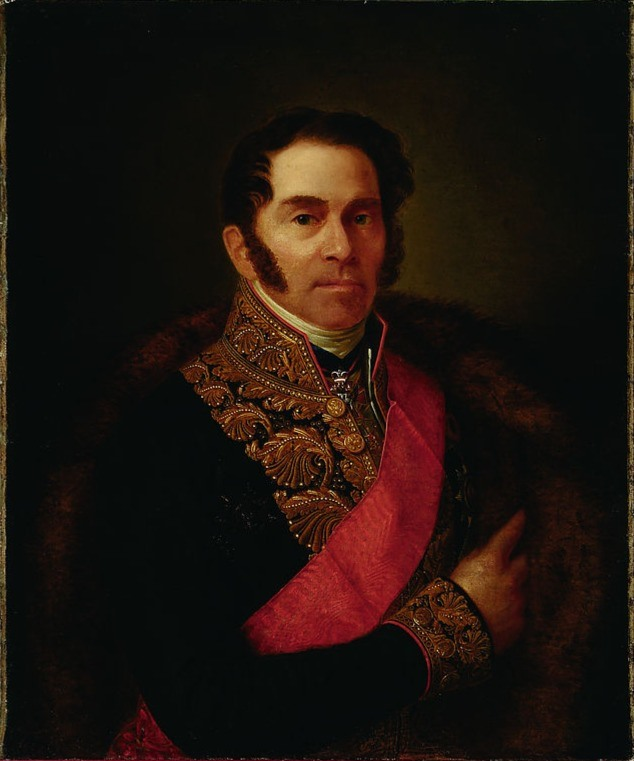

Minister of Finance
- In office 1 May 1844 – 6 April 1852
- Monarch: Nicholas I
- Preceded by: Georg von Cancrin
- Succeeded by: Peter Brock

Personal details
- Born: 1779 Kopys, Russian Empire
- Died: 6 April 1852 (aged 72–73) Saint Petersburg, Russian Empire

Count Fyodor Pavlovich Vronchenko (Russian: Фёдор Па́влович Вро́нченко; 1779 – 6 April 1852) was a Russian statesman who served as Minister of Finance from 1844 to 1852, during the reign of Nicholas I. Vronchenko urged caution regarding Russian policy in the Far East out of concern of complicating relations with China and Great Britain and a belief that Siberia was of little economic importance to the empire.
