= Vladimir Kokovtsov =

Prime Minister of the Russian Empire from 1911 to 1914

- Владимир Коковцов
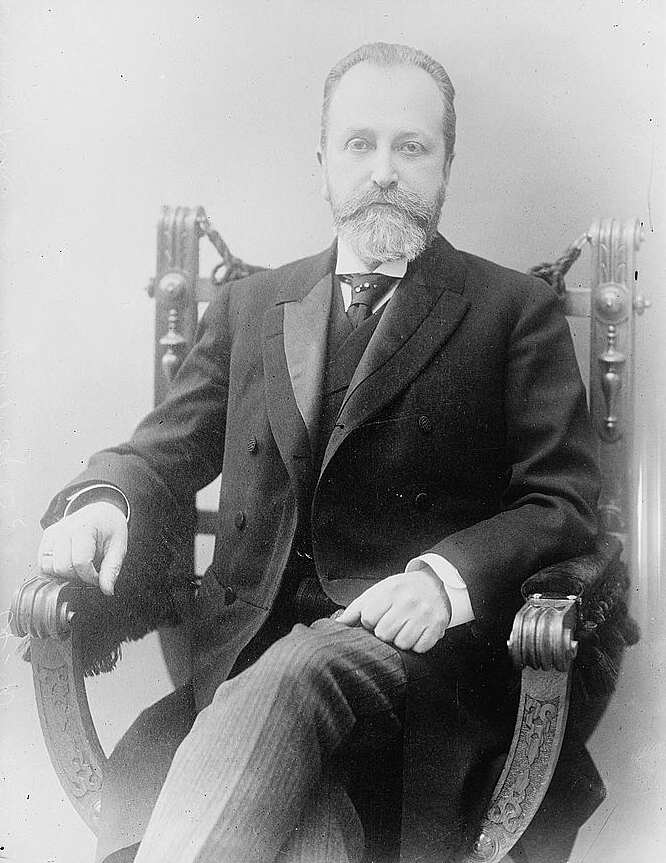
- Kokovtsov c. 1910–1915

4th Prime Minister of Russia
- In office 18 September 1911 – 30 January 1914
- Monarch: Nicholas II
- Preceded by: Pyotr Stolypin
- Succeeded by: Ivan Goremykin

Finance Minister of Russia
- In office 26 April 1906 – 30 January 1914
- Prime Minister: Ivan Goremykin; Pyotr Stolypin; Himself
- Preceded by: Ivan Shipov
- Succeeded by: Pyotr Bark
- In office 5 February 1904 – 24 October 1905
- Prime Minister: Sergei Witte
- Preceded by: Eduard Pleske
- Succeeded by: Ivan Shipov

Personal details
- Born: Vladimir Nikolayevich Kokovtsov; 18 April [O.S. 6 April] 1853 Borovichi, Borovichsky Uyezd, Russian Empire
- Died: 29 January 1943 (aged 89) Paris, France
- Education: Imperial Alexander Lyceum

Count Vladimir Nikolayevich Kokovtsov (Russian: Влади́мир Никола́евич Коко́вцов; 18 April [O.S. 6 April] 1853 – 29 January 1943) was a Russian politician who served as the fourth prime minister of Russia from 1911 to 1914, during the reign of Nicholas II.

== Early life ==
He was born in Borovichi, Borovichsky Uyezd, in the Novgorod Governorate on 18 April [O.S. 6 April] 1853.

Following graduation from the Imperial Alexander Lyceum in December 1872 Kokovtsov applied for admittance to Saint Petersburg State University to study law on the recommendation of Aleksandr Gradovsky, Nikolai Tagantsev and S. Pakhman, all notable legal authorities of the time. However, his father, who had promised to pay for his education suddenly died leaving the family in strained financial circumstances. As a result, instead of attending university he entered the civil service to provide him and his family an additional income.

== Civil service ==
Kokovtsov was admitted as a candidate for a civil service position in the Imperial Ministry of Justice serving first in the statistical, then the legislative and finally in the criminal office. From 1879 to 1890 he served as Senior Inspector and Assistant Head of the Central Administration of Prisons. This period is noted for its prison reforms formulated by State Secretary K.K. Grot, a senior member of the Imperial State Council. From 1890 to 1896, he served in the State Council as Assistant State Secretary, State Secretary and finally as Assistant Imperial Secretary where he worked primarily on matters reviewed by the Russian Imperial State Council's Department of State Economy.

From 1896 to 1902, he served in one of the three Assistant Minister of Finance positions under Sergei Witte.

After resigning from the position, he served as Imperial Secretary until his appointment as Minister of Finance in 1904.

He resigned the following year, when his former superior in the Finance Ministry, Witte, assumed the Chairmanship of the Council of Ministers. Although not a minister, he then played a substantial role in securing a loan that did nothing less than keep the imperial government from having to devalue its currency and leave the gold standard, then the basis of almost all financially stable, secure and modern countries. Kokovtsov returned as Minister of Finance in the cabinets of Ivan Goremykin (1906) and Peter Stolypin (1906–11). Kokovtsov was an anti-Semite who believed the problem with Jews was not their 'backwardness' but the fact that they were 'so clever'.

Kokovtsov succeeded Stolypin as Chairman of the Council of Ministers after Stolypin's assassination in 1911, while also maintaining his post as Minister of Finance, and held both offices until his retirement in 1914. Kokovtsov opposed the appointment of Alexei Khvostov.

In 1912, Kokovtsov asked the tsar to authorize Grigori Rasputin's exile to Tobolsk. Nicholas refused: "I know Rasputin too well to believe all the tittle-tattle about him." Kokovtsov had offered Rasputin a substantial amount of money to leave for Siberia and ordered the newspapers not to mention his name in connection with the Empress. The tsar dismissed Kokovtsov on 29 January 1914 for a "lack of control over the press".

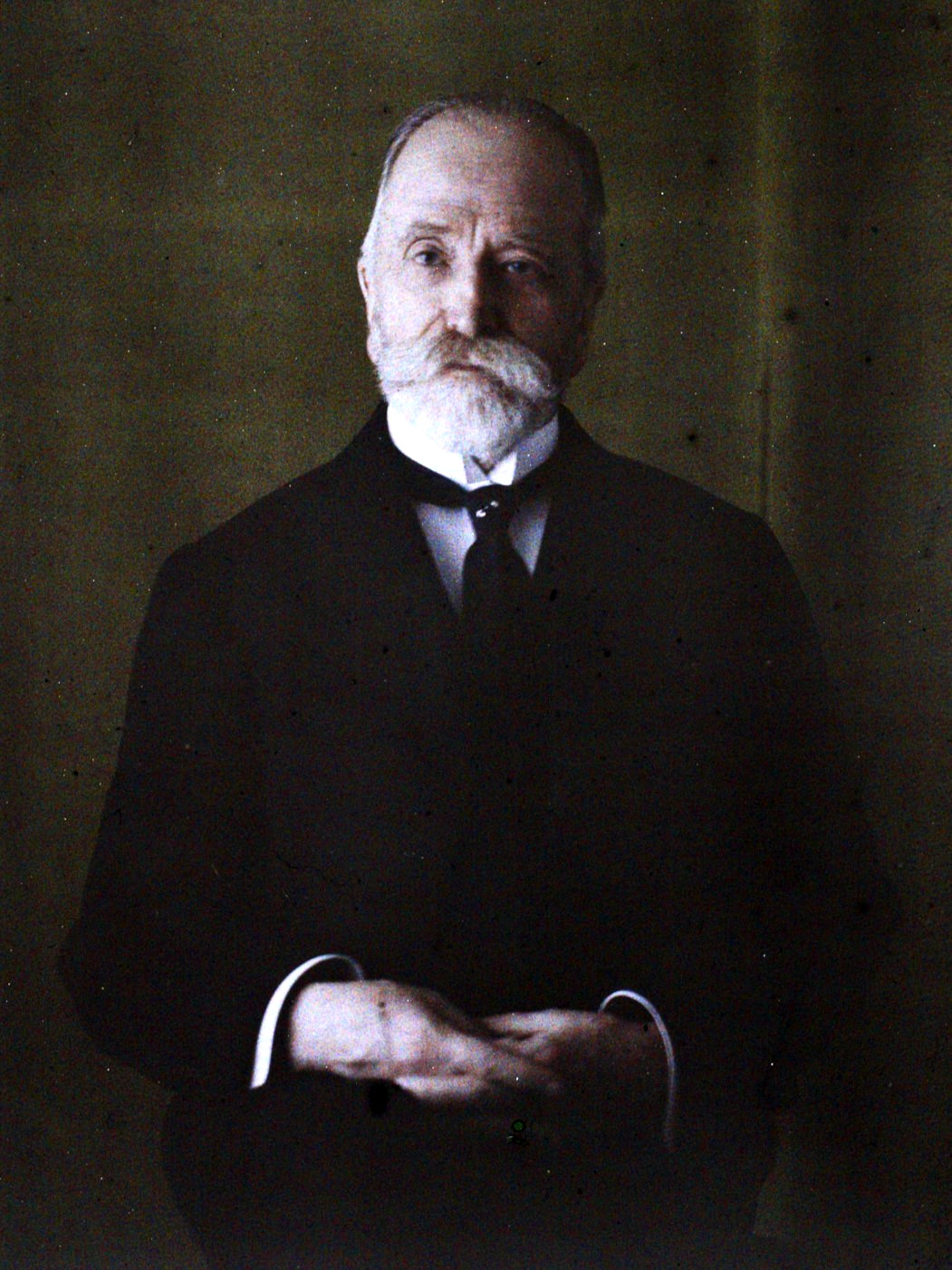
Autochrome portrait by Auguste Léon, 1927

In domestic policy, Kokovtsov's time as prime minister saw the passage of two laws in 1912 that provided accident and sickness insurance to about 20% of workers.

== Retirement and later life ==
Upon retiring, Kokovtsov was invested with the title and rank of count. After the February Revolution, he moved to Kislovodsk. After the October Revolution of 1917, he was investigated by the Cheka but escaped with his family to Finland and eventually settled in Paris. He was a leading figure in Russian émigré society until his death on 29 January 1943. In 1933, he published his memoirs, which describe his childhood and education as well as his early years in government service from 1903 to 1919.

== Relationship with Sergei Witte ==
Witte states in his autobiography that while Kokovtsov was serving as one of his assistants, he was left alone to do the business he knew so well and that Kokovtsov was the source of several small but meaningful reforms in the finances of the Russian Empire.

Much was made of Kokovtsov's differences with Witte which resulted in the two refusing to work with one another after 1905–06. The apparent cause of these differences were conflicts over courses of action in the preparation for peace talks with Japan, following the Russo-Japanese War; the changing of the government structure in the wake of widespread political unrest; Witte's opposition to several of Kokovtsov's policies as Minister of Finance during the Russo-Japanese War, and in an important loan negotiation that occurred in 1905–06. The differences were made public in the Council of State when one or the other would make comments in opposition to the other's viewpoint on various issues.

He was decorated with the Serbian Royal Order of the White Eagle, the Montenegrin Order of Prince Danilo I, and the Grand Cross of the Swedish Royal Order of the Polar Star (1897).

Political offices
Preceded by Petr Stolypin	Prime Minister of Russia; 18 September 1911 – 30 January 1914	Succeeded by Ivan Goremykin
Preceded by Eduard Pleske	Finance Minister; 1904–1905	Succeeded by Ivan Shipov
Preceded by Ivan Shipov	Finance Minister; 1906–1914	Succeeded by Pyotr Bark
