= Sidney Harcave =

Sidney S. Harcave (September 12, 1916 – October 24, 2008) was an American historian who specialised in Russian history.

He was born in Washington, D.C. and was educated at the City College of New York, where he graduated with a BA. Under the supervision of Samuel N. Harper at the University of CHicago, Harcave earned his PhD in 1943. During World War II, he became a foreign area specialist for the Foreign Broadcast Intelligence Service and an analyst for the Office of Strategic Services and the United States Department of State.

After the war, Harcave taught at the University of Wyoming and Champlain College. During 1950–1951, he was a member of the Harvard Refugee Interview Project, which gave him an insight into the Soviet regime. He used this information for his 1954 work, Structure and Functioning of the Lower Party Organizations in the Soviet Union. His college textbook, Russia: A History, was first published in 1952 and went through six editions.

From 1953 until 1982, he worked for the State University of New York, Binghamton. Harcave edited a collection of Russian primary sources, Readings in Russian History, which was published in two volumes in 1962. He wrote a history of the 1905 Russian Revolution, which was published in 1964, and he composed a history of the Russian Tsars from 1814 until 1917, which appeared in 1968. He edited and translated the memoirs of the Russian politician Sergei Witte, which was published in 1990, and he also wrote a biography of Witte.

== Works ==
- Russia: A History (Lippincott, 1952).
- Structure and Functioning of the Lower Party Organizations in the Soviet Union (Maxwell Air Force Base, 1954).
- (editor), Readings in Russian History, two volumes (Crowell, 1962).
- First Blood: The Russian Revolution of 1905 (Collier-Macmillan, 1964).
- Years of the Golden Cockerel: The Last Romanov Tsars, 1814–1917 (Robert Hale, 1968).
- (editor), Memoirs of Count Witte (M. E. Sharpe, 1990).
- Count Sergei Witte and the Twilight of Imperial Russia (M. E. Sharpe, 2004).
