= Sergei Witte =

Prime Minister of the Russian Empire from 1905 to 1906

Count Sergei Witte
- Сергей Витте
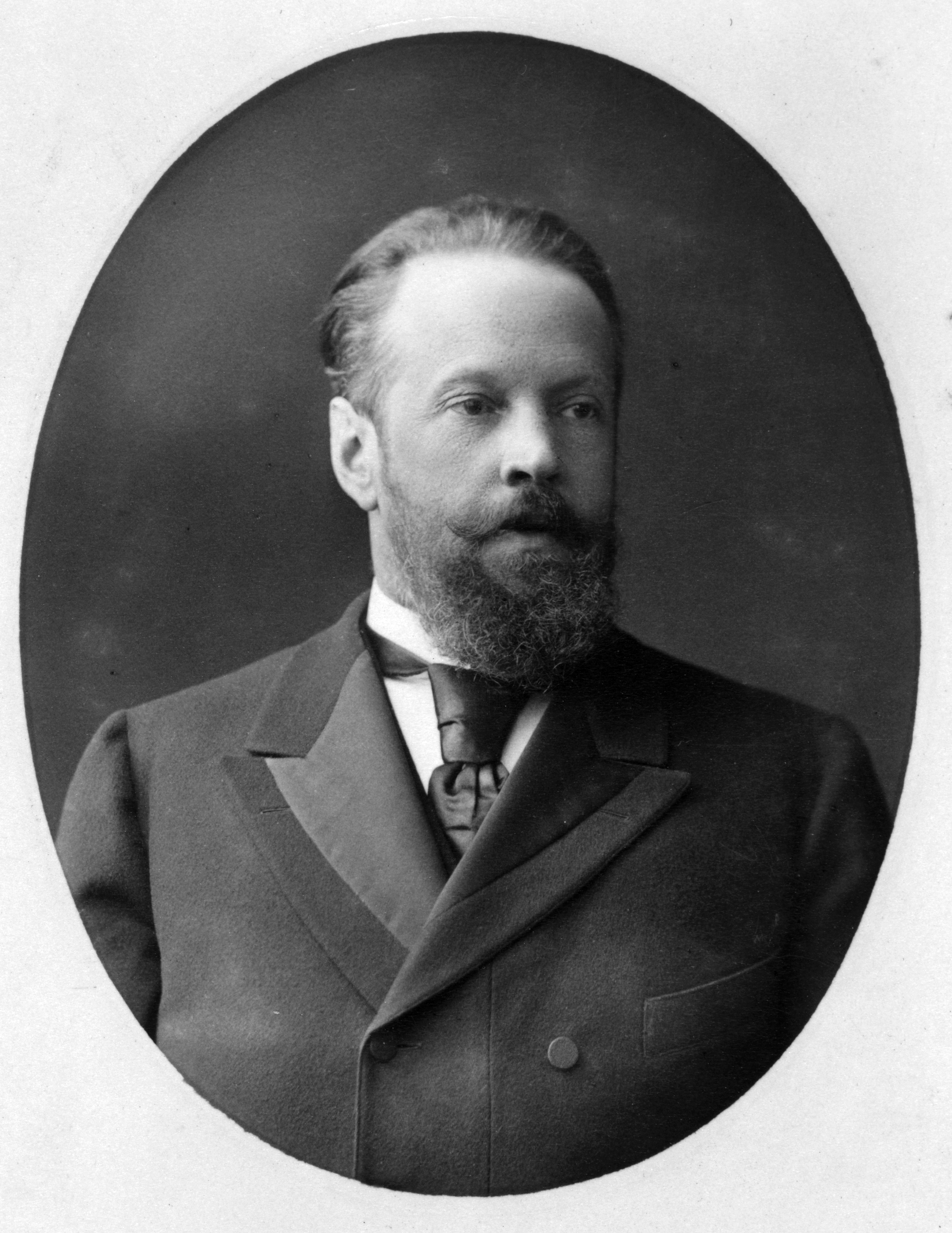
- Witte in the early 1880s

1st Prime Minister of the Russian Empire
- In office 19 October 1905 – 22 April 1906
- Monarch: Nicholas II
- Preceded by: Himself as Chairman of the Committee of Ministers
- Succeeded by: Ivan Goremykin

Chairman of the Committee of Ministers of the Russian Empire
- In office 16 August 1903 – 21 April 1906
- Monarch: Nicholas II
- Preceded by: Ivan Durnovo
- Succeeded by: Himself as Prime Minister

Minister of Finance
- In office 30 August 1892 – 16 August 1903
- Monarchs: Alexander III; Nicholas II
- Preceded by: Ivan Vyshnegradsky
- Succeeded by: Eduard Pleske

14th Minister of Railways
- In office 15 February 1892 – 30 August 1892
- Monarch: Alexander III
- Preceded by: Adolf Gibbenet
- Succeeded by: Apollon Krivoshein

Personal details
- Born: Sergei Yulyevich Witte; 29 June 1849 Tiflis, Caucasus Viceroyalty, Russian Empire (now Tbilisi, Georgia)
- Died: 13 March 1915 (aged 65) Petrograd, Russian Empire
- Cause of death: Brain tumor
- Resting place: Alexander Nevsky Monastery, Saint Petersburg, Russia
- Education: Novorossiysk University
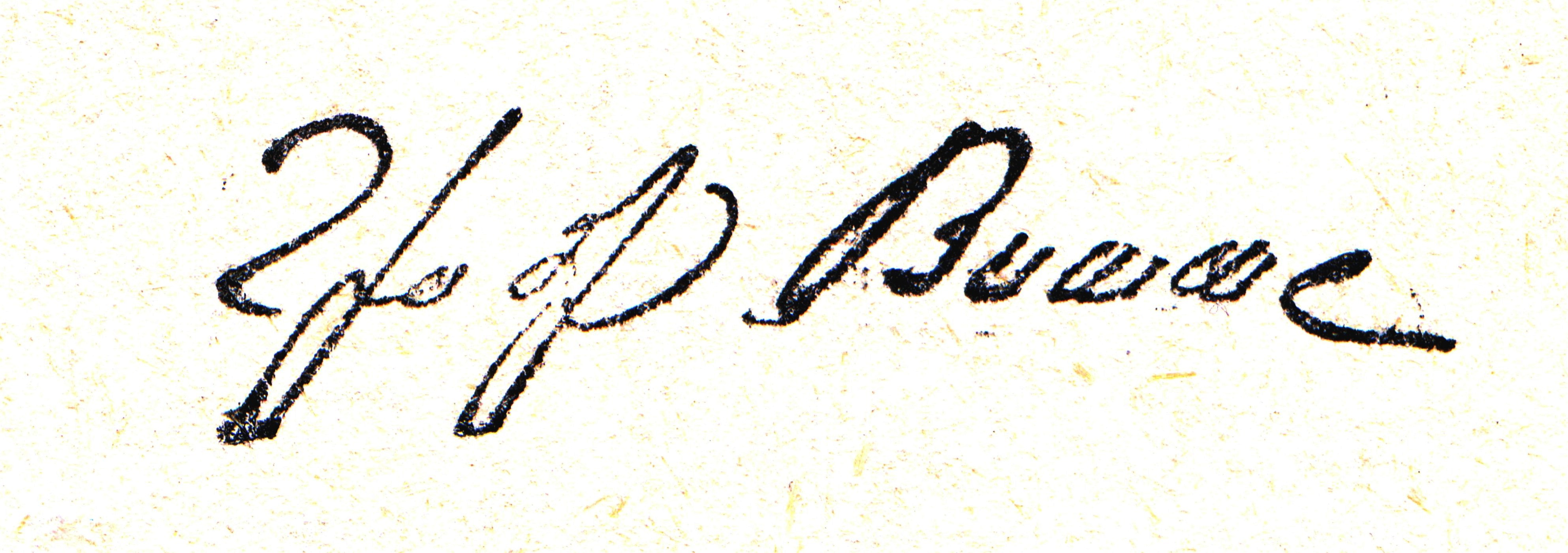
- Signature

Count Sergei Yulyevich Witte (Russian: Сергей Юльевич Витте, romanized: Sergey Yulyevich Vitte, IPA: [sʲɪrˈɡʲej ˈjʉlʲjɪvʲɪtɕ ˈvʲitːɛ]; 29 June [O.S. 17 June] 1849 – 13 March [O.S. 28 February] 1915), also known as Sergius Witte, was a Russian statesman who served as the first prime minister of the Russian Empire, replacing the emperor as head of government. Neither liberal nor conservative, he attracted foreign capital to boost Russia's industrialization. Witte's strategy was to avoid the danger of wars.

Count Witte served under the final two emperors of Russia, Alexander III (r. 1881–1894) and Nicholas II (r. 1894–1917). During the Russo-Turkish War of 1877–1878, he had risen to a position in which he controlled all the traffic passing to the front along the lines of the Odessa Railways. As finance minister from 1892–1903, Witte presided over extensive industrialisation and achieved government monopoly control over an expanded system of railway lines.

Following months of civil unrest and outbreaks of violence in what became known as the 1905 Russian Revolution, Witte framed the October Manifesto and the accompanying government communication to establish constitutional government. However, he was not convinced it would solve Russia's problems with the Tsarist autocracy. On 20 October 1905 Witte was appointed as the first chairman of the Council of Ministers (effectively prime minister). Assisted by his Council, he designed Russia's first constitution. But within a few months Witte fell into disgrace as a reformer because of continuing court opposition to these changes. He resigned before the First Duma assembled on 10 May [O.S. 27 April] 1906. Witte was fully confident that he had resolved the main problem: providing political stability to the regime, but according to him, the "peasant problem" would further determine the character of the Duma's activity.

He is widely considered to have been one of the key figures in Russian politics at the end of the 19th century and the beginning of the 20th century. Orlando Figes has described Witte as the 'great reforming finance minister of the 1890s', 'one of Nicholas's most enlightened ministers', and as the architect of Russia's new parliamentary order in 1905.

== Family and early life ==
Witte's father, Julius Christoph Heinrich Georg Witte, was from a Lutheran Baltic German family. He converted to Russian Orthodoxy upon his marriage with Yekaterina Fadeyeva. His father was made a member of the knighthood in Pskov but moved as a civil servant to Saratov and Tiflis (present-day Tbilisi, Georgia). Sergei was raised on the estate of his mother's parents. His grandfather was Andrei Mikhailovich Fadeyev, a Governor of Saratov and Privy Councillor of the Caucasus, and his grandmother was Princess Helene Dolgoruki. Sergei had two brothers (Alexander and Boris) and two sisters (Olga and Sophia). Helena Blavatsky, noted as a mystic, was their first cousin. Witte studied at a Tiflis gymnasium, but he took more interest in music, fencing and riding than in academics. He finished Gymnasium I in Kishinev and began studying Physico-Mathematical Sciences at the Novorossiysk University in Odessa in 1866 and graduated at the top of his class in 1870. After completing his studies he devoted some time to journalism in close relations with the Slavophiles and Mikhail Katkov.

Witte had initially planned to pursue a career in academia with the intention of becoming a professor in theoretical mathematics. His relatives took a dim view of that career path, as it was considered unsuitable for a noble or aristocrat at the time. He was instead persuaded by Prince Vladimir Pavlovich Machabelov, Minister of Ways and Communication, to pursue a career in the Russian railroads. At the direction of the count, Witte undertook six months of training in a variety of positions on the Odessa Railways to gain a practical understanding of Russian railways operations. At the end of that period, he was appointed as chief of the traffic office.

After a wreck on the Odessa Railways in late 1875 cost many lives, Witte was arrested and sentenced to four months in prison. However, while he was still contesting the case in court, Witte directed the Odessa Railways and achieved extraordinary efforts towards the transport of troops and war materials in the Russo-Turkish War and attracted the attention of Grand Duke Nicholas Nikolaevich, who commuted his prison sentence to two weeks. Witte had devised a novel system of double-shift operations in his efforts to overcome delays on the railways.

In 1879, Witte accepted a post in St. Petersburg, where he would meet his future wife. He moved to Kiev the following year. In 1883, he published a paper on "Principles of Railway Tariffs for Cargo Transportation" in which he also discussed social issues and the role of the monarchy. Witte gained popularity in the government. In 1886, he was appointed manager of the privately held Southwestern Railways, based in Kiev, and was noted for increasing its efficiency and profitability. Around then, he met Tsar Alexander III, but he conflicted with the tsar's aides by warning of the danger in their practice of using two powerful freight locomotives to achieve high speeds for the royal train. His warnings were proven in the October 1888 Borki train disaster, Witte was then appointed Director of State Railways.

== Political career ==
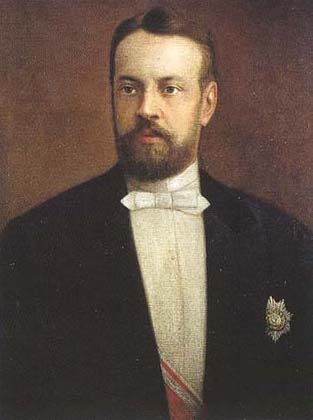
Witte in the 1880s

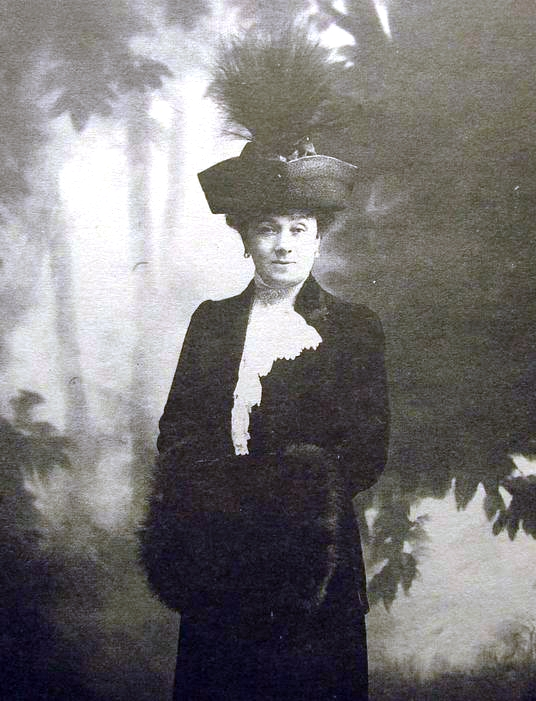
Matilda Witte, picture by Karl Bulla

=== Railways ===
Witte worked in railroad management for 20 years after he had begun as a ticket clerk. He caught the attention of Finance Minister Ivan Vyshnegradsky, who appointed him as Russian Director of Railway Affairs within the Finance Ministry, where he served from 1889 to 1891. During that period, he oversaw an ambitious program of railway construction. Until then, less than one fourth of the small railway systems were under direct state control, but Witte set about expanding the rail lines and getting the railway service under control as a state monopoly. Witte also obtained the right to assign employees based on their performance or merit, rather than for patronage for political or familial connections. In 1889, he published a paper, "National Savings and Friedrich List", which cited the economic theories of Friedrich List and justified the need for a strong domestic industry, to be protected from foreign competition by customs barriers.

A new customs law for Russia was passed in 1891, spurring an increase in industrialization by the turn of the 20th century. While Witte worked to achieve industrialization, he also fought for practical education. He said that railways operated by the state would be useless "unless it does its utmost for spreading technical education..."

Tsar Alexander III appointed Witte in 1892 as acting Minister of Ways and Communications. That gave him both control of the railroads in Russia and the authority to impose a reform on the tariffs charged. "Russian railroads gradually became perhaps the most economically operated railroads of the world". Profits were high: over 100 million gold rubles a year to the government (exact amount unknown because of accounting defects).

In 1892 Witte became acquainted with Matilda Ivanovna (Isaakovna) Lisanevich in a theater. Witte began to seek her favour, urging her to divorce her gambling husband and marry him. The marriage was a scandal not only because Matilda was a divorcée but also because she was a converted Jew. That cost Witte many of his connections with the upper nobility, but the tsar protected him.

=== Minister of Finance ===
In August 1892, Witte was appointed to the post of Minister of Finance, which he held for the next eleven years, and he nearly doubled the revenues of the empire. (Until 1905 matters pertaining to industry and commerce were within the province of the Ministry of Finance.) During his tenure, he greatly accelerated the construction of the Trans-Siberian Railway. He also emphasized creation of an educational system to train personnel for industry, in particular, the establishment of new "commercial" schools. He was known for appointing subordinates by their academic credentials or merit, rather than because of patronage or political connections. In 1894, he concluded a 10-year commercial treaty with the German Empire on favorable terms for Russia. When Alexander III died, he told his son on his deathbed to listen well to Witte, his most capable minister.

In 1895, on a crusade against the evils of drunkenness, Witte established a state monopoly on alcohol, which became a major source of revenue for the Russian government. In 1896, he concluded the Li–Lobanov Treaty with Li Hongzhang of the Qing dynasty. One of the rights secured for Russia was the construction of the Chinese Eastern Railway across northeast China, which greatly shortened the route of the Trans-Siberian Railway to its projected eastern terminus at Vladivostok. However, following the Triple Intervention, Witte strongly opposed the Russian occupation of Liaodong Peninsula and the construction of the naval base at Port Arthur in the Russia–Qing Convention of 1898.

==== Gold standard ====
In 1896, Witte undertook a major currency reform to place the Russian ruble on the gold standard. That resulted in increased investment activity and an increase in the inflow of foreign capital. Witte also enacted a law in 1897 limiting working hours in enterprises, and in 1898 reformed commercial and industrial taxes. In 1899 the Petrograd Polytechnical Institute was founded on his initiative.

In summer 1898, he addressed a memorandum to the Tsar calling for an agricultural conference on the reform of the peasant community. This resulted in three years of talks about laws to abolish collective responsibility and facilitate the resettlement of farmers onto lands on the outskirts of the empire. Many of his ideas were later adopted by Pyotr Stolypin. In 1902 Witte's supporter, Dmitry Sipyagin, the Minister of Home Affairs, was assassinated. In an attempt to keep up the modernization of the Russian economy, Witte called and oversaw the Special Conference on the Needs of the Rural Industry. The conference was to provide recommendations for future reforms and compile the data to justify those reforms. By 1900 the growth in the manufacturing industry had been four times faster than in the preceding five-year period and six times faster than in the decade before that. External trade in industrial goods was equal to that of Belgium. In 1904, the Union of Liberation was formed, which demanded economic and political reform.

==== Worsening relations with Japan in 1890s ====
Witte controlled East Asian policy in the 1890s. His goal was peaceful expansion of trade with Japan and China. Japan, with its greatly expanded and modernized military, easily defeated the antiquated Chinese forces in the First Sino-Japanese War (1894–95). Russia had to confront collaborating with Japan with which relations had been fairly good for some years or acting as protector of China against Japan. Witte chose the second policy, and in 1894, Russia, Germany and France forced Japan to soften the peace terms that it had imposed on China. Japan was forced to cede the Liaodong Peninsula and Port Arthur back to China (both territories were located in south-western Manchuria, a Chinese province).

The new Russian role angered Tokyo, which decided Russia was the main enemy in its quest to control Manchuria, Korea and China. Witte underestimated Japan's growing economic and military power and exaggerated Russia's military prowess. Russia concluded an alliance with China (in 1896 by the Li–Lobanov Treaty), which led in 1898 to the Russian occupation and administration (by its own personnel and police) of the entire Liaodong Peninsula. Russia also fortified the ice-free Port Arthur and completed the Russian-owned Chinese Eastern Railway, which was to cross northern Manchuria from west to east and link Siberia with Vladivostok. In 1899, the Boxer Rebellion broke out, and the Chinese attacked all foreigners. A large coalition of the major Western powers and Japan sent armed forces to relieve their diplomatic missions in Peking. The Russian government used that as an opportunity to bring a substantial army into Manchuria. As a consequence, by 1900, Manchuria was a fully incorporated outpost of the Russian Empire, and Japan prepared to fight Russia.

=== Loss of power ===
Witte, in a memorandum, tried to turn the reports of the zemstvo presidents into a condemnation of the Home Office. In a political conflict on land reform, Vyacheslav von Plehve accused him of being part of a Jewish-Masonic conspiracy. According to Vasily Gurko, Witte had dominated the irresolute tsar, and his opponents decided that was the moment to get rid of him.

Witte was appointed on 16 August 1903 (O.S.) as chairman of the Committee of Ministers, a position he held until October 1905. While officially a promotion, the post had no real power. Witte's removal from the influential post of Minister of Finance was engineered under the pressure of the landed gentry and his political enemies within the government and at the court. But historians Nicholas V. Riasanovsky and Robert K. Massie say that Witte's opposition to Russian designs on Korea resulted in his resignation from the government in 1903.

=== Diplomatic career ===
Negotiating the Treaty of Portsmouth (1905) – from left to right: the Russians at far side of table are Korostovetz, Nabokov, Witte, Rosen, Plancon; and the Japanese at near side of table are Adachi, Ochiai, Komura, Takahira, Satō. The large conference table is today preserved at the Museum Meiji Mura in Inuyama, Aichi Prefecture, Japan.

Witte was brought back into the governmental decision-making process to help deal with growing civil unrest. Confronted with increasing opposition and, after consulting with Witte and Prince Sviatopolk-Mirsky, the tsar issued a reform ukase on December 25, 1904 with vague promises. After the Bloody Sunday riots of 1905, Witte supplied 500 rubles, the equivalent of 250 dollars, to Father Gapon in order for the leader of the demonstration to leave the country. Witte recommended that the government issue a manifesto related to the people's demands. Schemes of reform would be elaborated by Ivan Goremykin and a committee consisting of elected representatives of the zemstva and municipal councils under the presidency of Witte. On 3 March the tsar condemned the revolutionaries. The government issued a strongly worded prohibition of any further agitation in favor of a constitution. By spring a new political system was beginning to form in Russia. A petition campaign was conducted seeking a wide variety of proposed changes, such as ending the war with Japan, which lasted from February to July 1905. In June mutiny broke out on the Russian battleship Potemkin.

The tsar called upon Witte to negotiate an end to the Russo-Japanese War. He was sent to the United States for the talks, as the Russian emperor's plenipotentiary titled "his Secretary of State and President of the Committee of Ministers of the Emperor of Russia," along with Baron Roman Rosen, Master of the Imperial Court of Russia. The peace talks were held in Portsmouth, New Hampshire.

Witte is credited with negotiating brilliantly on Russia's behalf during the Treaty of Portsmouth discussions. Russia lost little in the final settlement. But the loss of the war with Japan is believed to have marked the beginning of the end of Imperial Russia. For his efforts, he was made a Count (Russian: граф, romanized: graf).

After that diplomatic success, Witte wrote to the tsar stressing the urgent need for political reforms at home. He was dissatisfied with proposals by Alexander Bulygin, the successor of Sviatopolk-Mirsky. Even figures like Mikhail Osipovich Menshikov and Vladimir Meshchersky agreed. A 6 August (O.S.) manifesto created a Duma as a consultative body only. Elections of its representatives would not be direct but be held in four stages, and qualifications for class and property would exclude much of the intelligentsia and all of the working classes from suffrage. The proposal was greeted by numerous protests and strikes across the country, which became known as the Russian Revolution of 1905.

=== 1905 Revolution and Chairman of the Council of Ministers ===
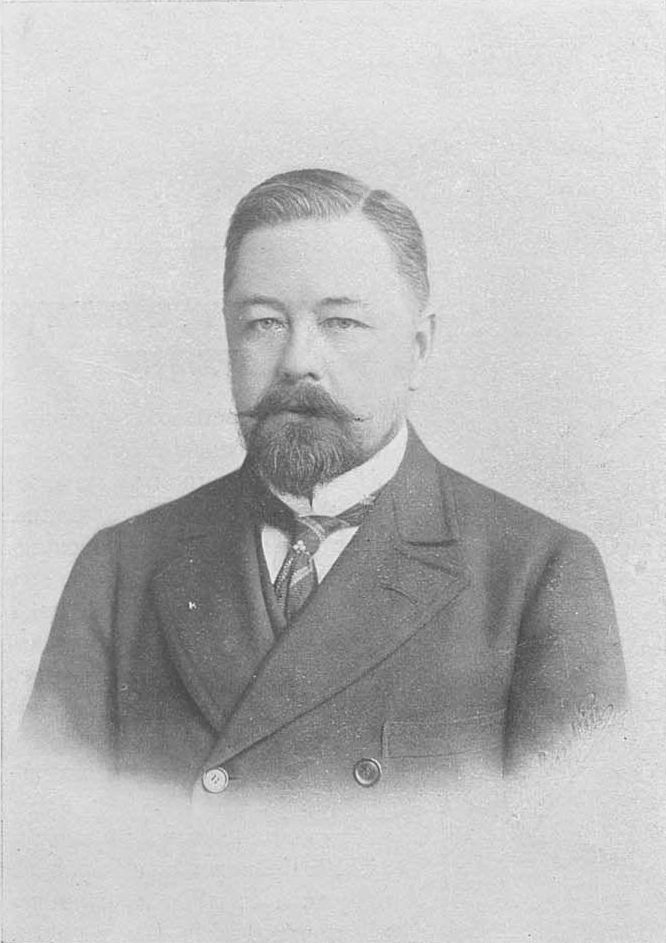
Prince Alexey D. Obolensky

Witte described the regime's usual "incompetence and obstinacy" in response to the crisis of 1904–1905 as a "mixture of cowardice, blindness and stupidity".

On 8 January 1905, Witte and Sviatopolk-Mirsky had been approached by a delegation of intellectuals led by Maxim Gorky, who begged them to negotiate with demonstrators. After the government's postings of warnings of 'resolute measures' against street gatherings led by Father Gapon, they worried about violent confrontation, which did take place. They were unsuccessful as the government had believed they could control Fr. Gapon. Leaving his visiting cards with Witte and Mirsky, Gorky was arrested, along with the other members of the deputations.

In late 1905, Witte was approached by the tsar's advisers, in an effort to save the country from complete collapse, and on 9 October 1905, he went to the Winter Palace for a meeting. Here he told the tsar 'with brutal frankness' that the country was on the verge of a catastrophic revolution, which he said 'would sweep away a thousand years of history'. He presented the tsar with two choices: either appoint a military dictator, or agree to broad and major reforms. In a memorandum arguing for a manifesto, Witte outlined the reforms needed to appease the masses.

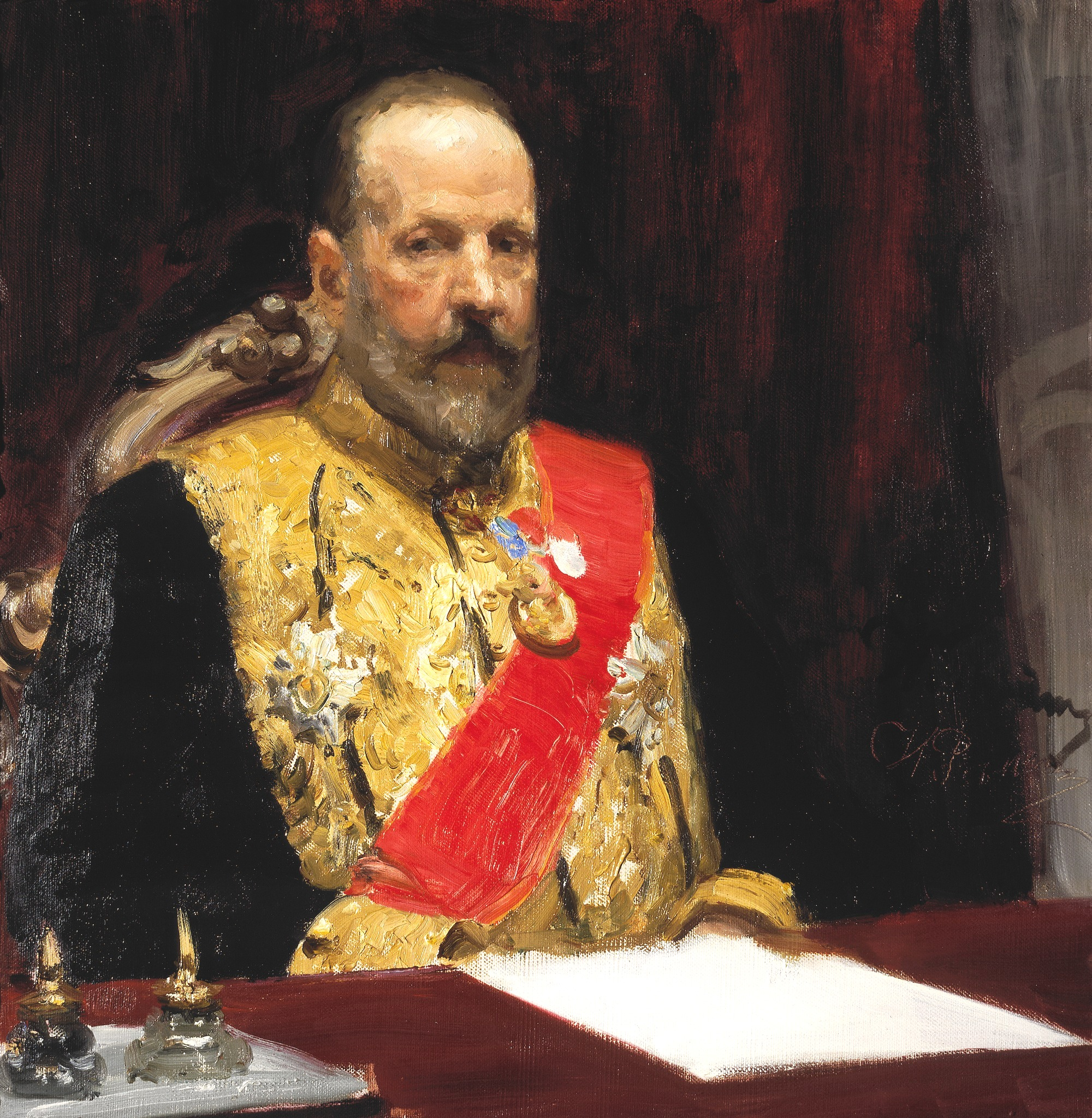
Witte by Ilya Repin in 1903

He argued for the following reforms: creation of a legislative parliament (Imperial Duma) elected via a democratic franchise; granting of civil liberties; establishing a cabinet government and a 'constitutional order'. Those demands, which basically comprised the political programme of the Liberation Movement, were an attempt to isolate the political Left by pacifying the liberals. Witte emphasised that repression would be only a temporary solution to the problem and a risky one because he believed that the armed forces, whose loyalty was now in question, could collapse if they were to be used against the masses. Most of the military advisers to the tsar agreed with Witte, as did the Governor of Saint Petersburg, Dmitri Feodorovich Trepov, who wielded considerable influence at court. Only when Nicholas II's cousin Grand Duke Nicholas threatened to shoot himself if he did not agree to Witte's demands, following the tsar's request for him to accept appointment as dictator, would the tsar agree. He was embarrassed to have been forced by a former "railway clerk", a man who was a bureaucrat and "businessman," to relinquish his autocratic rule. (Note: Not even his abdication in 1917 was considered as big a humiliation than agreeing to the demands.) Witte later said that the tsar's court were ready to use the Manifesto as a temporary concession, and later return to autocracy "when the revolutionary tide subsided".

In October Witte was charged with the task of assembling the nation's first cabinet government, and he offered the liberals several portfolios: Ministry of Agriculture to Ivan Shipov; Ministry of Trade and Industry to Alexander Guchkov; Ministry of Justice to Anatoly Koni and the Ministry of Education to Evgenii Troubetzkoy. Pavel Milyukov and Prince Georgy Lvov were also offered ministerial posts. None of those liberals agreed to join the government, though. Witte had to form his cabinet from 'tsarist bureaucrats and appointees lacking public confidence'. The Kadets doubted that Witte could deliver on the promises made by the tsar in October, knowing the tsar's staunch opposition to reform.

Witte argued that the Tsarist regime could be saved from a revolution only by the transformation of Russia into a 'modern industrial society', in which 'personal and public initiatives' were encouraged by a rechtsstaat that guaranteed civil liberties.

In the two weeks following the October Manifesto, several pogroms took place against Jews, especially in St. Petersburg and Odessa. Witte ordered an official investigation, where it was revealed that the police in the former city had organised, armed and given vodka to, the anti-Semitic crowds, and even participated in the attacks. Witte demanded the prosecution of the chief of police in St. Petersburg, who was involved in the printing of anti-Semitic pamphlets, but the tsar intervened and protected him. Witte believed that anti-Semitism was 'considered fashionable' among the elite. In the aftermath of the Kishinev pogrom in 1903, Witte had said that if Jews 'comprise about fifty percent of the membership in the revolutionary parties', it was 'the fault of our government. The Jews are too oppressed'.

Milyukov once confronted Witte to ask why he would not commit himself to a constitution. Witte replied that he could not 'because the Tsar does not wish it'. Witte was worried that the court was only using him, as had emerged in talks with members of the Kadet Party.

After his skillful diplomacy Witte was appointed as Chairman of the new Council of Ministers, the equivalent of Prime Minister, and formed Sergei Witte's Cabinet, not belonging to any party, as there were none. No longer was the tsar the head of the government. "Immediately upon my nomination as President of the Imperial Council I made it clear that the Procurator of the Most Holy Synod Konstantin Pobedonostsev, could not remain in office, for he definitely represented the past." He was replaced by Prince Alexey D. Obolensky. Trepov and Alexander Bulygin were dismissed and, after many discussions, Pyotr Nikolayevich Durnovo was appointed as Minister of Interior on 1 January 1906; his appointment is considered one of the greatest errors Witte made during his administration.

According to Harold Williams: "That government was almost paralyzed from the beginning. Witte acted immediately by urging the release of political prisoners and the lifting of censorship laws." Alexander Guchkov and Dmitry Shipov refused to work with the reactionary Durnovo and to support the government. On 26 October (O.S.), the tsar appointed Trepov as Master of the Palace without consulting Witte, and had daily contact with the emperor; his influence at court was paramount. "In addition mass violence broke out in the days following the issuance of the October Manifesto. The major source of the unrest was unrelated to the October Manifesto. It took the form of attacks by gangs in the cities on the Jews. In general, the authorities ignored the attacks.

On 8 November, the sailors in Kronstadt mutinied. The same month, the border provinces were clearly taking advantage of the weakening of Central Russia to show their teeth. Witte later wrote in his Memoirs about the empire's ethnic minorities:

The dominating element of the Empire, the Russians, fall into three distinct ethnic branches: the Great, the Little, and the White Russians, and 35 per cent, of the population is non-Russian. It is impossible to rule such a country and ignore the national aspirations of its varied non-Russian national groups, which largely make up the population of the Great Empire. The policy of converting all Russian subjects into "true Russians" is not the ideal which will weld all the heterogeneous elements of the Empire into one body politic. It might be better for us Russians, I concede, if Russia were a nationally uniform country and not a heterogeneous Empire. To achieve that goal there is but one way, namely to give up our border provinces, for these will never put up with the policy of ruthless Russification. But that measure our ruler will, of course, never consider.

On 10 November, 'Congress Poland' was placed under martial law on the basis of local opposition to the Duma and demands for autonomy (viewed by many as a potential starting point for independence).

Witte's position was not well established. The Liberals remained obdurate and refused to be cajoled. The All-Russian Peasant Union asked the Russian people to refuse to make redemption payments to the government and withdraw their deposits from banks that might be subject to government action. He promised an eight-hour working day and tried to secure vital loans from France to keep the government from bankruptcy.

Witte sent his envoy to the Rothschild bank; they responded that

"they would willingly render full assistance to the loan, but that they would not be in a position to do so until the Russian Government had enacted legal measures tending to improve the conditions of the Jews in Russia. As I deemed it beneath our dignity to connect the solution of our Jewish question with the loan, I decided to give up my intention of securing the participation of the Rothschilds."

On 24 November by Imperial decree provisional regulations on the censorship of magazines and newspaper was released.

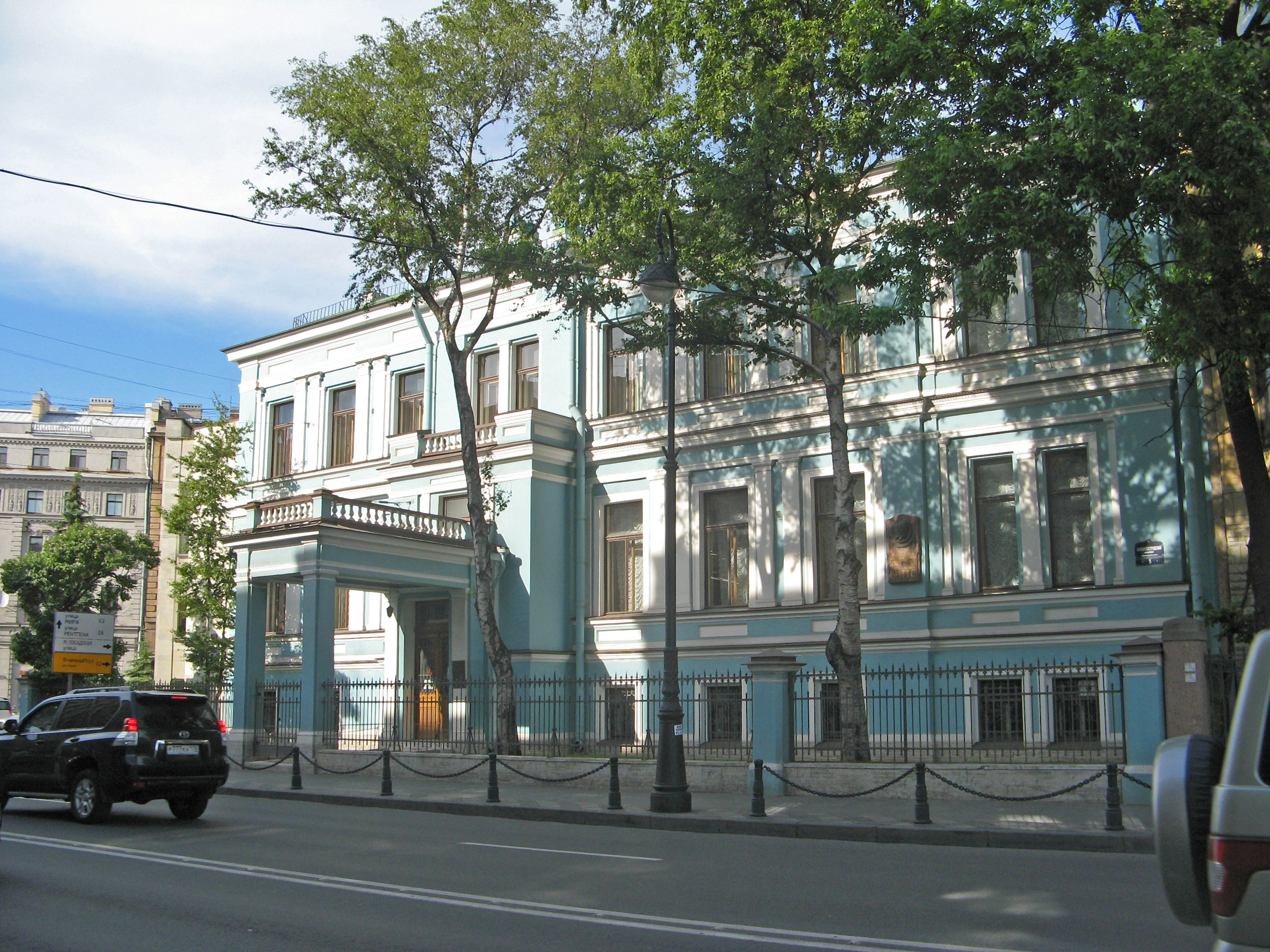
Witte's mansion on Kamennoostrovsky Prospekt in St Petersburg between 1903-1915

On 16 December Trotsky and the rest of the executive committee of the St. Petersburg Soviet were arrested. The Minister of Agriculture Nikolai Kutler resigned in February 1906; Witte refused to appoint Alexander Krivoshein. In the next few weeks, changes and additions to the Russian Constitution of 1906 were made, so that the emperor was confirmed as the dictator of foreign policies and the supreme commander of the army and navy. The ministers remained responsible solely to Nicholas II, not to the Duma. The "peasant question" or land reforms was a hot issue; the influence of the "Duma of Public Anger" had to be limited, according to Goremykin and Dmitri Trepov. The Bolsheviks boycotted the coming election. When Witte discovered that Nicholas never intended to honour those concessions, he resigned as Chairman of the Council of Ministers. The position and influence of General Trepov, Grand Duke Nicholas, the Black Hundreds, and overwhelming victories by the Kadets in the 1906 Russian legislative election, forced Witte on 14th to resign, which was announced 22 April 1906 (O.S.).

Witte confessed to Alexander Polovtsov in April 1906 that the success of the repressions in the wake of the Moscow uprising in 1905 had resulted in his losing all influence over the tsar. Despite Witte's protests, Durnovo was allowed to 'carry out a brutal and excessive, and often totally unjustified, series of repressive measures.'

In 1906, Father Gapon returned to Russia from exile and supported Witte's government. On 30 April 1905 Witte proposed the Law of Religious Toleration, followed by the edict of 30 October 1906 giving legal status to schismatics and sectarians of the Russian Orthodox Church (ROC), the established state church. Witte argued that ending discrimination against religious rivals of the Orthodox Church 'would not harm the church, provided it embraced the reforms that would revive its religious life'. Although the Church's 'senior hierarchs' may for some time have played with the thought of self-government, Witte's demand that it would come at the cost of religious toleration 'guaranteed to drive them back into the arms of reaction'. Witte had made that demand (self-government in exchange for religious toleration) in the hope of 'wooing' the important commercial groups of the ethnic minorities of Jewish and Old Believer communities.

=== Member of the State Council ===
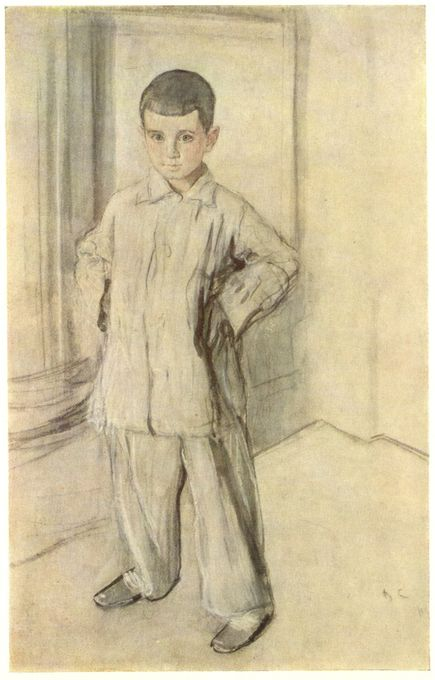
Witte's grandson Lev Kyrillovich Naryshkin in a portrait by Valentin Serov

According to Dmitry Filosofov, Witte was the only talented person in the government, but he brought many troubles to Russia. He destroyed the autocracy not from the outside like revolutionaries but from the inside. Witte failed to retain the confidence of the emperor but continued in Russian politics as a member of the State Council but he was never again appointed to an administrative role in the government. He was ostracized by the Russian establishment. In January 1907 a bomb was found planted in his home. The investigator Pavel Alexandrovich Alexandrov proved that the Okhrana, the tsarist secret police, had been involved. During the winter season, Witte lived in Biarritz and started writing his Memoirs, but he returned to St Petersburg in 1908.

During the July Crisis in 1914, Grigori Rasputin, and Witte desperately urged the Tsar to avoid the conflict and warned that Europe faced calamity if Russia became involved. The advice went unheeded.

=== Death ===
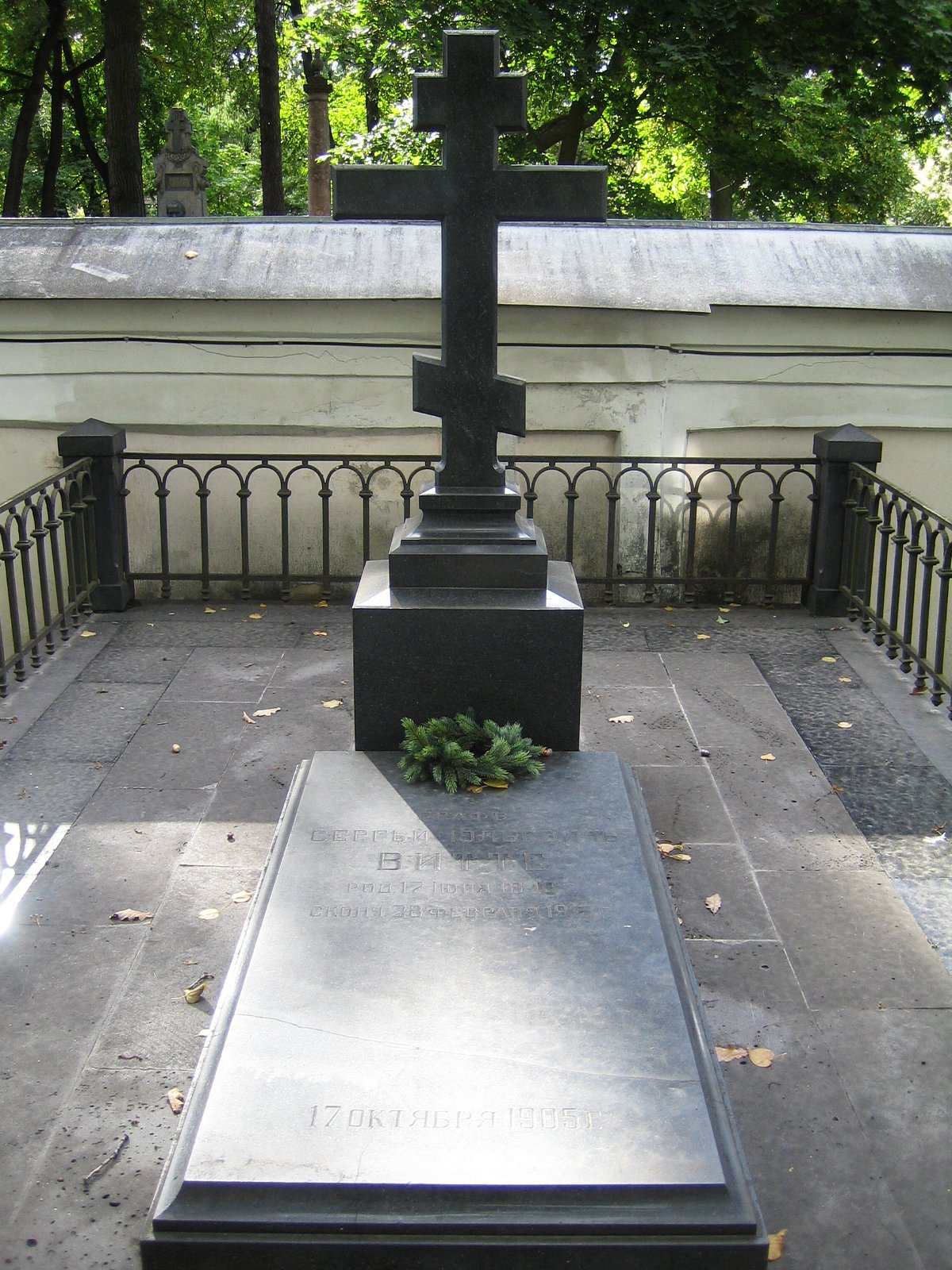
Witte's grave in Lazarev Cemetery, St. Petersburg

Witte died in February 1915 at his home in St. Petersburg; his quick death was attributed to meningitis or a brain tumor. His third-class funeral was held at the Alexander Nevsky Lavra. On the black granite slab, in addition to the usual dates of birth and death, another date was carved: 17 October 1905, the date he presented the Manifesto. Witte had no children, but he had adopted his wife's by her first marriage. According to Edvard Radzinsky, Witte asked in vain for the title of Count to be given to his grandson, L. K. Naryshkin (1905–1963).

Witte's reputation was burnished in the West after his secret memoirs were published in translation in 1921. They had been completed in 1912 and kept in a bank in Bayonne, France. He had left orders that they could not be published during the lifetimes of him and his contemporaries. The ambassador in France, Vasily Maklakov, received them from his widow. The original manuscript of his memoirs are now held in Columbia University Library's Bakhmeteff Archive of Russian and East European History and Culture.

== Honours ==
The Sergei Witte University of Moscow, with campuses in Ryazan, Krasnodar, and Nizhny Novgorod is named in his honour (a private institution accredited by the Ministry of Science and Higher Education (Russia) in 1997).

Russian orders and decorations

- Knight of St. Stanislaus, 1st Class, 1890
- Knight of St. Anna, 1st Class, 1894
- Commemorative Medal of the Reign of Emperor Alexander III, 1896
- Emperor Nicholas II Coronation Medal, 1896
- Medal "For Works on the First General Population Census", 1897
- Knight of the White Eagle, 1904
- Knight of St. Alexander Nevsky, in Diamonds, 1906
- Red Cross Medal "In Commemoration of the Russo-Japanese War", 1906
- Commemorative Medal of the Romanov Tricentenary, 1913
- Knight of St. Vladimir, 1st Class, 1913

Foreign orders and decorations

- Siam: Grand Cross of the White Elephant, 1889
- Emirate of Bukhara:
  - Order of the Star of Bukhara, 1st Class in Diamonds, 1893
  - Order of the Sun of Alexander, 1902
- France: Grand Cross of the Legion of Honour, January 1894
- German Empire:
  - Grand Cross of the Red Eagle, 1894; with Collar, 1905
  - Knight of the Prussian Crown, 1st Class, 1896
  - Knight of the Black Eagle, July 1897
- Austria-Hungary: Grand Cross of the Imperial Order of Leopold, 1894; in Diamonds, 1897
- Kingdom of Serbia:
  - Grand Cross of the Cross of Takovo, 1894
  - Grand Cross of the White Eagle, 1901
- Belgium: Grand Cordon of the Order of Leopold, 1894
- Denmark: Grand Cross of the Dannebrog, 6 April 1895
- Qing dynasty: Order of the Double Dragon, Class I Grade III, 1896
- Ethiopian Empire: Grand Cross of the Star of Ethiopia, 1896
- Kingdom of Greece: Officer of the Redeemer, 1896; Grand Cross, 1898
- Sweden-Norway: Commander Grand Cross of the Order of Vasa, 1897
- Principality of Bulgaria: Grand Cross of St. Alexander, 1898
- Kingdom of Romania: Grand Cross of the Star of Romania, 1898
- Persian Empire:
  - Order of the Lion and the Sun, 1st Class in Diamonds, 1900
  - Order of the August Portrait, in Diamonds, 1900
- Kingdom of Portugal: Grand Cross of the Military Order of Christ, 1900
- Ottoman Empire: Order of Osmanieh, 1st Class in Diamonds, 1901

== Popular culture depictions ==
- Witte was portrayed in the 1908 film The Big Man (lost) based on the satirical play with the same name. The play enjoyed a considerable success.
- 1908 play: «Вожди» by Alexander Yuzhin
- He was portrayed by Laurence Olivier in the film Nicholas and Alexandra (1971).
- He was portrayed by Freddie Jones in the British BBC series Fall of Eagles (1974).

== See also ==
- Bibliography of the Russian Revolution and Civil War
- Outline of the Russian Revolution and Civil War
- Index of articles related to the Russian Revolution and Civil War
- History of the Russian Far East
- History of Sino-Russian relations

== Bibliography ==
- Ananich, B. V. and S. A. Lebedev, "Sergei Witte and the Russo-Japanese War." International Journal of Korean History 7.1 (2005): 109-131. Online
- Boublikoff, A. A. "A suggestion for railroad reform". In: Buehler, E.C. (editor) "Government ownership of railroads", Annual Debater's Help Book (vol. VI), New York, Noble and Noble, 1939; pp. 309–318. Original in journal North American Review, vol. 237, pp. 346+. (This issue is 90% about Russian railways.)
- Davis, Richard Harding, and Alfred Thayer Mahan. (1905). The Russo-Japanese war; a photographic and descriptive review of the great conflict in the Far East, gathered from the reports, records, cable despatches, photographs, etc., etc., of Collier's war correspondents New York: P. F. Collier & Son. OCLC: 21581015
- Figes, Orlando (2014). A People's Tragedy: The Russian Revolution 1891–1924. London: The Bodley Head. ISBN 9781847922915.
- Harcave, Sidney. (2004). Count Sergei Witte and the Twilight of Imperial Russia: A Biography. Armonk, New York: M.E. Sharpe. ISBN 978-0-7656-1422-3
- Kochan, Lionel. "Sergei Witte: The Last Statesman of Imperial Russia" History Today (Feb 1968), Vol. 18 Issue 2, pp 102–108, online.
- Kokovtsov, Vladimir (1935). Out of My Past (translator, Laura Matveev). Stanford: Stanford University Press.
- Korostovetz, J. J. (1920). Pre-War Diplomacy The Russo-Japanese Problem. London: British Periodicals Limited.
- Theodore H. von Laue (1963) Sergei Witte and the Industrialization of Russia
- Witte, Sergei. (1921). The Memoirs of Count Witte (translator, Abraham Yarmolinsky). New York: Doubleday. online free
- Wcislo, Francis W. (2011). Tales of Imperial Russia: The Life and Times of Sergei Witte, 1849-1915. New York: Oxford University Press. ISBN 978-0-19-954356-4.

Political offices
Preceded by Adolf Gibbenet	Transport Minister; February 1892 – August 1892	Succeeded by Apollon Krivoshein
Preceded by Ivan Vyshnegradsky	Finance Minister; 1892–1903	Succeeded by Eduard Pleske
Preceded by Ivan Durnovo	Chairman of the Committee of Ministers; 1903–1905	Succeeded by Himself as Prime Minister
Preceded by Himself as Chairman of the Committee of Ministers	Prime Minister of Russia; 2 November 1905 – 5 May 1906	Succeeded by Ivan Goremykin
