= Pyotr Bark =

Russian banker

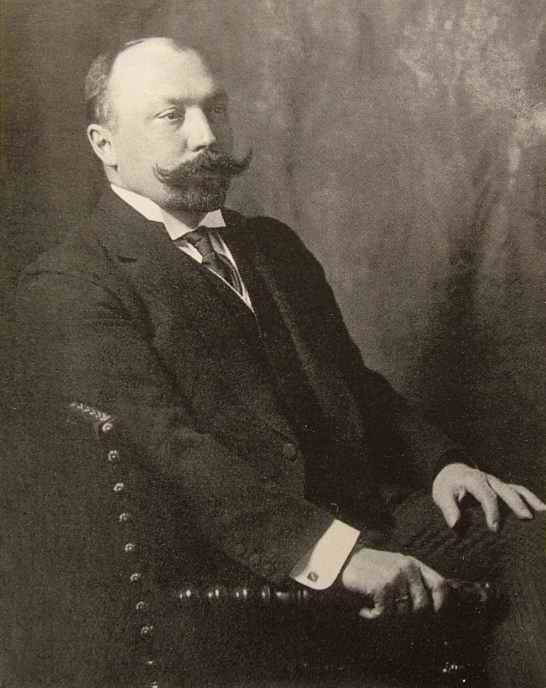
Pyotr Bark.

Pyotr Lvovich Bark (Russian: Пётр Львович (Людвигович) Барк; Ukrainian: Петро Львович (Людвігович) Барк; 18 April 1869 – 16 January 1937), later Sir Peter Bark was a Russian government official and later a banker.

== Biography ==
Bark was born in Novotroitskoye village in Yekaterinoslav Governorate. He descended from a Baltic-German family in Estonia. (Note: He was nephew of Ernst (Ernesto) Bark.) His father Karl Ludwig Bark (later Ludwig Genrikhovich after converting to the Russian Orthodox faith) was a forestry manager for the Royal forests.

After studying law at St. Petersburg university, Pyotr Bark entered the Credit Chancellery of the Ministry of Finance in 1891. Later he acted as a private secretary to the governor of the State Bank of Russia. In 1903 he went to Berlin to study banking with Mendelssohn & Co. On his return he was appointed manager of the foreign department of the State Bank. Later he became deputy Governor of the State Bank.

He resigned from his post in 1907 to accept an appointment in the private Volga-Kama Commercial Bank.

In 1911 Bark was appointed Assistant Minister of Commerce and Industry; In 1914 he was appointed Minister of Finance, replacing Vladimir Kokovtsov. He served in that position throughout the First World War until the abdication of Nicholas II.

Briefly detained by the Provisional Government, he was soon released, after which he immigrated to the west. He held the position of Managing-Director of the Anglo-International Bank based in London. He was knighted by King George V of the United Kingdom in 1935 for his contributions to the banking industry.

Bark married Baroness Sofia Leopoldovna von Behr (1867–1957) and had two children: a daughter, Nina (1900–1975) and a son, Georgiy (1904–1936).

Bark died in Aubagne, France, and is buried in the Russian cemetery in Nice.
