= Alexander Abaza =

Russian minister of finance from 1880 to 1881

- Александр Абаза
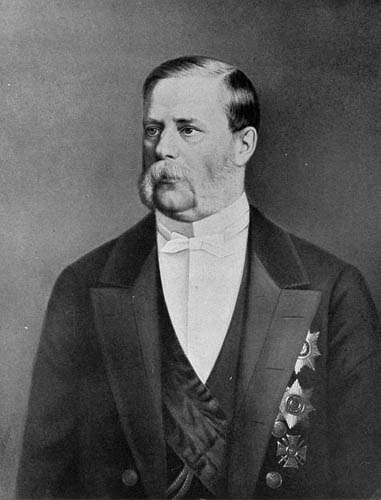

Minister of Finance of Russia
- In office 1880–1881
- Preceded by: Samuil Greig
- Succeeded by: Nikolai von Bunge

Personal details
- Born: 1821 Vyshnevolotsky Uyezd, Tver Governorate, Russia
- Died: 1895 (aged 73–74) Nice, France
- Education: Saint Petersburg Imperial University

Alexander Ageevich Abaza (Russian: Алекса́ндр Аге́евич Абаза́; 1821–1895) was a Russian politician. He was one of the most liberal advisors of Alexander II of Russia. He served as the minister of finance from October 27, 1880, to May 6, 1881, and unsuccessfully urged the tsar to transform Imperial Russia into a constitutional monarchy. After Alexander II's assassination and the accession of Alexander III, reformers like Abaza were removed from power. In his career he also served as State Comptroller (1871–1874) and as chairman of State Council's Department of the State Economy (1874–1880 and 1884–1892). He was a recipient of the Order of the White Eagle, the Order of Saint Vladimir, the Order of Saint Anna and the Order of Saint Stanislaus.

== Biography ==
Alexander Abaza was born on July 24, 1821, in the Borovinsky distillery in Vyshnevolotsk County, Tver province, in the family of a major landowner and sugar refiner Aggei Vasilievich Abaza and his wife Praskovia, daughter of State Councilor Loggin Mikhailovich Manzey, a Scotsman by birth. Baptized July 31, 1821. Godson of Ivan Alexeevich Melnitsky.

In 1839 he graduated from the Faculty of Law of the Imperial Saint Petersburg University. Since December 13, 1839, he was in military service: in the cavalry pioneer squadron and Leib-Guards at hussar regiment. Abaza took part in hostilities in the Caucasus and was awarded the Order of St. Vladimir, 4th class, with swords,[7] in 1843. On July 17, 1847 retired with the rank of major.

Since 1847 he lived on his mansion, engaged in agriculture and studying financial law. In 1857, he entered the civil service with the rank of collegiate assessor. He joined the enlightened circle grouped around the Grand Duchess Elena Pavlovna and became one of the preachers of the "great reforms".

In 1865–1868, he was a member of the Council of the minister of finance and the first council of the Main society of Russian railways. He took active part in the construction of the Kharkov-Kremenchug railway. Also Abaza was awarded the orders of St. Stanislav, 1st class (1865) and St. Anna, 1st class (1868), as well as the order of Adolph Nassau commander's cross, 1st class, with a star.

Since 1871 was a member of State union of Russian empire. In 1871—1874 was governmental controller and in 1874—1880 was chairman in economy department of State union; 25 May 1879 was established as member of criminal trial, established over revolutionary A.K. Solovyev, who was attempting to kill emperor Alexander II.

In 1872 was given order of St. Vladimir 2-nd degree; in 1876 - order of White eagle; in 1878 - order Saint Alexandr Nevskiy (in 1883 - brilliant signs for order); in 1880 - order of St. Vladimir 1-st degree.

In October 1880 - May 1881, minister of finance of Russia: initiated the abolition of the salt excise tax, insisted on the state construction of railroads and their redemption from private owners; carried out an increase in customs duties. Together with M. T. Loris-Melikov and N. K. Bunge he developed the program of social and economic transformations in the sphere of taxation, currency circulation, railway building and financial management. He actively supported the draft constitution of Loris-Melikov.

He resigned after the manifesto "On the firmness of the autocracy" given by the new emperor Alexander III; dismissed on May 6, 1881.

In 1884-1892 he was again сhairman of the department of economy of the State Council. In 1890-1892 he was chairman of the finance Committee. In 1876 he was elected an honorary member of the St. Petersburg Academy of Sciences. In 1881 he became an honorary member of the Moscow society of nature testers. In 1889 he was awarded the order of St. Andrew.

He was bestowed court ranks "as a ceremonial master" (1857), chamberlain (1859), "status of hofmeister" (1861), the rank of a civil councilor (1863), hofmeister and privy councilor (1867), and full privy councilor (1874).

Abaza was considered as passionate gamer and in English club played on the biggest amounts of money. In 1892 S.U. Vitte got information that Abaza made operation on the stock market for reducing cost of ruble's exchange rate. According to data of S.U. Vitte Abaza used for this operation confidential information and got 1 mln.rubles of profit. So after publicity of incident Abaza was forced to resign. 10 of Mart 1893 was fired from all posts and sent to vacation on indefinite period, but was stayed as member of State Council.

Abaza was living in mansion on str. quay of Fontanka, 23. Died in Nice on 24 of January (5 February) 1895. Buried on Tihvinsky cemetery of Aleksadr-Nevskiy's church in St. Petersberg (tombstone is lost).

== Family ==
He was married twice. His first wife was the daughter of millionaire Dmitriy Benardaki, so she brought to Abaza big trousseau and made him wealthy. She died of phthisis in Berlin, buried in Petersberg. Their daughter Praskovya (04.04.1852, Naples — 1928), maid of honor was married to prince Lev Pavlovich Urusov (married from 12 January 1876, Paris).

His second wife (from 01.02.1862) - Julia Fedorovna Staube (1830–1915), about her prince S.M Volkonsky recalled: "There was a figure that does not repeat ... The drawing room of Julia Fedorovna Abaza for many years was the music center in St. Petersburg ... She was very straightforward in their reviews, strict in her musical and artistic assessment. The artists valued her opinion." F. I. Tyutchev dedicated his poem to her. In the 1870s and 1880s Abaza was living almost openly in the house of his mistress Elena Nelidova (1837–1904). L. Lurie writes that he put Nelidova in a house on Fontanka, and his wife had to move into the house on Sergievskaya.

Brothers: Erast Ageevich Abaza (1819–1855), major, amator musician, the author of romance to the poems of I.S Turgenev "Foggy morning", was mortally wounded during the Crimean war. Mihail Ageevich Abaza (1825–1859). Nephew, admiral Aleksey Mihailovich Abaza (1853–1917), was killed during the duel.

== Sources ==
- "Абаза, дворянский род" . Brockhaus and Efron Encyclopedic Dictionary (in Russian). 1906.
- Polunov, Alexander (2005) Russia in the Nineteenth Century: Autocracy, Reform, and Social Change. Armonk, NY: M.E. Sharpe. ISBN 0-7656-2162-2
