= Ivan Shipov =

Politician in the Russian Empire (1865–1919)

Ivan Pavlovich Shipov
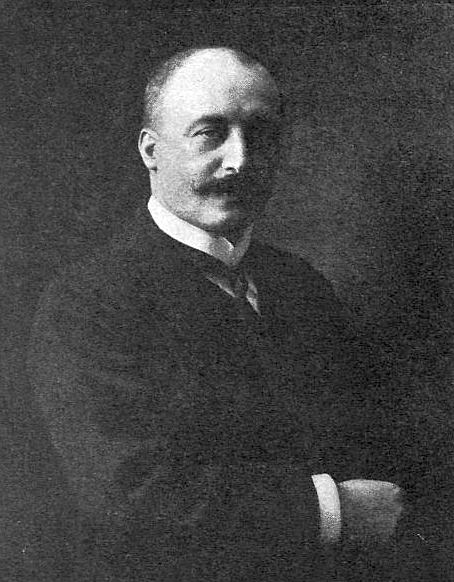
- Ivan Shipov

Governor of the State Bank of the Russian Empire
- In office 22 April 1914 – November 1917
- Preceded by: Alexei Konshin
- Succeeded by: Position abolished

Minister of Trade and Industry
- In office 1908 – 14 January 1909
- Preceded by: Dmitry Filosofov
- Succeeded by: Vasily Timiriazev

Minister of Finance
- In office 28 October 1905 – 24 April 1906
- Preceded by: Vladimir Kokovtsov
- Succeeded by: Vladimir Kokovtsov

Personal details
- Born: 23 June 1865 Nizhny Novgorod, Russian Empire
- Died: 1919 (aged 53–54) Yekaterinodar or Rostov-on-Don
- Education: Imperial Alexander Lyceum; Saint Petersburg University

Ivan Pavlovich Shipov (23 June 1865 – 1919) was a Russian statesman and financier who served in several senior positions in the Russian Empire, including Minister of Finance (1905–1906), Minister of Trade and Industry (1908–1909), and Governor of the State Bank of the Russian Empire (1914–1917). Following the October Revolution, Shipov became notable for his organised resistance to Bolshevik attempts to seize control of the State Bank, refusing to recognise the legitimacy of the Soviet of People's Commissars. After his dismissal, he joined the White movement in southern Russia and participated in the VSYUR administration before his death, likely from typhus, in late 1919.

== Early life and education ==
Shipov was born on 23 June 1865 in Nizhny Novgorod into an old Russian noble family with origins dating to the second half of the sixteenth century. He enrolled at the Imperial Alexander Lyceum while simultaneously attending lectures as an auditor at the Faculty of Law of Saint Petersburg University, studying political economy and finance. Upon completing his coursework, he passed examinations before the Council of the Alexander Lyceum in 1884.

== Career in the Ministry of Finance ==
=== Early positions (1885–1905) ===
In 1885, Shipov entered state service in the chancellery of the Department of Assessed Taxes within the Ministry of Finance. He served there in progressively senior positions until 1891. His subsequent appointments included tax inspector of Kalyazin district in Tver Governorate, followed by positions in the chancellery of the Committee of Ministers, where he served as assistant head and then head of a section from 1891 to 1894.

Returning to the Ministry of Finance in 1894, Shipov was appointed Vice-Director of the Special Credit Office (1894–1897), followed by Director of the General Chancellery of the Minister of Finance (1897–1902). During this period, he worked closely with Sergei Witte, who served as Minister of Finance. In 1902, Shipov became Director of the Department of the State Treasury, a position he held until 1905. He also served on the Board of the State Bank from 1902 to 1905.

Shipov participated in numerous governmental commissions during this period, including those on monetary reform, gold mining regulations, and the introduction of the Russian monetary system in the Grand Duchy of Finland. He authored a study on German colonisation policies in Prussian Poland (1894) for the chancellery of the Committee of Ministers, and contributed an article on Russian monetary systems to the Ministry of Finance's official collection prepared for the Paris Exposition of 1900.

=== Portsmouth Peace Conference (1905) ===
In June 1905, Shipov was dispatched to Washington, D.C., United States, to participate in the peace negotiations ending the Russo-Japanese War. He served as a delegate-specialist on financial matters, assisting the Russian chief plenipotentiary Sergei Witte at what became the Treaty of Portsmouth.

=== Minister of Finance (1905–1906) ===
Following the conclusion of the Treaty of Portsmouth, Emperor Nicholas II appointed Shipov Minister of Finance on 28 October 1905 as part of Witte's cabinet, succeeding Vladimir Kokovtsov. Shipov held this position for only six months. His long association with Witte contributed to his removal from the ministry when the entire Witte cabinet was dismissed on 24 April 1906, shortly before the convening of the First State Duma.

=== Minister of Trade and Industry (1908–1909) ===
Following his departure from the Finance Ministry, Shipov remained a member of the Finance Committee and the Council of the State Bank. In 1908, he was appointed Minister of Trade and Industry and rejoined the Council of Ministers.

Shipov served as Minister of Trade and Industry for approximately one year before being replaced in January 1909 and appointed to the State Council.

=== Governor of the State Bank (1914–1917) ===
On 22 April 1914, Shipov was appointed Governor of the State Bank. He retained this position, along with his membership in the Finance Committee and State Council, throughout World War I until the Russian Revolution of 1917.

During his tenure, the State Bank played a critical role in financing Russia's war effort. By the fall of 1917, war-related credits represented more than 90% of the bank's balance sheet. In May 1917, Shipov warned the Provisional Government's Ministry of Finance of the deteriorating monetary situation, writing: "A catastrophe appears to be approaching. One must wonder how we have managed to this point."

== Opposition to the Bolsheviks ==
=== Confrontation with Soviet authorities (November 1917) ===
Following the October Revolution on 7 November [O.S. 25 October] 1917, the Bolsheviks moved to seize control of Russia's financial institutions. On the first day of the revolution, an armed detachment under direct orders from Vladimir Lenin occupied the State Bank building in Petrograd. However, the bank's staff, led by Shipov, refused to cooperate with the new regime.

According to a first-hand account published in the documentary collection The Bolshevik Revolution, 1917–1918:

The Soviet of People's Commissars insisted upon a complete subordination of the bank and a transfer of ten million rubles which were required for urgent operations. The personnel of the bank, together with its manager, Shipov, refused to recognise the Soviet Government: they insisted upon "autonomy" in their work and refused to transfer the money.

Beginning on 12 November 1917, the Council of People's Commissars (Sovnarkom) issued decrees threatening bank directors, particularly Shipov, with arrest if they continued to refuse cooperation. Despite these threats, Shipov and the Petrograd banking community maintained their resistance.

On 17 November 1917, Shipov responded to Bolshevik criticism by noting that the State Bank had paid out, in the preceding week, more than 600 million rubles to the army, representatives of Russia's legitimate government, and to public charities such as soup kitchens. To the Bolsheviks, whom he regarded as usurpers lacking proper authorisation for government withdrawals, he would give nothing.

=== Dismissal and bank employees' strike ===
On 20 November 1917, Lenin dispatched the new Commissar of Finance, Vyacheslav Menzhinsky, along with a battalion of armed sailors to the State Bank "with a band at their head" and vehicles "to carry off the spoil." This attempt failed when bank employees and guards, fearing looting, objected to the armed presence.

Menzhinsky returned on 24 November 1917 with a larger force and an ultimatum: unless Shipov relented and transferred the requested funds, every State Bank employee would be dismissed, forfeit their pensions, and those of military age would be conscripted. When Shipov continued to refuse, the Bolsheviks dismissed him.

Shipov's dismissal triggered a mass walkout by State Bank employees. According to US historian Sean McMeekin, "all but a small handful of State Bank employees walked out in protest, leaving no one in place to advise Menzhinsky's men." The Bolshevik financial team found themselves unprepared to operate the complex institution; as one of them, Valerian Obolensky, later admitted: "There were people among us who were acquainted with the banking system from books and manuals... but there was not a single man among us who knew the technical procedure of the Russian State Bank."

The bank employees' strike was part of a broader wave of civil service resistance to Bolshevik rule. By December 1917, nearly every state employee in Russia was engaged in what the Bolsheviks termed "sabotage"—refusing to recognise Lenin's seizure of power. The formation of the Cheka on 20 December 1917 was partly in response to this organised resistance.

On 14 December 1917, the Council of People's Commissars issued a decree nationalising all banks. The State Bank was merged with the nationalised private banks into the People's Bank of the Russian Republic, subsequently renamed the People's Bank of the RSFSR.

== White movement and death ==
Following his dismissal, Shipov fled Bolshevik-controlled territory and made his way to southern Russia, where White (anti-Bolshevik) forces under General Anton Denikin were organising. In 1919, he arrived in Yekaterinodar (present-day Krasnodar), which served as the capital of the White-controlled territories in the south.

Shipov joined the Special Council, the governing body functioning as a civilian government under the Armed Forces of South Russia (VSYUR) command. The Special Council, established on 31 August 1918, included departments for finance, trade and industry, and other governmental functions modeled on pre-revolutionary ministries.

Shipov subsequently participated in organising the Central Administration of the State Bank of the VSYUR in Rostov-on-Don. The White forces attempted to maintain a parallel banking and monetary system on territory they controlled, though they faced severe difficulties with inflation and currency stabilisation.

The exact date and place of Shipov's death remain uncertain. According to available sources, he died in late 1919, most likely from typhus. A devastating typhus epidemic swept through southern Russia during the Russian Civil War, affecting both military personnel and refugees in White-controlled cities including Yekaterinodar, Rostov-on-Don, and Novorossiysk. Some sources give his death year as 1920.

== Legacy ==
Shipov's signature appears on Russian imperial banknotes issued during his tenure as Governor of the State Bank (1914–1917). His resistance to the Bolshevik takeover of the State Bank became a notable episode in accounts of the early Soviet period and the challenges faced by the new regime in establishing control over Russia's financial system.

== Honours and rank ==
- Privy Councillor, achieved 1904
- Member of the State Council (from 1909)
- Member of the Finance Committee (from 1906)

== See also ==
- State Bank of the Russian Empire
- October Revolution
- Russian Civil War
- Armed Forces of South Russia
- Sergei Witte
- Vladimir Kokovtsov
- Red Terror

Political offices
Preceded by Vladimir Kokovtsov	Minister of Finance of the Russian Empire; 1905–1906	Succeeded by Vladimir Kokovtsov
Preceded by Dmitry Filosofov	Minister of Trade and Industry; 1908–1909	Succeeded by Vasily Timiriazev
Preceded by Alexei Konshin	Governor of the State Bank of the Russian Empire; 1914–1917	Succeeded by Position abolished
