= Nicholas Hartwig =

Russian diplomat (1857–1914)

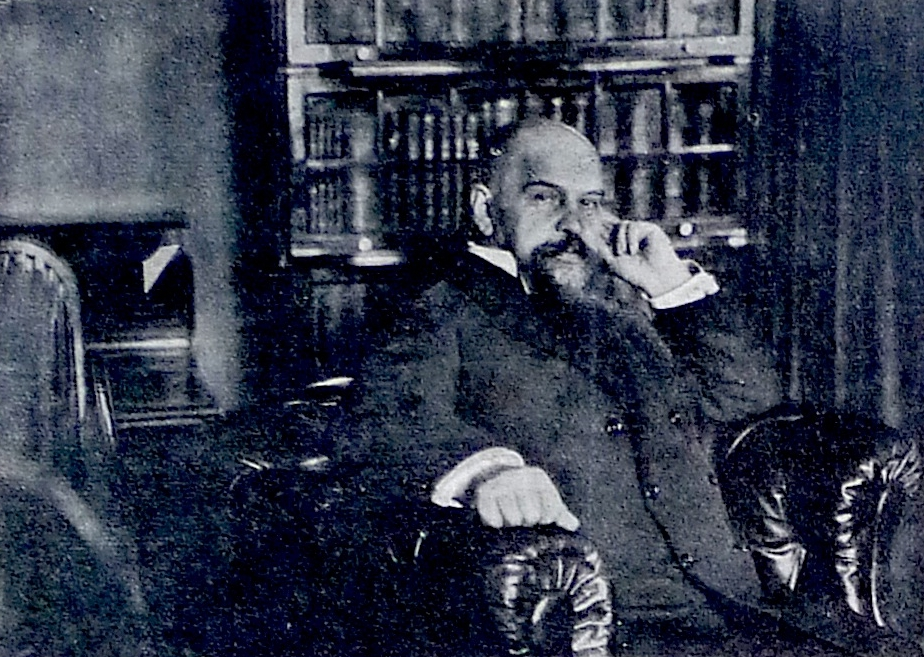
Hartwig in 1912

Baron Nicholas Genrikhovich Hartwig (Russian: Николай Генрихович Гартвиг, romanized: Nikolay Genrikhovich Gartvig; German: Nikolaus von Hartwig; December 16, 1857 – July 10, 1914) was a Russian diplomat and government official who served as the ambassador to Persia (1906–1908) and Serbia (1909–1914). An ardent pan-Slavist, he was said to be "more Serbian than the Serbs" and during the period prior to World War I was believed by many to exercise tremendous influence over the foreign policy of the Serbian government.

During the July Crisis of 1914, he advocated a joint belligerent line by Russia and Serbia against any demands by Austria-Hungary.

== Biography ==
=== Early life and career ===
Hartwig was born into a noble family of ethnic German descent in Gori (present-day Georgia). He attended the Saint Petersburg Imperial University where his intelligence and ambition brought him to the notice of the Ministry of Foreign Affairs, and he began his diplomatic career in 1875, when he was attached to the Asiatic Department.

Hartwig also wrote for the highly nationalist and Slavophile newspaper Novoye Vremya during this time period. His articles criticized the then-direction of Russia's foreign policy, and particularly in regard to the Near East, which Hartwig thought was too soft. His views earned him the admiration of the Russian general staff, which thought similarly, and also won him high-placed friends at the court of Alexander II, which were to prove influential later in his career.

=== Importance in the Ministry of Foreign Affairs ===
When Count Lamsdorff succeeded Mikhail Muraviev as Foreign Minister in June 1900, he promoted Hartwig to the position of Director of the Asiatic Department. Hartwig had previously served as the vice-director of the Asiatic Department and had established a close friendship with Lamsdorff. He was viewed by many as the Count's protege, and when Lamsdorff left the ministry in 1906, Hartwig was one of several candidates thought to have a good chance to succeed him. However, he lost the post to Alexander Izvolski, a hated rival.

=== Service in Persia ===
Following his defeat by Izvolski, Hartwig then attempted to gain an influential embassy instead, preferably in Constantinople. Izvolski did not want Hartwig in any position of importance however, and instead assigned him to be Russia's ambassador to Persia. Hartwig never forgave Izvolski for this slight, and viewed his appointment to Tehran as a diplomatic exile.

Hartwig responded by sabotaging the promising negotiations then going on between Great Britain and Russia with regards to Persia. He was also instrumental in suppressing an attempted revolution to overthrow Mohammad Ali Shah Qajar, ordering the Russian-officered Cossack Brigade to surround the British legation and prevent anyone from gaining sanctuary there. Later he ordered the 1908 bombardment of the Majlis.

Many observers felt that Hartwig had overstepped his bounds, but his powerful friends enabled Hartwig to essentially pursue his own policy. He was not on speaking terms with the British ambassador, especially after the counterrevolution in Persia succeeded.

Hartwig was recalled in 1908, coinciding with the recall of the British ambassador; both countries wished to renew their discussions over the partition of Persia and their respective ministers were perceived as a liability.

=== Service in Serbia ===
In 1909 Izvolski was forced to resign following the humiliation of Russia after Austria-Hungary annexed Bosnia-Herzegovina. Izvolski had engaged in private discussions prior to the annexation with Count Aehrenthal, the Austrian foreign minister, and was therefore implicated. It was thought that Izvolski's nebulous promises of Russian support gave Austria the courage to proceed with the annexation. Izvolski therefore served as a perfect scapegoat for the failure of Russian diplomacy, and he was forcibly ousted. The court of Nicholas II pressed for a more pro-Slavic foreign policy. Hartwig was once again considered for the post of foreign minister, but was thwarted by the intervention of Pyotr Stolypin, the chairman of the Tsar's council of ministers. Stolypin wanted someone more controllable than the ambitious Hartwig, and it therefore represented a great success for him to have his son-in-law Sergei Sazonov appointed to the post.

Reflecting the more militant pro-Serbian element at court, Hartwig was assigned to the vacant Russian ministry in Belgrade. He quickly followed the same pattern as he had in Persia, pursuing a course at many times independent of the direction of Sazonov. Hartwig felt that in addition to representing 'official' Russia, he also represented 'unofficial' Russia—the Pan-Slavists and more militantly pro-Serbian court party. The result of this was that he often gave the Serbian government the impression that they would get more support from Russia than the official line dictated. Unless given direct instructions by Sazonov to the contrary, Hartwig would frequently embellish or exaggerate the extent of Russian sympathy for Serbia in his communications to the Serbian government. Hartwig was also on excellent terms with the prime minister of Serbia, Nikola Pašić.

Hartwig was a key figure in the formation of the system of alliances formed in 1912 between Serbia and Bulgaria, Greece, and Montenegro (the Balkan League). He was a violent opponent of Austria and, along with Sazonov, thought of the alliance system as being primarily oriented against Austria. As a Pan-Slavist, however, he was not opposed to territorial gains at the expense of Turkey after the conclusion of the Balkan Wars, and was one of the first to reject the territorial status quo line then pursued both by Sazonov and Count Berchtold, the new Austrian foreign minister.

Hartwig backed the Serbian government's demands for a revision of the military agreement with Bulgaria, which were to include additional pieces of Macedonian territory. This was to compensate Serbia for the loss of territory, and particularly an outlet on the Aegean Sea, to the newly created state of Albania. Hartwig encouraged the resolution of the settlement through a direct meeting of the prime ministers of each of the four Balkan countries (Serbia, Bulgaria, Greece, and Montenegro). Suspicions about Bulgarian territorial aspirations in Macedonia had already driven Greece and Serbia closer together, and Montenegro had followed the Serbian line from the start. Hartwig was aware that any conference between the four prime ministers would thus favor the Serbian territorial demands. By advocating this line with Sazonov, who was more ignorant of the complexities of Balkan politics, Hartwig appeared to be pressing for peace in the Balkans while in actuality directly contributing to the start of the Second Balkan War and its resultant increases in Serbian territory and prestige.

=== Death ===
After the assassination of Franz Ferdinand, Hartwig encouraged a militant Serbian line against Austria. It is unclear what, if any, role Hartwig might have played in connection with the Black Hand.

While visiting the Baron von Giesl, Austrian minister to Belgrade, Hartwig collapsed of a massive heart attack on July 10, 1914. The Serbian press immediately published several inflammatory articles accusing the Austrians of poisoning Hartwig while he was a guest at their legation.

Hartwig was buried in Belgrade at the request of the Serbian government. Many notable Serbian officials, including Pašić, attended his funeral.

== Literature ==
- Helmreich, Ernst. The Diplomacy of the Balkan Wars, 1912-1913. London: Oxford University Press, 1938.
- Janner Jr., William. The Lions of July: Prelude to War, 1914. Novato: Presidio Press, 1996.
- Kazemzadeh, Firuz. Russia and Britain in Persia, 1864-1914: A Study in Imperialism. New Haven: Yale University Press, 1968.
- Rossos, Andrew. Russia and the Balkans: Inter-Balkan Rivalries and Russian Foreign Policy, 1908-1914. Buffalo: University of Toronto Press, 1981.

Preceded by Alexei Nikolaevich Speyer	Russian Ambassador to Persia; 1906 – 1908	Succeeded by Stanislaw Alfonsovich Poklewski-Koziell
