= List of Tsarskoye Selo Lyceum people =

This is a list of alumni and faculty associated with Tsarskoye Selo Lyceum, located in Tsarskoye Selo near Saint Petersburg, Russia. During thirty-three years of the Tsarskoe Selo Lyceum's existence (1811–1918), there were 286 graduates.

== Alumni by year of entrance ==
=== 1811 ===
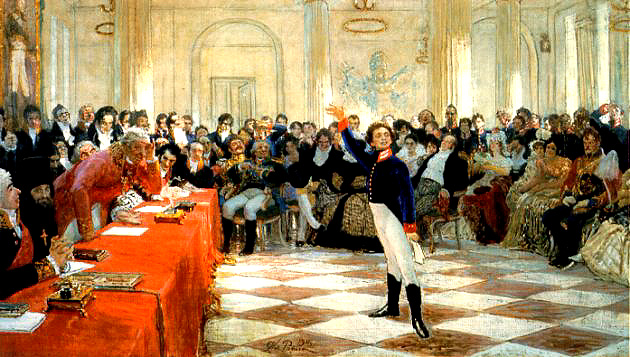
Pushkin reciting his poem before old Derzhavin

- Prince Alexander Gorchakov (1798–1883), diplomat
- Konstantin Danzas (1801–1870), major general
- Baron Anton Delvig (1798–1831), poet and journalist
- Wilhelm Kuchelbecker (1797–1846), poet and Decembrist
- Sergey Lomonosov (1799–1857), diplomat
- Fyodor Matyushkin (1799–1872), admiral and senator
- Alexander Pushkin (1799–1837), poet
- Ivan Pushchin (1798–1859), Decembrist
- Pavel Yudin (1798–1852)

=== Other years ===
- Nicholas de Giers
- Dmitry Tolstoy
- Jacob Grot
- Nikolay Danilevsky
- Aleksey Lobanov-Rostovsky
- Fyodor Shcherbatskoy
- Mikhail Saltykov-Shchedrin
- Mikhail Petrashevsky
- Peter Saburov
- Alexander Bulatovich
- Alexandr Aksakov
- Alexey Yermolov
- Sergey Sazonov
- Vladimir Lambsdorff
- Alexander Izvolsky

== Notable faculty ==
- Pafnuty Chebyshev

== See also ==
- Education in Russia
- Lists of schools
