= List of ambassadors of Russia to Serbia =

Ambassador of the Russian Federation to the Republic of Serbia
- Emblem of the Russian Foreign Ministry

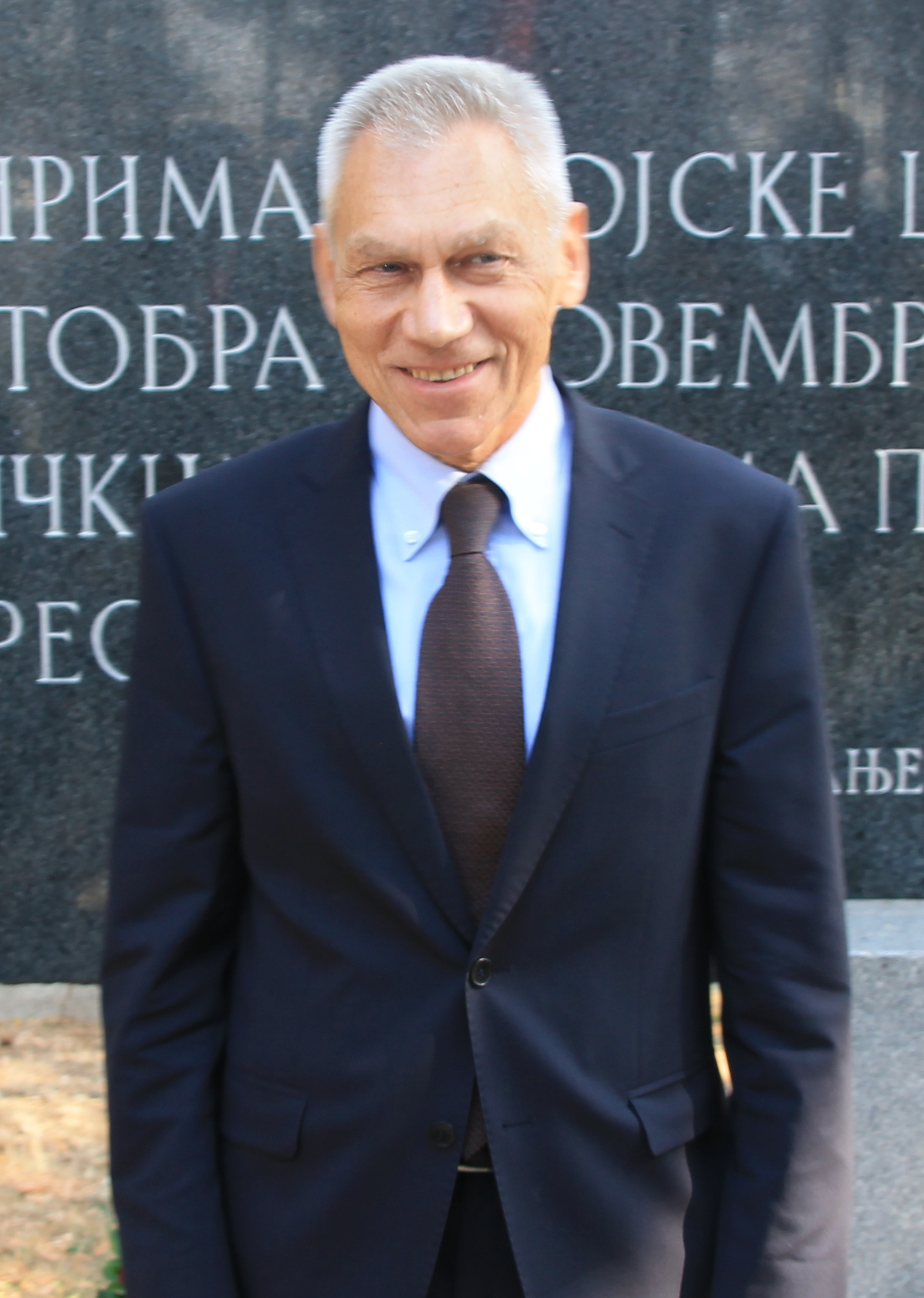
- Incumbent; Aleksandr Botsan-Kharchenko since 10 June 2019
- Ministry of Foreign Affairs; Embassy of Russia in Belgrade
- Style: His Excellency; The Honourable
- Reports to: Minister of Foreign Affairs
- Seat: Belgrade
- Appointer: President of Russia
- Term length: At the pleasure of the president
- Website: Embassy of Russia in Serbia

The ambassador of Russia to Serbia is the official representative of the president and the government of the Russian Federation to the president and the government of Serbia.

The ambassador and his staff work at large in the Embassy of Russiain Belgrade. The current Russian ambassador to Serbia is Aleksandr Botsan-Kharchenko, incumbent since 10 June 2019.

== History ==
Diplomatic relations between the forerunners of the modern states of Serbia and Russia date back to the early nineteenth century. The Russian Empire supported the Principality of Serbia against the Ottoman Empire. Prince Vasily Dolgorukov was sent with a special mission in 1837, and in 1838, Russia opened a consulate in Belgrade, upgraded to a consulate general in 1839. Gerasim Vashchenko was appointed the first consul, later consul general, to Serbia.

Diplomatic exchanges continued throughout the nineteenth century and into the twentieth, but were broken off after the October Revolution in 1917 brought the Bolshevik regime to power. Over the next few decades the Soviet Union was established, incorporating Russia, while Serbia became part of the Kingdom of Yugoslavia. The Soviet Union established relations with Yugoslavia and appointed ambassadors to it from 1940 onwards. The dissolution of the Soviet Union occurred in 1991, while the then Socialist Federal Republic of Yugoslavia broke up in 1992. The Republic of Serbia remained one of the two surviving entities of the Federal Republic of Yugoslavia, along with the Republic of Montenegro, being known as the state of Serbia and Montenegro from 2003. In 2006 Montenegro voted for independence, and became the independent state of Montenegro. The incumbent ambassador to Serbia and Montenegro, Aleksandr Alekseyev, continued as ambassador to Serbia, while a new ambassador, Yakov Gerasimov, was appointed ambassador to Montenegro in 2007.

== List of representatives ==
=== Russian Empire ===
Name	Title	Appointment	Termination	Notes
Vasily Dolgorukov	Special mission	1837	1837	
Gerasim Vashchenko	Consul before April 1839; Consul-General after April 1839	February 1838	May 1843	
Yakov Danilevsky	Consul-General	May 1843	1849	
Dmitry Lyovshin	Consul-General	1849	1851	
Fyodor Tumansky	Consul-General	1851	5 July 1853	
Nikolai Mukhin	Consul-General	1853	1856	
Mikhail Milashevich	Consul-General	1856	1860	
Aleksandr Vlangali	Consul-General	26 September 1860	27 July 1863	
Nikolai Shishkin	Consul-General; Also diplomatic agent after 4 May 1868	8 August 1863	25 March 1875	
Nikolai Kartsov	Consul-General and diplomatic agent	25 March 1875	7 August 1877	
Aleksandr Persiani	Consul-General and diplomatic agent until 12 August 1878; Resident minister 12 August 1878 - 10 March 1889; Envoy after 10 March 1889	7 August 1877	13 April 1895	
Anatoly Neklyudov	Chargé d'affaires	1894	25 April 1895	
Roman Rosen	Envoy	25 April 1895	4 February 1897	
Alexander Izvolsky	Envoy	4 February 1897	11 November 1897	
Valery Zhadovsky	Envoy	11 November 1897	16 November 1899	
Nikolai Charykov	Envoy	16 September 1900	1904	
Vladimir Murayov-Apostol-Korobin	Chargé d'affaires	1903	1904	
Konstantin Gubastov	Envoy	1904	1906	
Vasily Sergeyev	Envoy	1906	1909	
Nicholas Hartwig	Envoy	17 July 1909	10 July 1914	
Vasily Shtrandman	Chargé d'affaires	10 July 1914	1914	
Grigory Trubetskoy	Envoy	12 July 1914	1916	
Boris Pelekhin	Chargé d'affaires	1915	1915	
Boris Tatishchev	Envoy	1916	1917	
Boris Pelekhin	Chargé d'affaires	1917	1917	

=== Russian Federation ===
Name	Title	Appointment	Termination	Notes
Aleksandr Alekseyev	Ambassador	5 June 2006	27 March 2008	
Aleksandr Konuzin	Ambassador	27 March 2008	26 September 2012	Credentials presented on 18 April 2008
Aleksandr Chepurin	Ambassador	26 September 2012	10 June 2019	Credentials presented on 22 November 2012
Aleksandr Botsan-Kharchenko	Ambassador	10 June 2019		Credentials presented on 22 July 2019
