= Vasily Malinovsky =

Russian diplomat and publicist

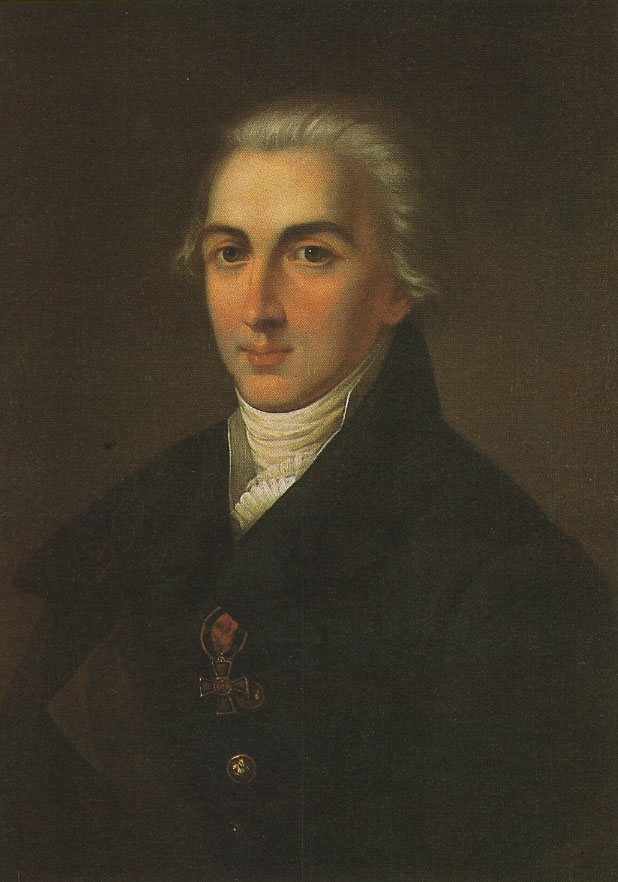
- Education: Imperial Moscow University (1781)

Vasily Fyodorovich Malinovsky (Russian: Василий Фёдорович Малиновский; (1765 — 1814) was a Russian diplomat and publicist. He was the brother of Alexey Fyodorovich Malinovsky and Paul Fyodorovich Malinovsky, and the father of Ivan Vasilyevich Malinovsky, a lyceum schoolmate of Pushkin's.

== Biography ==
Malinovsky graduated from the philosophy faculty of Moscow State University, where his father once worked. He had excellent knowledge of Greek, ancient Greek, Latin, Turkish, French and English. Malinovsky was especially influenced by Nikolay Novikov. From an early age he was attracted to the fight against despotism. Having strong command of English, he was appointed to the staff of the Russian diplomatic mission to England. In 1791, he was married to Sophia Andreevna Samborskaya. Upon return to Russia, he was appointed to the peace congress at Yassi to conduct diplomacy at the end of the Russo-Turkish War. In 1800, Malinovsky was appointed as consul to the Moldavian principality, where he was widely liked.

Upon return to Moscow in 1802, Malinovsky published the journal Fall Evenings («Осенние вечера»), where he published his essays "On War", "Love of Russia", "History of Russia", "Personal Side" («Своя сторона»). Under a pseudonym V.M., published "Thoughts on War and Peace". In 1802, Malinovsky also appealed to Count Kochubey with a project for the emancipation of serfs, one of the first emancipation proposals in Russia.

Malinovsky helped to finance and administer a lyceum at Tsarskoe Selo until the Napoleonic War of 1812. He died on March 23, 1814, and is buried in the Okhtinsky Cemetery. In 1964, a Soviet memorial plaque was placed on his tombstone.
