= Yamagata–Lobanov Agreement =

1896 treaty between Japan and Russia

The Yamagata–Lobanov Agreement (山縣・ロバノフ協定, Yamagata-Robanofu Kyōtei)(Russian: Протокол Лобанова — Ямагаты), signed in Saint Petersburg on 9 June 1896, was the third agreement signed between the Empire of Japan and the Empire of Russia concerning disputes regarding their sphere of influence over Korea.

With pro-Japanese and pro-Russian factions within the Joseon dynasty competing for power, the increasingly unstable political situation in Korea was endangering the economic and strategic interests of both Japan and Russia. After the assassination of Empress Myeongseong, Korean Emperor Gojong had taken refuge in the Russian consulate in Seoul at the invitation of Russian envoy Karl Ivanovich Weber, and Russia had thus attained a paramount influence over Korean politics at the time. This was confirmed in the Komura-Waeber Memorandum, which granted Russia the right to station four companies of troops in Korea, and required that Japan recognize Korea's new "pro-Russian faction" cabinet led by Yi Wan-yong.

Visiting during the coronation ceremonies for Russian Tsar Nicholas II, the Japanese delegation discussed the growing friction over Korea, and proposed that the Korean Peninsula be divided at the 39th parallel, should Japanese and Russian troops be forced to occupy Korea. The proposal was rejected, but the concept was resurrected by Soviet premier Joseph Stalin many years later at the Yalta Conference negotiations with the United States during World War II.

The Yamagata–Lobanov Agreement was signed in Saint Petersburg by ex-Prime Minister of Japan Yamagata Aritomo, and Russian Foreign Minister, Prince Alexei Lobanov-Rostovsky. The Agreement in effect guaranteed Korean independence through a tacit co-protectorate maintained by both Japan and Russia, with the aim of preserving Korea as a buffer state between Japan, and Russian interests in Manchuria and the Russian Maritime Provinces. The Agreement also stated a joint intention to encourage fiscal reform in Korea, promote the formation of a modern police and army, and to maintain telegraph lines.

The Agreement had two non-public provisions. In the first, Japan and Russia affirmed their mutual right to send additional troops to Korea in the event of any major disturbance, and in the second, both countries affirmed their rights to station troops in Korea until such time that Korea had its own modern army equipped to handle such disturbances. When Yamagata agreed to the terms of the agreement with Lobanov, he was unaware that only a few days earlier, the Russians had signed the Li-Lobanov Treaty with China, a de facto alliance against Japan, in which Russia gained unrestricted access to Manchuria and a lease over the Liaotung Peninsula.

The Yamagata–Lobanov Agreement was superseded by the Nishi-Rosen Agreement of 1898.

== See also ==
- Nishi-Rosen Agreement
- Russo-Japanese War
