= List of ambassadors of Russia to Montenegro =

Ambassador of the Russian Federation to Montenegro
- Emblem of the Russian Foreign Ministry
- Incumbent; Aleksandr Lukashik since 10 April 2025
- Ministry of Foreign Affairs; Embassy of Russia in Podgorica
- Style: His Excellency; The Honourable
- Reports to: Minister of Foreign Affairs
- Seat: Podgorica
- Appointer: President of Russia
- Term length: At the pleasure of the president
- Website: Embassy of Russia in Montenegro

The ambassador of Russia to Montenegro is the official representative of the president and the government of the Russian Federation to the president and the government of Montenegro.

The ambassador and his staff work at large in the Russian embassy in Podgorica. The current Russian ambassador to Montenegro is Aleksandr Lukashik, incumbent since 10 April 2025.

== History of diplomatic relations ==
Diplomatic relations between the forerunners of the modern states of Montenegro and Russia date back to the early nineteenth century. The Russian Empire supported the Prince-Bishopric of Montenegro against French incursions during the Napoleonic Wars, with Marko Ivelich and Stepan Sankovsky acting as diplomatic agents in the early 1800s. Aleksandr Vlangali served as head of a special mission to Montenegro between 1858 and 1859, following the establishment of the Principality of Montenegro, and during its campaigns against Ottoman forces. Long-term exchange of diplomats was only finalised in 1878, when Russia opened a diplomatic mission in the-then capital of Cetinje. Aleksandr Ionin was appointed the first resident minister on 12 August 1878.

Diplomatic exchanges continued throughout the nineteenth century and into the twentieth, but were broken off after the October Revolution in 1917 brought the Bolshevik regime to power. Over the next few decades the Soviet Union was established, incorporating Russia, while Montenegro became part of the Kingdom of Yugoslavia. The Soviet Union established relations with Yugoslavia and appointed ambassadors to it from 1940 onwards. The dissolution of the Soviet Union occurred in 1991, while the then Socialist Federal Republic of Yugoslavia broke up in 1992. The Republic of Montenegro remained one of the two surviving entities of the Federal Republic of Yugoslavia, along with the Republic of Serbia, being known as the state of Serbia and Montenegro from 2003. In 2006 Montenegro voted for independence, and became the independent state of Montenegro. The incumbent ambassador to Serbia and Montenegro, Aleksandr Alekseyev, continued as ambassador to Serbia, while a new ambassador, Yakov Gerasimov, was appointed ambassador to Montenegro in 2007.

== List of representatives of Russia to Montenegro (1805–present) ==
=== Russian Empire to the Prince-Bishopric of Montenegro (1805–1808) ===
Name	Title	Appointment	Termination	Notes
Marko Ivelich	Special mission	1805	1806	
Stepan Sankovsky	Special mission	1805	1808	

=== Russian Empire to the Principality of Montenegro (1858–1917) ===
Name	Title	Appointment	Termination	Notes
Aleksandr Vlangali	Special mission	13 June 1858	14 January 1859	
Aleksandr Ionin	Resident minister	12 August 1878	2 July 1883	
Aleksandr Koyander	Resident minister	2 July 1883	26 February 1884	
Kimon Argiropulo	Resident minister	3 July 1884	1 July 1897	
Konstantin Gubastov	Resident minister	5 July 1897	8 October 1900	
Pyotr Vlasov	Resident minister	27 November 1900	8 August 1902	
Andrey Shcheglov	Resident minister	16 August 1902	7 January 1905	
Yuri Solovyov	Chargé d'affaires	January 1905	May 1905	
Pyotr Maksimov	Resident minister	21 January 1905	31 December 1909	
Nikolai Dyachenko	Chargé d'affaires	1909	1910	
Sergey Arsenyev	Envoy	31 December 1909	25 May 1912	
Aleksandr Girs	Resident minister	1912	21 August 1915	
Nikolai Obnorsky	Chargé d'affaires	1916	1916	
Lev Islavin	Envoy	1916	1917	

=== Russian Federation to Montenegro (2007–present) ===
Name	Title	Appointment	Termination	Notes
Yakov Gerasimov	Ambassador	29 January 2007	30 March 2011	
Andrey Nesterenko	Ambassador	30 March 2011	30 June 2015	
Sergey Gritsay	Ambassador	30 June 2015	1 July 2019	
Vladislav Maslennikov	Ambassador	1 July 2019	12 September 2024	Credentials presented on 9 September 2019
Pyotr Svirin	Chargé d'affaires	12 September 2024	10 April 2025	
Aleksandr Lukashik	Ambassador	10 April 2025		Credentials presented on 9 June 2025
