= Björkö =

Björkö (Swedish for "Birch Island") may refer to:

== Places ==
Sweden

- Björkö, Ekerö, a Lake Mälaren island in Ekerö Municipality, Stockholm County, the location for the World Heritage Site Birka
- Björkö, Öckerö, an island in Öckerö Municipality, Västra Götaland County
- Björkö, Haninge, an island in Haninge Municipality, Stockholm County
- Björkö, the southern part of Väddö island in northern Roslagen, Norrtälje Municipality, Stockholm County. (Also a former parish there.)
- Björkö, Västervik, an island in Västervik Municipality, Kalmar County

Finland

- Björkö, Houtskär, one of the main islands of the former municipality Houtskär in the Archipelago Sea
- Björkö (Korsholm), a Kvarken island in Korsholm Municipality, Ostrobothnia
- Björkö, Kumlinge, an island and a village in Kumlinge Municipality in the Åland Islands
- Björkö, Korpo, an island in the former municipality Korpo in the Archipelago Sea

Russia

- The Swedish name for Primorsk, Leningrad Oblast and the Beryozovye Islands in the Leningrad Oblast

== History ==
- The Treaty of Björkö, signed by Nicholas II of Russia and William II of the German Empire in 1905 and named after Björkö (now the Beryozovye Islands)
