= Keskisaari =

Keskisaari (in Finnish ‘keski’ means middle and ‘saari’ means island) is a place name and family name in Finland. There are a number of places called Keskisaari around Finland, including Lappee (Lapvesi) and Koivisto (Björkö) in Karelia and Maaninka.

== Origin ==
In Maaninka Keskisaari there is an early Iron Age burial site.

== Present ==
The Koivisto Keskisaari is no longer a part of Finland since the Second World War.
