= Nishi Tokujirō =

Meji Japan statesman and diplomat

Senior Second Rank Baron Nishi Tokujirō
- 西 徳二郎
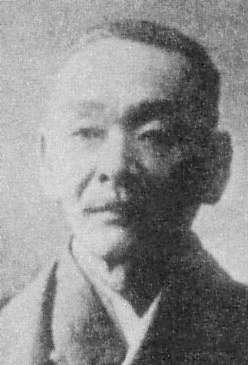
- Baron Nishi Tokujirō

Minister for Foreign Affairs
- In office 6 November 1897 – 30 June 1898
- Prime Minister: Matsukata Masayoshi; Itō Hirobumi
- Preceded by: Ōkuma Shigenobu
- Succeeded by: Ōkuma Shigenobu

Member of the Privy Council
- In office 25 November 1901 – 13 March 1912
- Monarch: Meiji
- In office 18 March 1897 – 6 November 1897
- Monarch: Meiji

Personal details
- Born: 4 September 1847 Kagoshima, Satsuma, Japan
- Died: 13 March 1912 (aged 64) Tokyo, Japan
- Resting place: Aoyama Cemetery
- Children: Takeichi Nishi
- Education: Saint Petersburg Imperial University
- Known for: Nishi–Rosen Agreement

Baron Nishi Tokujirō (西 徳二郎; September 4, 1847 – March 13, 1912) was a statesman and diplomat in Meiji period Japan.

== Career ==
Nishi was from a samurai family of the Satsuma Domain (present-day Kagoshima Prefecture). After the Meiji Restoration, he joined the Ministry of Foreign Affairs of the new Meiji government, and was sent as a student to study the Russian language in St Petersburg, Russia in 1870. From 1870-1873, he traveled extensively through Central Asia, visiting Bukhara, Samarkand, Tashkent, Ürümqi and other areas of Xinjiang. After serving as First Secretary at the Japanese legation in Paris, France in 1874, he returned to Japan.

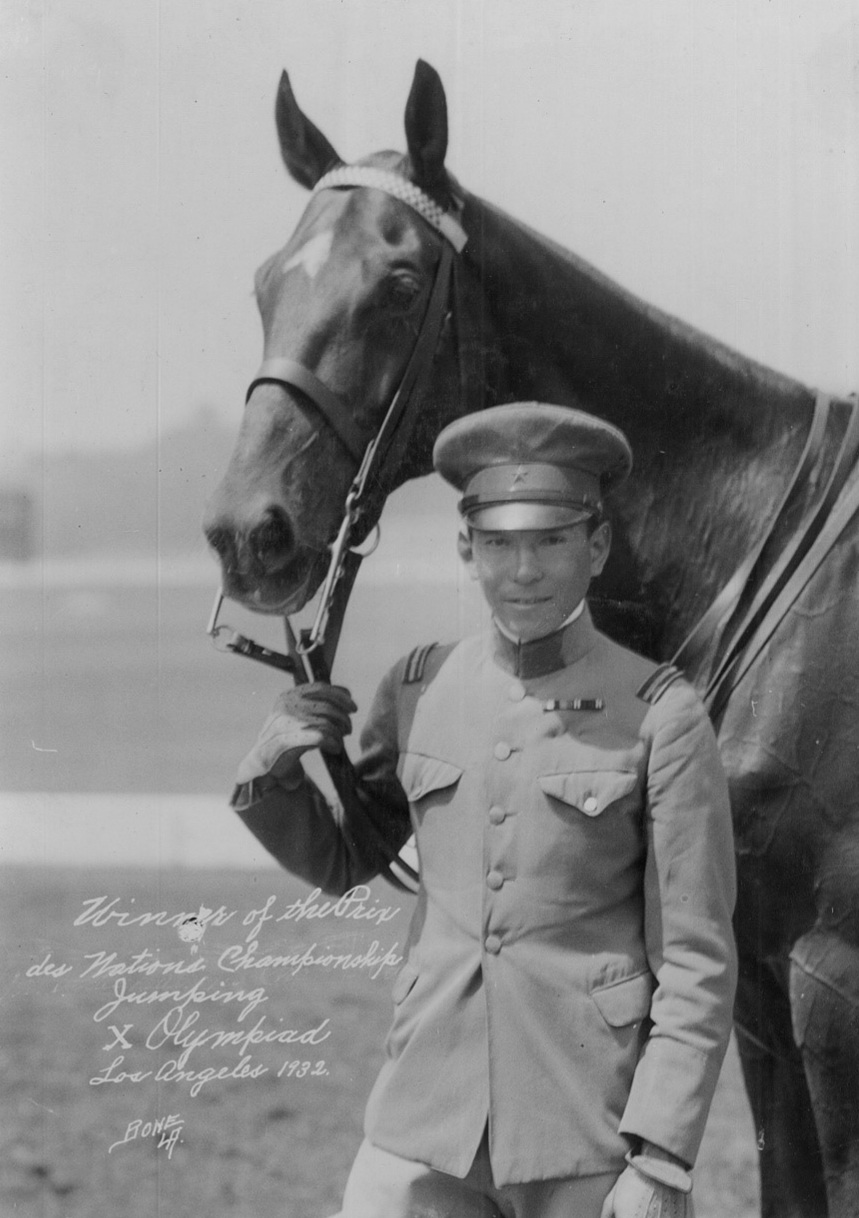
Nishi's son Takeichi with Olympic steed, Uranus

In June 1886, he was appointed council-general of the Japanese legation to Russia, Sweden and Norway and was elevated in rank to danshaku (baron) under the kazoku peerage system. In August 1896, he became ambassador to Russia. In March 1897, he was appointed to the Privy Council.

From November 6, 1897, to January 12, 1898, Nishi served as Foreign Minister under the 2nd Matsukata administration and again as Foreign Minister from January 12, 1898 to June 30, 1898, under the 3rd Itō administration. He negotiated the "Third Russo-Japanese Agreement" (the Nishi–Rosen Agreement) on April 25, 1898, in which Russia acknowledged Japan's supremacy in Korea in exchange for Japan's acknowledgement of Russia's sphere of interest in Manchuria. In October 1899, he was appointed ambassador to Qing dynasty China, and was at the Japanese legation in Beijing during the Boxer Rebellion.

In December 1899, he was awarded the Order of the Rising Sun, 1st class.

He was the father of Takeichi Nishi, an Imperial Japanese Army cavalry officer who won a gold medal in the 1932 Summer Olympics and died in the Battle of Iwo Jima.

Political offices
Preceded by Ōkuma Shigenobu	Minister for Foreign Affairs of Japan; November 6, 1897 – June 30, 1898	Succeeded by Ōkuma Shigenobu
