= Takeichi Nishi =

Japanese soldier and athlete (1902–1945)

Baron Takeichi Nishi
- 西 竹一
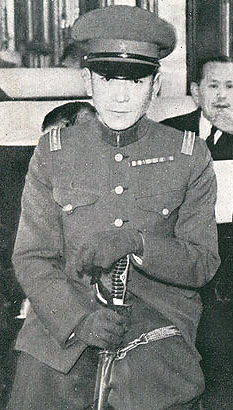
- Born: July 12, 1902; Tokyo, Japan
- Died: c. March 22, 1945 (aged 42); Iwo Jima, Japan
- Education: Tokyo First Junior High School; Hiroshima Army Cadet School; Tokyo Central Cadet Academy; Imperial Japanese Army Academy; Army Cavalry School
- Children: Yasunori Nishi
- Father: Tokujirō Nishi
- Military career
- Allegiance: Empire of Japan
- Branch: Imperial Japanese Army
- Service years: 1924–1945
- Rank: Colonel (posthumous)
- Nickname: "Baron Nishi"
- Units: First Cavalry Regiment; 16th Narashino Cavalry Regiment; Tokachi Subdivision
- Commands: 26th Tank Regiment, Mudanjiang
- Conflicts: World War II; Battle of Iwo Jima (PKIA)
- Awards: Order of the Rising Sun, 3rd class
- Sports career
- Country: Empire of Japan
- Sport: Equestrian
Medal record
Olympic Games
Gold medal – first place	1932 Los Angeles	Individual show jumping

Colonel Baron Takeichi Nishi (西 竹一, Nishi Takeichi; July 12, 1902 – c. March 22, 1945) was an Imperial Japanese Army officer, equestrian show jumper, and Olympic Gold Medalist at the 1932 Los Angeles Olympics. Near the end of the Second World War he commanded the 26th Tank Regiment during the Battle of Iwo Jima and died during the defense of the island.

== Family and early life ==
Takeichi Nishi was born on July 12, 1902, in the Azabu district of Tokyo. He was the illegitimate third son of Tokujirō Nishi, a danshaku (baron under the kazoku peerage system). His mother was not married to Tokujirō and was forced to leave the house soon after giving birth. His father had various high-level positions in the Ministry of Foreign Affairs and Imperial Privy Council, leading up to ambassador to China's Qing dynasty during the Boxer Rebellion.

Nishi went to Gakushuin pre-school and, while in elementary school, frequently got into fights with students of nearby Bancho Elementary School. In 1912, at the age of 10, he succeeded to the title of Baron upon the death of his father. In 1915, he entered Tokyo First Junior High School (now Hibiya High School) in accordance with the dying wishes of his father; his classmates included Hideo Kobayashi, future pre-eminent literary critic, and Hisatsune Sakomizu, who would be Chief Cabinet Secretary in 1945.

In September 1917, Nishi entered Hiroshima Army Cadet School, a military preparatory school established on Prussian models, and in 1920 took courses at Tokyo Central Cadet Academy. One of his classmates was Masanobu Tsuji, formerly head student of the Nagoya Academy. He completed his studies at Central Cadet School in six months in April 1920, due to the reorganization of the military schools, and began courses at the Imperial Japanese Army Academy. Midway through his studies, he was attached to the First Cavalry Regiment based in Setagaya, Tokyo. In 1924, he graduated from the academy, the 13th of the 19 students in his class, and was commissioned a second lieutenant in October. He went on to the First Cavalry after graduating from Army Cavalry School. He was promoted to lieutenant in October 1927.

== Uranus and Olympics competition ==
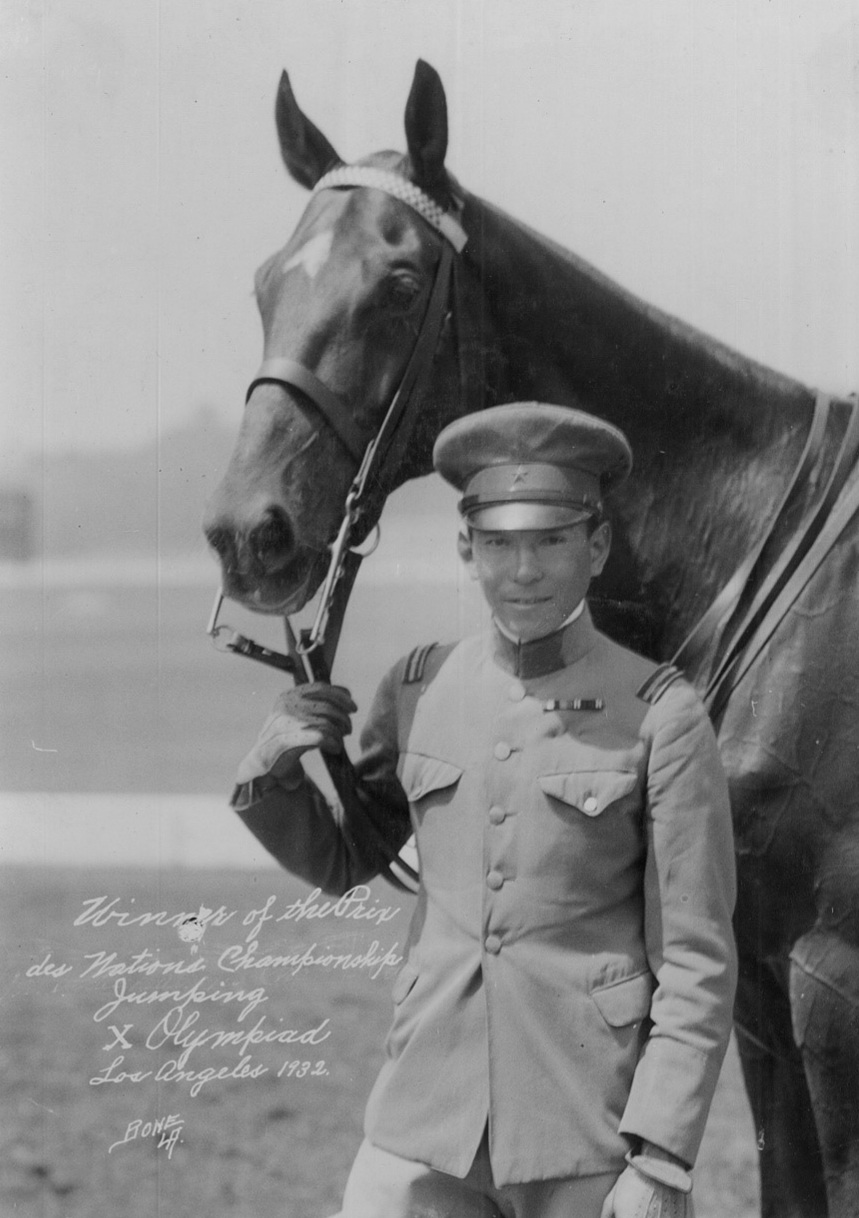
Nishi with his Olympic steed, Uranus

In 1930, Nishi encountered what would be his favorite horse, Uranus, while in Italy. As the army wouldn't pay for the horse, Nishi bought Uranus with his personal funds. Nishi and Uranus competed in competitions around Europe, doing well. In 1932, when Nishi was a first lieutenant, they participated in the 1932 Summer Olympics in Los Angeles, winning a gold medal in Equestrian at the 1932 Summer Olympics show jumping individual. His victory broke through the general hostility towards Japan that followed from the Mukden incident and invasion of Manchuria. Westerners, especially Americans, referred to him as "Baron Nishi". He was also popular among Japanese Americans, who were ostracized by American society in this period.

During his stay in Los Angeles, Nishi became the topic of conversation both for his love of driving convertibles around town and for becoming part of the social circle led by Charlie Chaplin, Mary Pickford and Douglas Fairbanks.

After the Olympics, he was reassigned to the 16th Narashino Cavalry Regiment and promoted to be a cavalry instructor at the regimental school with the rank of captain, which he was promoted to in August 1933.

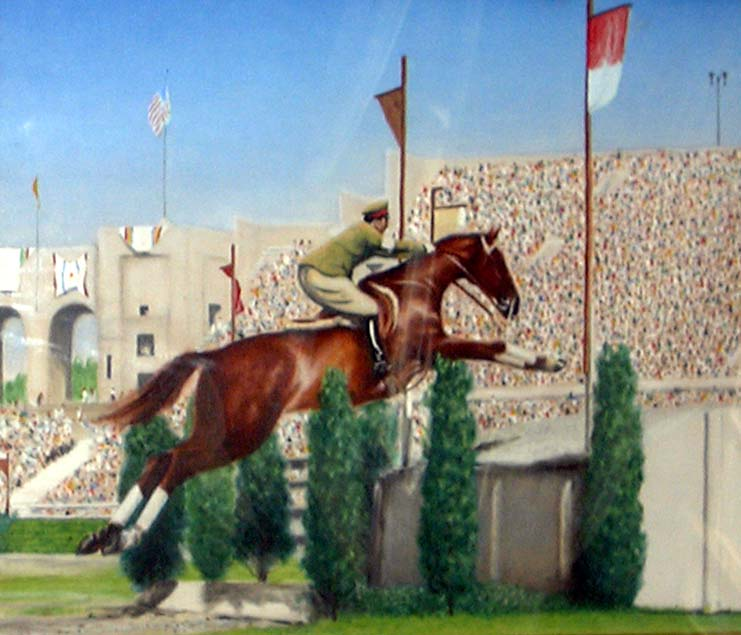
Takeichi Nishi with Uranus at the 1932 Summer Games

Nishi and Uranus participated in the 1936 Summer Olympics in Berlin, Germany, where Nishi fell off his horse mid-course. There is speculation this was intentional and done for the benefit of the host country, Nazi Germany, with whom Japan would sign the 1940 Tripartite Pact, forming the Axis Powers. The 1936 Show Jumping individual event gold medal was won by Germany. Following this, Nishi was reposted to the Tokachi Subdivision of the department responsible for supply of military horses. He was promoted to major in March 1939.

== War years to Iwo Jima ==
In this period, Japan was cutting its cavalry forces and forming tank regiments. Nishi was reassigned the regimental commander of the 26th Tank Regiment, based in Mudanjiang, in northern Manchukuo on defensive duties. He eventually gained the rank of lieutenant colonel in August 1943.

In 1944, the 26th Tank Regiment was reassigned to the defense of Iwo Jima under the command of Lieutenant General Tadamichi Kuribayashi. On July 18, 1944, while en route from Pusan to Iwo Jima, the ship Nisshu Maru transporting the regiment was struck by torpedoes fired by submarine USS Cobia (SS-245). While only two soldiers were killed, all 28 of the tanks in the regiment were lost.

Nishi briefly returned to Tokyo to obtain replacement tanks, eventually receiving 22 of them. While there, he borrowed the car of Daijiro Kawasaki, future CEO of Daihyaku Insurance (eventually bought out by Manulife Financial), a close friend and a son of the Kawasaki Heavy Industries zaibatsu. When he had a chance, he visited his horse Uranus, who remained at the Bajikōen Horse Grounds, Setagaya.

== Battle of Iwo Jima ==
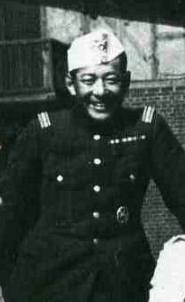
Nishi as young Army officer

On Iwo Jima in 1945, Nishi commanded the 26th Tank Regiment under the Ogasawara Corps (IJA 109th Division). He would walk about the island wearing his Hermès brand riding boots and carrying his favorite crop. The regimental headquarters, which was located near the village of Maruman, was moved to the eastern part of the island when the battle began. Due to the topography of the island, some of the Type 97 Chi-Ha medium and Type 95 Ha-Go light tanks were placed in hull defilade (buried up to their turrets) and used as fortified emplacements, in particular, against the American M4 Shermans.

After extensive air and naval gunfire bombardment, the United States Marine Corps launched an amphibious assault on Iwo Jima starting February 19. The American forces, who knew that Nishi was an enemy commander, broadcast daily appeals for him to surrender, stating that the world would regret losing "Baron Nishi"; Nishi never responded to those appeals. The American intelligence officer responsible for this attempt was Sy Bartlett of the 315th Bomber Wing out of Guam, who would later write the novel and film screenplay Twelve O'Clock High (1949). In 1966, Bartlett visited Nishi's widow in Tokyo and paid his respects at Yasukuni Shrine.

== Death ==
The circumstances of Nishi's death are unknown and subject to competing theories. One theory is that he found himself in the midst of enemy forces on the morning of March 21 and was killed by machine gun fire while moving to the regimental headquarters. Another is that he and his aide killed themselves with their pistols near Ginmyōsui or Futagoiwa. Yet another is that he was burnt to death by American flamethrowers on March 22, or that he and several subordinates carried out a final banzai attack and were killed in action.

Nishi was 42 years old at the time of the battle.

== Legacy ==
Nishi was posthumously promoted to the rank of colonel and awarded the Order of the Rising Sun, Third Class, Gold Rays with Neck Ribbon. A cenotaph was later erected by his family in the Aoyama Cemetery in Tokyo. His son Yasunori Nishi succeeded him as the 3rd Baron Nishi. His hereditary title was abolished during the American occupation of Japan after the war. In 2012 Yasunori Nishi was appointed vice-chairman of Iwo Jima Association of Japan and attended the 68th Reunion of Honor held on the island in 2013.

Biographer Ōno Kaoru said of Nishi, "Few people comprehended him and only Uranus understood him."

After the war a small monument was erected on the eastern coast of Iwo Jima near where Nishi is believed to have died. In 1988, due to concerns over high geothermal heat and the difficulty of access, construction started on another more elaborate memorial on a cliff around 250 meters north of the original monument. It was noted to still be under construction by San Diego Reader journalist Ray Westberg during his visit to the island in 1989. The completed memorial features a plaque on the front with the inscription:

"The cherry blossoms of the warriors' hearts bloom in Iwo Jima, never to be scattered".

In 1995 another plaque was installed on the back of the monument in commemoration of the 50th anniversary of the end of the war.

Nishi's gold medal from the 1932 Los Angeles Olympics is on display at the Chichibunomiya Memorial Sports Museum in Funabashi.

In 1964, Nishi's widow gifted his favorite riding crop to the Amateur Athletic Foundation of Los Angeles. In 2021, the AAFLA's successor organization the LA84 Foundation returned the crop to Nishi's grandson on the occasion of the 2020 Tokyo Summer Olympics.

Uranus died one week after Nishi at the Tokyo Equestrian Park, he was later buried at the Army Cavalry School in Tsudanuma but the grave was destroyed in a US bombing raid. In 1990, Uranus was commemorated at the War Horse Memorial in the History and Folklore Museum in Honbetsu, Hokkaidō.

== In popular culture ==
In the 2006 film Letters from Iwo Jima, Baron Nishi was played by Korean-Japanese actor Tsuyoshi Ihara. The film portrays Nishi as being close friends with General Tadamichi Kuribayashi, but in reality, the two had some disagreements. Nishi ignored Kuribayashi's prohibition on using precious water to wash tanks, as well as the general's orders to punish soldiers who did so. Regardless, the popularity (mainly in Japan) of both men as defenders of Iwo Jima grew. An anecdote repeated by Kakehashi Kumiko in the February 2006 issue of Bungei Shunju magazine is that in the final days of the battle, as the number of commanding officers who refused to put their men in caves increased, Nishi agreed that they should go out and fight together. In the 2006 movie, Nishi uses some of the scarce medical supplies on a wounded US Marine he is questioning. Ōno Kaoru's biography of Nishi gives credence to this as an actual event. The film also portrays Nishi as having taken his own life after being wounded and blinded during the battle.

== Awards and decorations ==
- Order of the Rising Sun, Third Class, Gold Rays with Neck Ribbon (posthumous award)

Nishi's other decorations include:

- Order of the Sacred Treasure, Fifth or Sixth Class
- 1937–1945 China Incident War Medal
- Special Membership Medal of the Japanese Red Cross Society
- German Horseman's Badge (Nazi Germany)

== References and other works ==
Translations of Japanese language titles are approximate.

- Shiroyama Saburō, 硫黄島に死す (To die on Iwo Jima), Shinchosha, 1984, ISBN 978-4-10-113316-4 (in Japanese)
- Ōno Kaoru, オリンポスの使徒「バロン西伝説はなぜ生れたか」 (Disciple of Olympus: Why was the legend of Baron Nishi born?), Bungei Shunju, 1984, ASIN B000J74FDC (in Japanese)
- Futabashi Shingo (images by Kisaki Takashi), 風と踊れ！ 時代を疾走ぬけた男 バロン西 (Dance with the Wind! Baron Nishi, the man who raced to the end of an era), 2003 comic published by Shueisha (in Japanese)
- Zaloga, Steven J. Japanese Tanks 1939-45. (2007) Osprey. ISBN 978-1-84603-091-8.
