= Aleksey Yermolov (politician) =

Russian politician

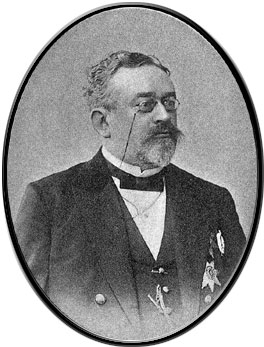
Aleksey Yermolov

Aleksey Sergeyevich Yermolov (Russian: Алексей Сергеевич Ермолов; 12 November 1847 – 4 January 1917) was a Russian politician.

Yermolov was born in 1847 (by some other sources in 1846). In 1866, he graduated from the Tsarskoye Selo Lyceum, in 1871, he became a Kandidat of agricultural sciences in the Petersburg Agricultural Institute. He worked as a senior editor of the statistical department and member of the Research Council of the Imperial Ministry for Agriculture. He was the leader of the expedition to study sheep husbandry in the Empire. From 1883 to 1892, he served as the head of the Indirect taxation department of the Ministry for Economics. In 1892, he became the Deputy to Ministry for Finance. In 1893, he became Minister of Agriculture and State Properties of Russian Empire and served until 1905. Since 1905, he was a member of State Council of Imperial Russia.

He was an active member of the Free Economic Society (Russian: Вольное Экономическое Общество) and published a lot of scientific articles in the Works of the Society. In 1878, he represented the society at the World Fair in Paris. From 1886 to 1888, he served as the vice-president of the Society. In 1899, Yermolov was elected a member of the Russian Academy of Sciences.

Yermolov and Sergei Witte were targets of the sharp criticism by Vladimir Lenin in his work What the "Friends of the People" Are and How They Fight the Social-Democrats. According to Lenin, Yermolov's opposition to migration as it could cause a shortage of labour for landowners, saying "What do the peasants exist for, if not to work and feed the idle landlords and their 'high-placed' servitors?"

== Some works ==
- «Новые исследования фосфоритов» (1867);
- «О добывании, переработке и употреблении кругляков ископаемой фосфорнокислой извести во Франции» (1870);
- «Фосфориты под Москвой и в Московской губернии» (1870);
- «Очерки побитюжья» (1871);
- «Высшее сельскохозяйственное образование в его отношениях к сельскому делу в России» (1872);
- «Организация теоретических и практических испытаний для решения вопроса об удобрении почв» (1872);
- «Recherches sur les gisements de phosphate de chaux fossile en Russie» (1873);
- «Сельскохозяйственное дело Европы и Америки на Венской всемирной выставке 1873 г. и в эпоху её» (1875);
- «Винокурение из стеблей кукурузы» (1878);
- «Из заграничной поездки» (1878);
- «Notice sur les céréales de la Russie» (1878);
- «Mémoire sur la production agricole de la Russie» (1878);
- «Организация полевого хозяйства» (2-е изд., 1891);
- «Сельскохозяйственно-статистическая литература на всемирной выставке в Париже 1878 г.» (1879);
- «Неурожай и народное бедствие» (1892).
- Под редакцией Ермолов напечатан перевод сочинения Ж. Билля: «Химические удобрения» (1872).
- С 1890 г. помещалась им в журнале «Русское Обозрение» сельскохозяйственная хроника; первая серия этих этюдов издана особо, под заглавием: «Современные сельскохозяйственные вопросы» (1891).
