= Beryozovye Islands =

Russian archipelago in the Gulf of Finland

Coordinates: 60.33°N 28.56°E

Designations

Ramsar Wetland
- Official name: Berezovye Islands, Gulf of Finland, Baltic Sea
- Designated: 13 September 1994
- Reference no.: 691

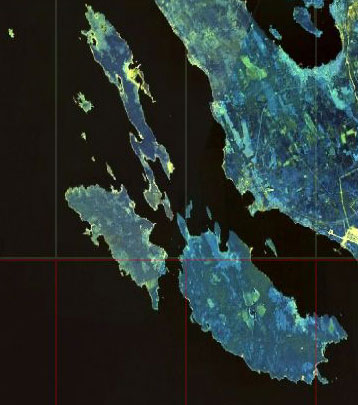

Beryozovye Islands (Russian: Берёзовые острова; Finnish: Koiviston saaret; Swedish: Björköarna, lit. 'the Birch Islands'), alternatively spelled Berezovye Islands, is an island group in Leningrad Oblast, Russia.

== Geography ==
The islands are situated at the head of the Gulf of Finland, just outside the town of Primorsk on the Karelian Isthmus. The total area of the group, stretching along the coast for 200 km, is 92 km^{2}. There are 15 islands in the group, the largest of which is Bolshoy Beryozovy (Large Beryozovy, Finnish: Koivistonsaari). Other islands include Zapadny Beryozovy (West Beryozovy, Finnish: Tiurinsaari) and Severny Beryozovy (North Beryozovy, Finnish: Piisaari).

== Environment ==
The archipelago is protected by the state as a seabird sanctuary and is one of the Russia's Ramsar sites. It has been designated an Important Bird Area (IBA) by BirdLife International because it supports populations of many species of waterfowl and gulls on passage.

== History ==
Before the Third Swedish Crusade (1293–1295), the islands paid tax to Novgorod; after the crusade they became Swedish. In 1721 they became part of Russia, and in 1812 they were restored to the Grand Duchy of Finland with the province of Vyborg. In independent Finland they belonged to the parish then called Koivisto (Swedish: Björkö). The main settlement on the islands was then called Saarenpää (Krasnoostrovskiy). The islands gave their name to the Treaty of Björkö (1905). After World War II, they were ceded by Finland to the Soviet Union. The whole historical Finnish population was expelled and replaced by a population of Soviet origin from September 1944 onwards. Place names were russified after 1947 concurrently with the rest of the formerly Finnish Karelian Isthmus occupied in 1944.

== See also ==
- Björkö (disambiguation)
- Keskisaari
