= Nishi–Rosen Agreement =

1898 treaty between Japan and Russia

Nishi-Rosen Agreement (西・ローゼン協定, Nishi-Rozen Kyōtei) was an agreement signed between the Empire of Japan and the Russian Empire on 25 April 1898 concerning disputes over Korea.

With Japan's victory in the First Sino-Japanese War, and increasing influence in domestic Korean politics, tensions continued to rise between Japan and Russia over political and economic control of Korea. The Agreement was signed in Tokyo by Japanese Foreign Minister Baron Nishi Tokujirō, and Russian Foreign Minister Baron Roman Romanovich Rosen. Under the terms of the Agreement, both nations agreed to refrain from interfering in domestic Korean politics, and to seek prior approval from each other before sending any military or financial advisors at the request of the Korean government. Russia pledged not to obstruct Japanese investment in the commercial and economic development of Korea, thus explicitly acknowledging Korea to be within Japan's sphere of influence. In return, Japan implicitly recognized Russia's lease of territory on the Liaodong Peninsula.

== See also ==
- Russo-Japanese War
- Yamagata–Lobanov Agreement
