= Ministry of Foreign Affairs of the Russian Empire =

Government ministry in imperial Russia

Ministry of Foreign Affairs
- Coat of Arms of the Russian Empire

Ministry overview
- Formed: 8 September 1802
- Preceding Ministry: Collegium of Foreign Affairs
- Dissolved: 2 March 1917
- Superseding Ministry: People's Commissariat for Foreign Affairs of the USSR
- Jurisdiction: Emperor of All Russia
- Headquarters: Saint Petersburg
- Ministry executive: Alexander Vorontsov (first) Mikhail Tereshchenko (last), Minister of Foreign Affairs
- Parent Ministry: Council of Ministers of the Russian Empire (1905-1917)
- Child Ministry: Collegium of Foreign Affairs (1802-1832)

The Ministry of Foreign Affairs of the Russian Empire (Russian: Министе́рство иностранных дел Российской империи) was a ministry of the Russian Empire responsible for its relations with foreign states from 1802 to 1917.

The Ministry was established by a decree of the Emperor Alexander I of Russia on 8 September 1802 by Manifesto "On the establishment of ministries." With the formation of the Ministry of Foreign Affairs, the preceding Collegium of Foreign Affairs was not disbanded and continued to exist until April 1832 as a child agency of the Ministry. According to the decree "On the formation of the Ministry of Foreign Affairs" from 1832, the Ministry included; the council, the Asian Department, the Department of External Relations, the Department of Internal Affairs and the Department of Economic and Accounting Affairs, as well as three main archives: two in Saint Petersburg and one in Moscow.

The Ministry of Foreign Affairs became one of the ministries of the Council of Ministers from 1905 until its dissolution on 2 March 1917 after the February Revolution. However, remnants served as the foreign ministry of the short-lived Russian Provisional Government until October. Its role was eventually replaced by the People's Commissariat for Foreign Affairs of the Soviet Union in 1923.

The Ministry was known by the metonym "the Chorister's Bridge," based on its location next to that bridge in Saint Petersburg.

== Ministers ==
Name		Term of office		Head of State
1	Alexander Vorontsov	September 8, 1802	January 16, 1804	Alexander I
2	Adam Jerzy Czartoryski	January 16, 1804	Juny 17, 1806	Alexander I
3	Andreas Eberhard von Budberg	Juny 17, 1806	August 30, 1807	Alexander I
4	Nikolay Rumyantsev	February 12, 1808	August 1, 1814	Alexander I
5	Ioannis Kapodistrias (joint with Karl Nesselrode)	January 31, 1816	August 19, 1822	Alexander I
6	Ioannis Kapodistrias (joint with Karl Nesselrode)	January 31, 1816	August 19, 1822	Alexander I
7	Karl Nesselrode	1814	April 15, 1856	Alexander I
7	Karl Nesselrode	1814	April 15, 1856	Nicholas I
8	Alexander Gorchakov	April 15, 1856	9 April 1882	Alexander II
9	Nicholas de Giers	April 9, 1882	January 26, 1895	Alexander III
10	Alexei Lobanov-Rostovsky	March 18, 1895	August 30, 1896	Nicholas II
11	Nikolay Shishkin	September 1, 1896	January 13, 1897	Nicholas II
12	Mikhail Muravyov	January 13, 1897	June 21, 1900	Nicholas II
13	Vladimir Lambsdorff	January 6, 1901	May 11, 1906	Nicholas II
14	Alexander Izvolsky	May 11, 1906	October 11, 1910	Nicholas II
15	Sergey Sazonov	October 11, 1910	July 20, 1916	Nicholas II
16	Boris Stürmer	July 20, 1916	November 23, 1916	Nicholas II
17	Nikolay Pokrovsky	November 23, 1916	March 2, 1917	Nicholas II

=== Provisional Government/Russian Republic ===
Minister		Party	Term of Office		Prime Minister
18	Pavel Milyukov	Constitutional Democratic Party	March 2, 1917	May 1, 1917	George Lvov
19	Mikhail Tereshchenko	Independent	May 5, 1917	October 29, 1917	George Lvov
19	Mikhail Tereshchenko	Independent	May 5, 1917	October 29, 1917	Alexander Kerensky

== See also ==
- Minister of Foreign Affairs (Russia)#Russian Empire
