= Treaty of Björkö =

1905 secret treaty between Germany and Russia

Kaiser Wilhelm II	Tsar Nicholas II
Heinrich von Tchirschky	Aleksei Birilev

The Treaty of Björkö, also known as the Treaty of Koivisto, was a secret mutual defence agreement signed on 24 July 1905 in Björkö between Wilhelm II of the German Empire and Tsar Nicholas II of Russia. Although Wilhelm was the chief author, he acted without consulting his ministers. The treaty was quickly repudiated and never took effect.

== Secret meeting ==
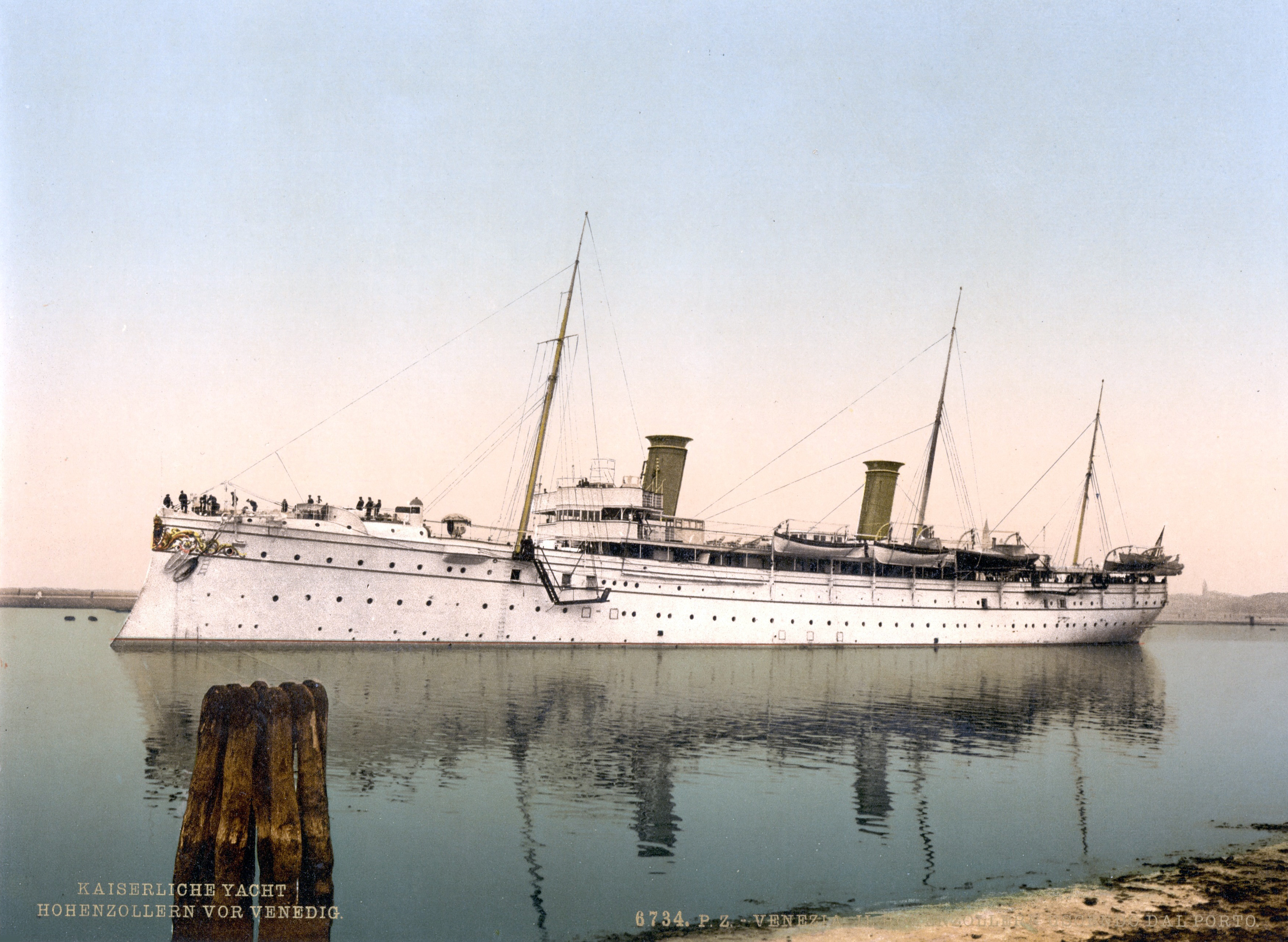
The Kaiser's yacht Hohenzollern.

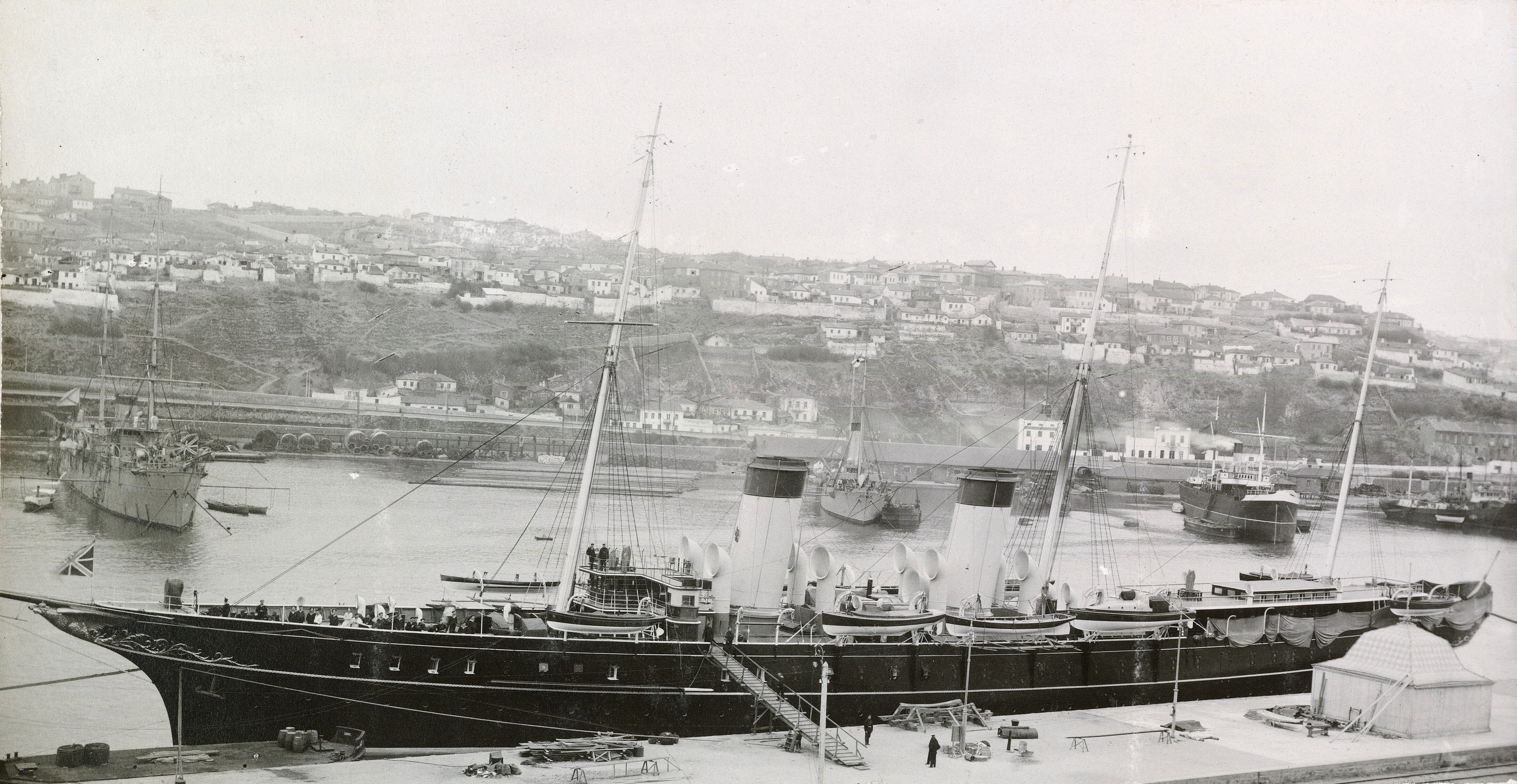
The Tsar's yacht Shtandart.

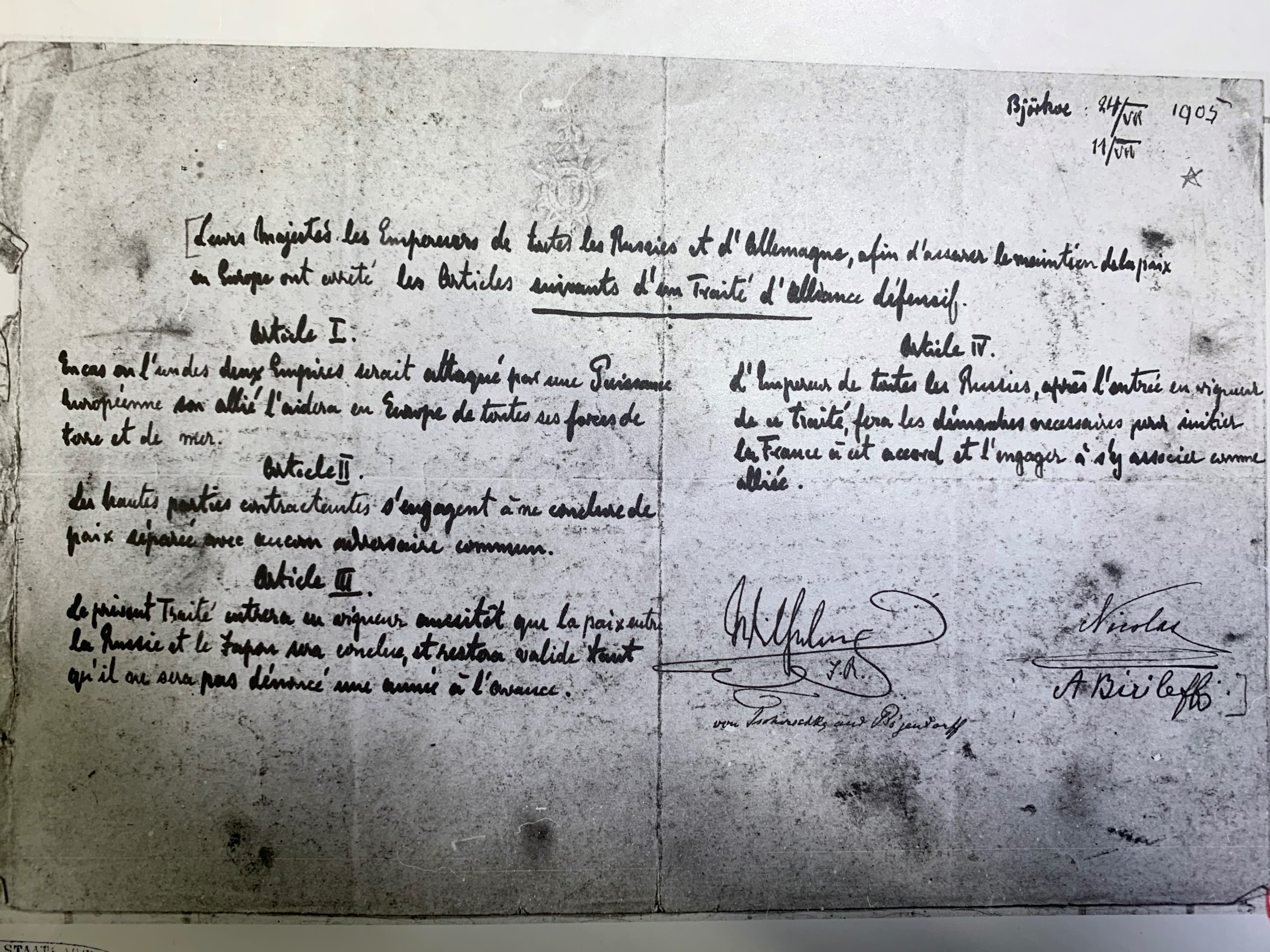
Treaty of Björkö

The mutual defence treaty was signed in secret at a meeting arranged by Wilhelm II only four days prior. On the evening of Sunday 23 July 1905, the Kaiser arrived at Koivisto Sound from Viipuri Bay in his yacht, the Hohenzollern. The yacht then dropped anchor near Tsar Nicholas' yacht, the Standart. Proof of the meeting's occurrence is provided by the telegrams they exchanged, known as the Willy–Nicky correspondence, which was made public in 1917 by the new revolutionary government in Russia.

== Treaty ==
The defence treaty consisted of four articles and was signed by Wilhelm II and Tsar Nicholas II. It was countersigned by Heinrich von Tschirschky, head of the German Foreign Office, and Naval Minister Aleksei Birilev:

Their Majesties the Emperors of all the Russias and Germany, in order to ensure the continuance of peace in Europe have decreed the following Articles of a Defensive Alliance Treaty.

=== Article I ===
In case one of the two Empires is attacked by a European Power, his ally will help it in Europe with all its land and sea forces.

=== Article II ===
High Contracting Parties undertake not to conclude separate peace with any common adversary.

=== Article III ===
The present Treaty shall enter into force as soon as peace between Russia and Japan is concluded and shall remain valid as long as it is not denounced a year in advance.

=== Article IV ===
The Emperor of all the Russias, after the entry into force of this treaty, will take the necessary steps to initiate France to this agreement and engage it to join as an ally.

=== Signature ===
Wilhelm I.R. Nicolas

Von Tschirschky und Brogendorff Birilev.

== Reaction ==
The treaty needed to be ratified by both the German and Russian governments.

=== Germany ===
The German motive for the treaty was to weaken the Franco-Russian Alliance and enhance Germany's position towards Britain. The treaty was initially designed as a global mutual defence agreement, but Wilhelm's addition of the words "in Europe" in the first article limited its scope to Europe. This amendment caused a disagreement between the Kaiser and the German Reich Chancellor, Bernhard von Bülow, who was not informed of the late change. Bülow believed that Russia's assistance would be necessary regarding the British presence in India. However, Wilhelm argued that such operations would lead Germany into a futile war in that region, jeopardising Germany's position in Europe. Bülow's disagreement even led him to threaten resignation, prompting a melodramatic letter from the Kaiser that ended with the words, "if a letter of resignation arrived from you, the next morning would find the Kaiser no longer alive! Think of my poor wife and children!" Bülow offered to compromise, but the Russian government rejected the agreement before the issue could be resolved on the German side.

=== Russia ===
Although Tsar Nicholas had signed the treaty, his government did not ratify it due to the preexisting Franco-Russian Alliance. Russian Prime Minister Sergey Witte and Foreign Minister Vladimir Lambsdorff were not present at the signing nor consulted beforehand. They insisted that the treaty should not come into effect unless it was approved and signed by France. Lambsdorff informed the Tsar that it was unacceptable to make the same promise to two governments with opposing interests. The Tsar yielded to their pressure, causing consternation for the Kaiser, who rebuked his cousin: "We joined hands and signed before God, who heard our vows!... What is signed, is signed! and God is our testator!" Wilhelm's chancellor, Count Bernhard von Bülow, also refused to sign the treaty because the Kaiser had added an amendment to the draft. This amendment, which limited the treaty to Europe, was added against the advice of the Foreign Office.

== Sources ==
- Cecil, Lamar. Wilhelm II. UNC Press, 1996. ISBN 0-8078-2283-3.
- Clark, Christopher. Kaiser Wilhelm II: A Life in Power. Penguin, 2009. ISBN 978-0141039930
- Fay, Sidney B. The Kaiser's Secret Negotiations with the Tsar, 1904-1905. American Historical Review 24#1 (1918), pp. 48–72. online
- McLean, Roderick R. "Dreams of a German Europe: Wilhelm II and the Treaty of Björkö of 1905." in The Kaiser: New Research on Wilhelm II’s Role in Imperial Germany (2003): 119-141.
- Reynolds, David. Summits. Six Meetings That Shaped the World. Basic Books, 2007. ISBN 978-0-465-06904-0
- Die Grosse Politik der Europäischen Kabinette 1871-1914, Vol.19, "Chapter 138: Der Vertrag von Björkoe" (pp. 433–528), 1927; primary sources (in German).
