= Mikhail Nikolayevich Muravyov =

Russian statesman (1845–1900)

Mikhail Muravyov L.d'H. GC
- Михаил Муравьёв
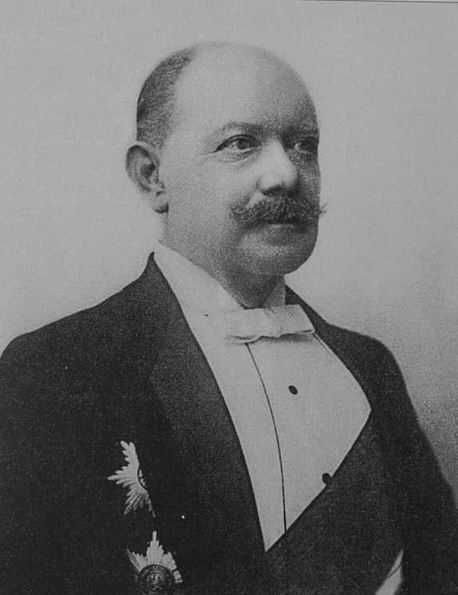
- Muravyov c. 1898

Foreign Minister of Russia
- In office 1897–1900
- Monarch: Nicholas II
- Preceded by: Alexei Lobanov-Rostovsky
- Succeeded by: Vladimir Lamsdorf

Personal details
- Born: April 19, 1845
- Died: June 21, 1900 (aged 55)

Count Mikhail Nikolayevich Muravyov (Russian: Михаи́л Никола́евич Муравьёв, 19 April [O.S. 7 April] 1845, Saint Petersburg – 21 June [O.S. 8 June] 1900) was a Russian statesman who advocated transferring the attention of Russian foreign policy from Europe to the Far East. He is probably best remembered for having initiated the Hague Peace Conference and attempt forging alliance with Germany during the Boer War.

== Life and career ==
Mikhail Muravyov was the son of General Count Nicholas Muravyov (governor of Grodno), and grandson of Count Mikhail Nikolayevich Muravyov-Vilensky, who became notorious for his drastic measures in stamping out the Polish insurrection of 1863 in the Lithuanian provinces. He was educated at a secondary school at Poltava, and was for a short time at Heidelberg University.

In 1864, he entered the chancellery of the minister of foreign affairs at St.Petersburg, and was soon afterwards attached to the Russian legation at Stuttgart, where he attracted the notice of Queen Olga of Württemberg. He was transferred to Berlin, then to Stockholm, and back again to Berlin. In 1877, he was second secretary at The Hague. During the Russo-Turkish War of 1877–1878, he was a delegate of the Red Cross Society in charge of an ambulance train provided by Queen Olga of Württemberg.

After the war, he was successively first secretary in Paris, chancellor of the embassy in Berlin, and then minister in Copenhagen. In Denmark, he was brought much into contact with the imperial family, and, on the death of Prince Lobanov-Rostovsky in 1896, he was appointed by Tsar Nicholas II to be his minister of foreign affairs.

The next three and a half years were a critical time for European diplomacy. The revolt of Crete against Ottoman rule and events leading to the Boxer Rebellion in China were disturbing factors. Count Muravyov's policy regarding Crete was vacillating; in China, his hands were forced by Germany's action at Kiaochow. He misled Britain concerning the Russian leases of Port Arthur and Talienwan from China; he told the British ambassador that these would be open ports, and afterwards significantly modified this pledge.

In 1900, he traveled to Potsdam to advocate for Wilhelm II and Prince von Bülow's inclusion in the Entente. However, the Kaiser declined the proposal, citing his esteemed position as a British admiral and his familial ties to Queen Victoria.

When Tsar Nicholas II inaugurated the Peace Conference at The Hague in 1899, Count Muravyov extricated his country from a situation of some embarrassment in China; but when, subsequently, Russian agents in Manchuria and Peking connived at the agitation which culminated in the Boxer Rebellion of 1900, relations between Muravyov and the tsar became strained. Muravyov died suddenly on June 21, 1900, after a stormy interview with Sergei Witte and Aleksey Kuropatkin in which Witte laid considerable blame on Muravyov for the crisis in China (Muravyov had insisted on taking Port Arthur against Witte's advice); because there was a wound on his left temple when he died, there was a rumor that he had committed suicide, but "the official government announcement asserted that, after rising late, he had merely slipped in his study and grazed his temple on the sharp side of a bureau."

He was awarded Order of the White Eagle and a number of other decorations.

== Notes ==
Political offices
Preceded by Aleksey Lobanov-Rostovsky	Foreign Minister of Russia; 1897–1900	Succeeded by Vladimir Lamsdorf
