= Alexander Izvolsky =

Russian diplomat (1856–1919)

- Александр Извольский
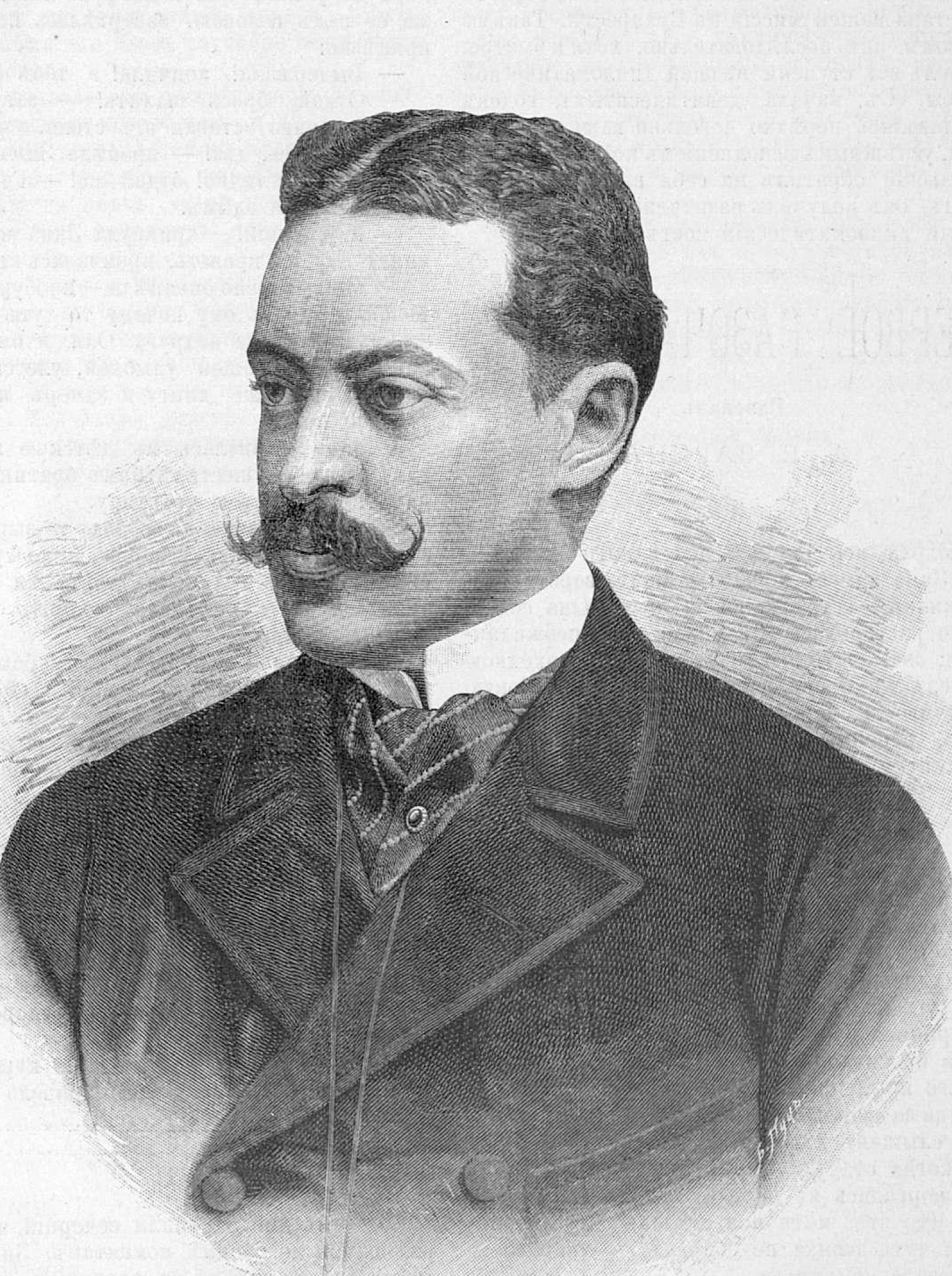
- Izvolsky in 1894

Foreign Minister of the Russian Empire
- In office 11 May 1906 – 11 October 1910
- Preceded by: Vladimir Lambsdorff
- Succeeded by: Sergey Sazonov

Ambassador of the Russian Empire to France
- In office 1910 – 3 March 1917
- Preceded by: Aleksandr Nelidov
- Succeeded by: Vasily Maklakov

Ambassador of the Russian Empire to Denmark
- In office 24 October 1902 – 20 April 1906
- Preceded by: Alexander von Benckendorff
- Succeeded by: Ivan Kudashev

Ambassador of the Russian Empire to Japan
- In office 18 November 1899 – 12 October 1902
- Preceded by: Roman Rozen
- Succeeded by: Roman Rozen

Personal details
- Born: 18 March [O.S. 6 March] 1856 Moscow, Moscow Governorate, Russian Empire
- Died: 16 August 1919 (aged 63) Biarritz, France
- Education: Tsarskoye Selo Lyceum
- Occupation: Diplomat, Foreign Minister
- Awards: see awards

Count Alexander Petrovich Izvolsky or Iswolsky (Russian: Алекса́ндр Петро́вич Изво́льский, 18 March [O.S. 6 March] 1856 in Moscow – 16 August 1919 in Paris) was a Russian diplomat remembered as a major architect of Russia's alliance with Great Britain during the years leading to the outbreak of the First World War in 1914. As Foreign Minister, he assented to Austria-Hungary's annexation of Bosnia and Herzegovina in 1908 in exchange for Austrian support for the opening of the Turkish Straits to Russian warships. In the resultant Bosnian Crisis of 1908–1909 the Powers did not accept the opening of the Straits. Izvolsky, publicly humiliated and destroyed by the debacle, resigned as Foreign Minister in 1910.

== Early life and career ==
Izvolsky came from an aristocratic family of Russian descent. He graduated from the Tsarskoye Selo Lyceum with honours, and shortly thereafter married Countess von Toll, whose family had far-reaching connections at court. Through these connections, he joined the Foreign Ministry, where Prince Lobanov-Rostovsky became his patron.

Izvolsky served as Russia's ambassador to the Vatican, followed by posts in Belgrade, Munich, and Tokyo (from 1899). In Tokyo, Izvolsky urged a peaceful accommodation with the rising power of Imperial Japan over Korea and Manchuria. He assisted Japanese former Prime Minister Itō Hirobumi arrange a trip to St. Petersburg in 1902 in an effort to defuse increasing tensions. The efforts incurred the wrath of Tsar Nicholas II, and Izvolsky found himself transferred to Copenhagen from 1903. From that posting, he continued to press for a diplomatic settlement with Japan before and during the Russo-Japanese War of 1904–1905.

He served as Russia's Foreign Minister between April 1906 and November 1910.

== Anglo-Russian alliance ==
In the wake of the disastrous Russian-Japanese War and the Russian Revolution of 1905, Izvolsky was determined to give Russia a decade of peace. He believed that it was Russia's interest to disengage from the conundrum of European politics and to concentrate on internal reforms. A constitutional monarchist, he undertook the reform and modernization of the Foreign Ministry.

In the realm of more practical politics, Izvolsky advocated a gradual rapprochement with Russia's traditional foes - Great Britain and Japan. He had to face vigorous opposition from several directions, notably from the public opinion and the hard-liners in the military, who demanded a revanchist war against Japan and a military advance into Afghanistan. His allies in the government included Pyotr Stolypin and Vladimir Kokovtsov. He concluded the Russo-Japanese Agreement of 1907 to improve relations with Japan.

Having been approached by King Edward VII during the Russo-Japanese War with a proposal of alliance, he made it a primary aim of his policy when he became Foreign Minister, feeling that Russia, weakened by the war with Japan, needed another ally besides France, which resulted in the Anglo-Russian Convention of 1907.

== Bosnian crisis ==
Another primary objective was to realize Russia's long-standing goal of opening (i.e., permitting free transit, without prior conditions; and in exclusive right to Russia) the Bosporus and the Dardanelles (known jointly as the "Straits") to Russian warships, giving Russia free passage to the Mediterranean and making it possible to use the Black Sea Fleet not just in the coastal defense of her Black Sea territory; but also in support of her global interests.

In one of the secret articles of the renewed League of the Three Emperors of 1881, Austria-Hungary had asserted the right 'to annex Bosnia and Herzegovina at whatever moment she shall deem opportune', and the claim was repeated intermittently in Austro-Russian agreements. This was not contested by Russia, but St Petersburg maintained the right to impose conditions. Izvolsky, with the support of Tsar Nicholas II proposed that the annexation of Bosnia-Herzegovina be exchanged for Austro-Hungarian support for improved Russian access to the Turkish Straits. Izvolsky met with the Austro-Hungarian Foreign Minister, Baron (later Count) Alois Lexa von Aehrenthal, at the Moravian Buchlov Castle on 16 September 1908, and there agreed to support Austria's annexation of Bosnia and Herzegovina in exchange for Austria-Hungary's assent to the opening of the Straits to Russia; and to support such an opening, at any subsequent diplomatic conference.

Aehrenthal's announcement of the annexation on 5 October 1908, secured through alterations of the terms of the Treaty of Berlin at the expense of the Ottoman Empire, occasioned a major European crisis. Izvolsky denied having reached any agreement with Aehrenthal. He subsequently denied any foreknowledge of Aehrenthal's intentions and tried unsuccessfully to have a meeting called to deal with the status of Bosnia-Herzegovina. The impasse in diplomacy was resolved only by the St Petersburg note of March 1909 in which the Germans demanded that the Russians at last recognize the annexation and urge Serbia to do likewise. If they did not, German Chancellor Bülow suggested, there was the possibility of an Austrian war on Serbia and the further direct possibility that the Germans would release the documents proving Izvolsky's connivance in the original annexation deal. Izvolsky backed down at once. Reviled by Russian pan-Slavists for "betraying" the Serbs, who felt Bosnia should be theirs, the embittered Izvolsky was eventually dismissed from office.

Historiography has traditionally laid most blame for the annexation crisis at Aehrenthal's door. The historian Christopher Clark however, in his 2012 study of the causes of the First World War The Sleepwalkers, has challenged this view: "the evidence suggests that the crisis took the course it did because Izvolsky lied in the most extravagant fashion in order to save his job and reputation. The Russian foreign minister had made two serious errors of judgement [firstly] that London would support his demand for the opening of the Turkish Straits to Russian warships - [and] he grossly underestimated the impact of the annexation on Russian nationalist opinion - [when] - he got wind of the press response in St Petersburg, he realized his error, panicked, and began to construct himself as Aehrenthal's dupe." The years following the annexation crisis, with an atmosphere of increased 'chauvinist popular emotion' and with a sense of humiliation in a sphere of vital interest, saw the Russians launch a substantial programme of military investment.

== Later life ==
Upon becoming ambassador in Paris in 1910, Izvolsky devoted his energies to strengthening Russia's anti-German alliance with both the French Third Republic and the United Kingdom and encouraging Russian rearmament. When World War I broke out, he is reputed to have remarked, C'est ma guerre! ("This is my war!").

After the February Revolution, Izvolsky resigned but remained in Paris, where he was succeeded by Vasily Maklakov. He advocated for Allied intervention in the Russian Civil War and wrote a book of memoirs before his last illness.

Shortly before his death, Isvolsky sat up and, greatly to their shock, he told his two children, "If I die, I do not wish to be buried in the Russian Orthodox Church. Let your mother's Protestant pastor read the funeral prayers."

His daughter, though shocked, later attributed her father's words to, "the long-repressed bitterness he had felt, at seeing the abject subservience of the Orthodox Hierarchy to the Tsar, and the corrupting influence of Rasputin."

Alexander Isvolsky died at Biarritz on November 16, 1919. In keeping with his wishes, a funeral service was read over his body by a Protestant minister. His children, however, also arranged for a Panikhida to be offered for Isvolsky at the local Russian Orthodox Cathedral. A Tridentine Requiem Mass was also offered for Isvolsky by a Roman Catholic priest and friend of the family.

== Family ==
His brother — Piotr Petrovich Izvolski (1863—1928) — was Oberprocurator of the Most Holy Synod until he resigned, allegedly in protest over the growing influence of Grigory Rasputin over appointments to the Church Hierarchy. After emigrating to France, he was ordained to the Orthodox priesthood and became an archpriest.

Alexander Izvolsky married Countess Marguerite von Toll, a Baltic German noblewoman of great charm whose influence at court was impeded by her ignorance of the Russian language. Their son fought in the Dardanelles. Their daughter Hélène Iswolsky was received into the Russian Greek Catholic Church and became a prominent scholar and leader of the ecumenical movement, first as a White émigré in Paris and later as a member of the Catholic Worker Movement and close friend of Dorothy Day in the United States.

== Awards ==
- Order of St. Stanislaus 1st degree, 1901
- Order of St. Anne 1st degree 1904
- Order of St Vladimir, 1st degree, 1908
- Order of the White Eagle, 1910
- Order of St. Alexander Nevsky, 1914
- Order of the Paulownia Flowers Grand Cordon, 26 August 1907
- Royal Victorian Order Honorary Grand Cross, 6 September 1907

== Screen Portrayal ==
Izvolsky was depicted in the 1974 BBC mini-series Fall of Eagles. He was played by actor Peter Vaughan.

== Notes ==
Political offices
| Preceded by Vladimir Lambsdorff | Foreign Minister of Russia; 1906–1910 | Succeeded by Sergei Sazonov |
Diplomatic posts
| Preceded by Roman Rosen | Ambassador of the Russian Empire to Japan; 1899–1902 | Succeeded by Roman Rosen |
