= Stepan Sankovsky =

Serbian commander

Stepan Sankovski
- Born: Stepan Andreevich Sankovski; Feodosia, Russian Empire
- Died: 9 March 1818; Feodosia, Russian Empire
- Other names: Stevan, Stjepan
- Military career
- Allegiance: Russian Empire
- Rank: brigadier
- Known for: Diplomat, mayor of Feodosia

Stepan Andreevich Sankovski (Russian: Степан Андреевич Санковский, Serbian: Степан Андрејевич Санковски) was a Russian brigadier and diplomat, serving as an envoy in the Prince-Bishopric of Montenegro in the 1800s, as state advisor on Balkan affairs in the 1810s, as ambassador in Paris in 1810–1816, and mayor of Feodosia, his birth town, since December 1816 until his death. He was a recipient of the Order of Saint Vladimir and Order of Saint Anna.

== Early life ==
Stepan (or Stevan, Стеван Санковски) Sankovski was born in Feodosia on Crimea. Sankovski was a brigadier in the Russian army. He was sent as a commissioner of Emperor Alexander I to the court of Montenegrin metropolitan Petar I.

== Envoy in Montenegro ==
Sankovski arrived in Montenegro in March 1805, with the task of countering French aspirations. He brought 3,000 ducats for the Montenegrin people. He came to almost govern Montenegrin politics.

Užice and Nova Varoš were raided on 5 June 1805 by Serbian rebels, which the Republic of Ragusa connected with Karađorđe's intention to open the road to Montenegro. A couple of weeks later the Pasha of Travnik threatened the Metropolitan of Herzegovina regarding relations with rebels. Sankovski deterred Montenegro and Herzegovina from rising up.

As part of the Austrian-French peace treaty of 14 December 1805, Austria gave France the Bay of Kotor (known as Boka) and Dalmatia, to officially hand over the territories to the French army by 29 January 1806. The Bokelji (Boka people) decided to thwart this, and asked for Russian aid through Sankovski and Montenegro. Sankovski asked Dmitry Senyavin for help and he immediately sent part of his fleet to Boka. Sankovski had asked the local government not to surrender to the French and called Russian ships from the Ionian Sea. On 16 February the Montenegrin assembly decided to unite with Boka and with the help of Russia rid the area of foreign armies. The Bokelji, Montenegrins and Russian captain Beli arrive at Novi the same day, where the Austrians first declined to hand over the fort, but eventually did, on 22 February. Due to these events, the Republic of Ragusa decided to be put under Russian protection, but in the last moment, instead welcomed the French army, as they feared Bokelji-Montenegrin banditry. Russian, Primorje, Montenegrin troops on one side, and French and Ragusan on the other, fought many skirmishes following this.

In late 1806, Russia entered war with the Ottoman Empire and Montenegro aided Russia in skirmishes and rebellions in the bordering territories. Nikšić was besieged in April 1807 by Herzegovinian rebels supported by Montenegrin and Russian troops. At first agreeing to surrender, the Ottomans declined as the Montenegrin troops left the area without informing the Herzegovinians and Russians. Many were killed in an Ottoman attack, and the Russians then went to Klobuk. Here, again, the Montenegrin troops left the siege and the Russian and Herzegovinian troops were destroyed. 400 Russians were captured, later freed after payment from a French commander. The Montenegrin acts were seen as betrayal and the annual 1,000 ducat aid to Montenegro was stopped (until 1816).

The French-Russian Peace of Tilsit was signed in July 1807.

== Ambassador to France ==
In 1810 Sankovsky became the ambassador in Paris.

== Mayor ==
On 26 December 1816 he became the mayor of Feodosia. He died on 9 March 1818.

== Sources ==
- Hrabak, Bogumil (1995). "Српски устаници и Новопазарски санџак (Рашка)". Историјски часопис. 40–41. Istorijski institut.
- Luburić, Andrija (1940). Porijeklo i prošlost Dinastije Petrovića. Vol. 1. Štamp. "Mlada Srbija".
