= Li–Lobanov Treaty =

1896 secret treaty between Russian Empire and Qing China

- Signed: 3 June 1896; 129 years ago
- Location: Moscow, Russian Empire
- Signatories: Aleksey Lobanov-Rostovsky; Li Hongzhang
- Parties: Russian Empire; Qing dynasty
- Languages: Russian; Chinese

The Li–Lobanov Treaty or the Sino-Russian Secret Treaty (Chinese: 中俄密約; Russian: Союзный договор между Российской империей и Китаем) was a secret and unequal treaty signed on June 3, 1896 in Moscow by foreign minister Alexey Lobanov-Rostovsky on behalf of the Russian Empire and viceroy Li Hongzhang on behalf of Qing China. The treaty and its consequences increased anti-foreign sentiment in China, which came to a head in the Boxer Uprising of 1900.

The contents of the agreement were made public only in 1922.

== Background ==
Following the Treaty of Shimonoseki ending the First Sino-Japanese War and the Triple Intervention, China was forced to pay a large indemnity to the Empire of Japan (230 million kuping taels equal to 8,600 tonnes of silver). In order to raise the funds for this payment, China approached France and Russia for loans. Taking advantage of this situation, Russian finance minister Sergei Witte established the Russo-Chinese Bank, which was controlled by the Russian government, and agreed to facilitate the loans.

== Contents ==
Meeting with Li Hongzhang in Moscow during the coronation ceremonies for Tsar Nicholas II, Witte promised to maintain Chinese territorial integrity and suggested a secret military alliance against possible future aggression by the Empire of Japan. In exchange, Russia would be allowed to use Chinese ports for its warships, and to build a Russian gauge railway through Heilongjiang and Jilin to Vladivostok on the Pacific coast. Along with the railway concession, Russian personnel and police received extraterritorial jurisdiction over large portions of Northeast China and the permission to station troops to protect the railway. China was also not allowed to interfere with Russian troop movements or munitions and also had to grant Russia decreased tariff rates. To avoid diplomatic issues with the other major powers, Li insisted that the concession be granted to the Russo-Chinese Bank, rather than directly to the Russian government, making the railway nominally a joint project, although it was in reality completely financed and controlled by Russia.

== Consequences ==
The terms of the treaty were tantamount to the annexation of northeast China by Russia in all but name. Rather than protecting China from Japanese territorial ambitions, the treaty opened the door towards further Russian expansionism in the form of the Russia–Qing Convention of 1898, in which China was forced to lease the southern tip of the Liaodong Peninsula to Russia and allow a southern extension of Russia's China Eastern Railway to be built from northern Harbin to the port city of Dalian. These events increased anti-foreign sentiment in China, which came to a head in the Boxer Uprising of 1900.

== See also ==
- Relations between the Empire of Japan and the Russian Empire (1855–1922)
- Unequal treaties
- Imperialism in Asia
