= Vladimir Lamsdorf =

Russian politician (1845–1907)

Graf Vladimir Lamsdorff
- Владимир Ламсдорф
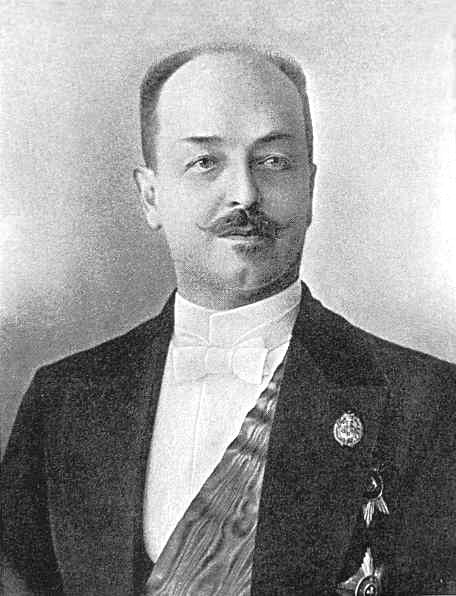
- Count Vladimir N. Lamsdorf

Foreign Minister of Russia
- In office 6 January 1901 – 11 May 1906
- Monarch: Nicholas II
- Preceded by: Mikhail Muravyov
- Succeeded by: Alexander Izvolsky

Personal details
- Born: January 6, 1845 St. Petersburg, Russia
- Died: March 19, 1907 (aged 62) San Remo, Italy
- Resting place: Smolensky Lutheran Cemetery
- Education: Tsarskoye Selo Lyceum; Page Corps
- Awards: see awards

Count Vladimir Nikolayevich Lamsdorf (Russian: Влади́мир Никола́евич Ла́мсдорф; German: Wladimir Nikolajewitsch Freiherr von der Wenge Graf Lambsdorff; 6 January 1845 [O.S. 25 December 1844] – 19 March [O.S. 6 March] 1907) was a Russian statesman of Baltic German descent who served as the foreign minister of the Russian Empire from 1900 to 1906, a crucial period which included the Russo-Japanese War and the Russian Revolution of 1905.

== Early career ==
Lamsdorf was the son of a career officer in the Imperial Russian Army and attended the Page Corps as a youth. As with many other Russian diplomats, he attended the Tsarskoye Selo Lyceum and began his career as a government bureaucrat in 1866. At the Berlin Congress he was in the retinue of Prince Alexander Gorchakov, the Chancellor of the Russian Empire. In 1884 the young diplomat was present at the meeting of Alexander III of Russia, Wilhelm I of Prussia and Franz Josef of Austria in Skierniewice and Kroměříž.

Gorchakov's successor, Nicholas de Giers, singled out Lamsdorf as his protégé and prospective successor. During the 1880s, he was a vocal supporter of the Three Emperors' League but shifted his views after Bismarck's resignation in 1890. In 1897 he was appointed Deputy Foreign Minister. He played a major role at the First Hague Peace Conference of 1899. There was a fair degree of continuity in policies when he succeeded Mikhail Muraviev three years later in 1900.

== Foreign minister ==
Lamsdorf's main concerns revolved around the Eastern Question and the proposed administrative reform of the Ottoman Empire towards strengthening and protecting Russia's position in the Balkans. In late 1902 he personally visited Belgrade, Sofia and Vienna to discuss the Balkan impasse with Nikola Pašić, Hristo Tatarchev, Agenor Maria Gołuchowski, and their monarchs. In September 1903 he accompanied Tsar Nicholas II to Vienna and Mürzzuschlag. Lamsdorf was anxious to prevent the collapse of the Ottoman Empire in the face of Slavic nationalism and emphatically condemned the Ilinden-Preobrazhenie Uprising and other activities of the Internal Macedonian Revolutionary Organization. He was also sympathetic to the Zionist cause, as promoted by Theodor Herzl.

Lamsdorf did not share the Tsar's position that Russia was destined to rule East Asia, and cooperated with Finance Minister Sergei Witte and War Minister Aleksey Kuropatkin to curtail the influence of the Bezobrazov Circle over the Tsar. He proposed to relinquish Russia's commercial and industrial enterprises in Korea to obtain an agreement with Japan, in order to safeguard her interests in the Chinese Eastern Railway and avoid complications with Great Britain. However, he was steadily sidelined by the jingoist hard-liners from the military, especially after the appointment of Admiral Yevgeni Ivanovich Alekseyev as Viceroy of the Far East and events continued their downward spiral towards war, with Lamsdorf seemingly resigned to its inevitability.

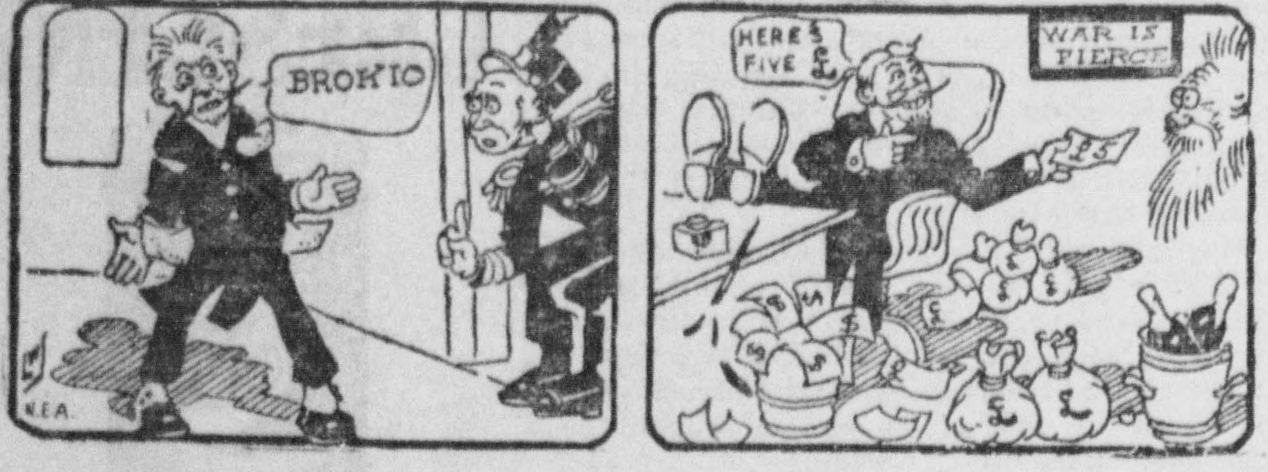
As a result of the Russo-Japanese War, the Korean minister (ambassador) to Russia was left without orders or funding. Other diplomats lent him some money, and Vladimir Lamsdorf instructed that the Korean minister be funded for the duration of the conflict; in gratitude, the Korean minister "hastened to subscribe five pounds to the Russian fleet fund". Lee W. Stanley portrays this scenario in two panels: on the left, the minister shows his empty pockets and declares himself "brokio" (that is, 'broke', or without money); on the right, he sits among several bags of money with his feet on the desk and offers a five-pound note to a bearded man representing Russia. Note the pen and inkwell on the desk, indicating that he has just written a cheque, and the champagne bucket on the floor indicating that he is now wealthy.

The main event of Lamsdorf's tenure in office was the Russo-Japanese War. During the war, Lamsdorf was to a large degree overshadowed by the stronger personality of his close associate, Count Sergei Witte. Together they negotiated the Treaty of Portsmouth, only to learn, upon their return to St. Petersburg, that the Tsar had secretly signed the Treaty of Björkö with Imperial Germany. It was owing to their efforts that the projected Russian-German alliance against Britain never came into effect. This earned Lamsdorf the enmity of both German government and press. If the Tsar had not listened to the arguments of Witte and Lamsdorf, "the whole history of Europe and of the world could have been different".

Lamsdorf was instrumental in Russia's support of France in the Moroccan Crisis of 1906 against Germany, which was a step towards the creation of the Triple Entente.

When eventually relieved of his duties in 1906, Lamsdorf prided himself on having maintained a position equidistant from both Berlin and London. He compared Russia's standing in Europe to "that of a rich bride which none wanted to see fall into the arms of another". Lamsdorf's decidedly cool attitude to both British and German empires was demonstrated by his handling of the Dogger Bank incident and the Treaty of Björkö.

== Personality ==
Lamsdorf was described by his contemporaries as a "leisurely, well-bred man of good society... with a very high forehead and a soft affable manner". He never married and fathered no children. Rumors about his sexual orientation were often exploited by his enemies to undermine his authority at court. A characteristic excerpt from Suvorin's diary: "The Tsar calls Lamsdorf madame and promotes his lover Savitsky within the ranks of the count. Lamsdorf boasts that he spent thirty years in the corridors of the Foreign Ministry. As he is a homosexual and all men are for him sluts, he thus spent thirty years in a bordello". At his resignation, Lamsdorf was admitted into the State Council of Imperial Russia but chose to spend the few remaining months of his life on the Italian Riviera, where he died (in San Remo) at the age of 62.

== Honours and decorations ==
- Order of St Vladimir, 2nd class
- Order of St. Stanislaus 1st degree
- Order of St. Anne 1st degree
- , Order of St. Alexander Nevsky
- Order of the White Eagle

Foreign decorations

- Kingdom of Prussia: Order of Merit of the Prussian Crown - September 1901 - on the occasion of the visit to Germany of Tsar Nikolai II for Fleet maneuvers.
- Kingdom of Hungary: Grand Cross of the Order of Saint Stephen - December 1902 - during a visit to Vienna.

== Sources ==
- Kowner, Rotem (2006). Historical Dictionary of the Russo-Japanese War. The Scarecrow Press. ISBN 0-8108-4927-5.

Political offices
Preceded by Mikhail Muraviev	Foreign Minister of Russia; 1900–1906	Succeeded by Alexander Izvolsky
