= Aleksey Lobanov-Rostovsky =

Russian statesman (1824–1896)

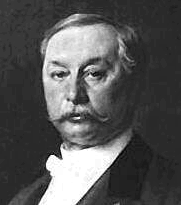
Aleksey Lobanov-Rostovsky

Prince Aleksey Borisovich Lobanov-Rostovsky (Russian: Алексе́й Бори́сович Лоба́нов-Росто́вский; 30 December [O.S. 18 December] 1824 in Voronezh Governorate – 30 August [O.S. 18 August] 1896) was a Russian statesman, probably best remembered for having concluded the Li-Lobanov Treaty with China, the Peace of Constantinople with the Ottoman Empire, and for his publication of the Russian Genealogical Book (in two volumes).

== Life ==
Prince Lobanov-Rostovsky was educated at Tsarskoye Selo Lyceum. At the age of twenty, he entered the diplomatic service and became minister at Constantinople in 1859. In 1863, a regrettable incident in his private life made him retire temporarily from the public service, but four years later he re-entered it and served for ten years as an assistant to the minister of the interior.

At the close of the Russo-Turkish war in 1878, he was selected by Alexander II as ambassador to Constantinople, and for more than a year he carried out with great ability the policy of his government, which aimed at re-establishing tranquility in the Eastern Question after the disturbances produced by the reckless action of his predecessor, Count Ignatiev. In 1879 he was transferred to London, and in 1882 to Vienna. In March 1895, under Nicholas II, he was appointed minister of foreign affairs in succession to Nicholas de Giers.

In this position he displayed much of the caution of his predecessor, but adopted a more energetic policy in European affairs generally and especially in the Balkan Peninsula. At the time of his appointment the attitude of the Russian government towards the Slav nationalities had been for several years one of extreme reserve, and he had seemed as ambassador to sympathize with this attitude. But as soon as he became minister of foreign affairs, Russian influence in the Balkan Peninsula suddenly revived. Serbia received financial assistance; a large consignment of arms was sent openly from Saint Petersburg to the prince of Montenegro; Prince Ferdinand of Bulgaria became ostensibly reconciled with the Russian emperor, and his son Boris was received into the Eastern Orthodox Church; the Russian embassy at Constantinople tried to bring about a reconciliation between the Bulgarian exarch and the Ecumenical Patriarch; Bulgarians and Serbians professed, at the bidding of Russia, to lay aside their mutual hostility.

All this seemed to foreshadow the creation of a Balkan confederation hostile to the Ottoman Empire, and Sultan Abdul Hamid II had reason to feel alarmed. In reality Prince Lobanov was merely trying to establish a strong Russian hegemony among these nationalities, and he had not the slightest intention of provoking a new crisis in the Eastern Question so long as the general European situation did not afford Russia a convenient opportunity for solving it in her own interest without serious intervention from other powers. Meanwhile, he considered that the integrity and independence of the Ottoman Empire must be maintained so far as these other powers were concerned. At the same time efforts were made to weaken the Triple Alliance, the principal instrument employed being the entente with France, which Prince Lobanov helped convert into a formal alliance between the two great powers.

In East Asia he was not less active and became the protector of China in the same sense as he had shown himself the protector of Turkey. By the Yamagata-Lobanov Agreement, Japan was compelled to give up her conquests in Northeast China, so as not to interfere with the future actions of St. Petersburg in Manchuria and financial and political schemes for increasing czarist influence in that part of the world were vigorously supported. All this activity, though combined with a haughty tone towards foreign governments and diplomats, did not produce much general apprehension, probably because there was a widespread conviction that he desired to maintain peace, and that his great ability and strength of character would enable him to control the dangerous forces which he boldly set in motion. However this may be, before he had time to mature his schemes, and when he had been the director of Russian policy for only eighteen months, he died suddenly of heart disease when travelling with the emperor on August 30, 1896.

Prince Lobanov-Rostovskiy was an aristocrat of the Russian type, proud of being descended from the independent princes of Rostov. He was versed in Russian history and genealogy, and an authority on the reign of Tsar Paul I (1754–1801). His extensive collection of coins, particularly those minted by the Russians during their occupation of Königsberg in 1758–1761, was acquired by the Russian Museum.

== Sources ==
- "Лобанов-Ростовский, Алексей Борисович" . Brockhaus and Efron Encyclopedic Dictionary (in Russian). 1906.

Political offices
Preceded by Nicholas de Giers	Foreign Minister of Russia; 1895–1896	Succeeded by Mikhail Muraviev
