= Tsarskoye Selo Lyceum =

Lyceum in Saint Petersburg, Russia, 1811–1918

Coordinates: 59°43′3″N 30°23′49″E

- Императорский Царскосельский лицей
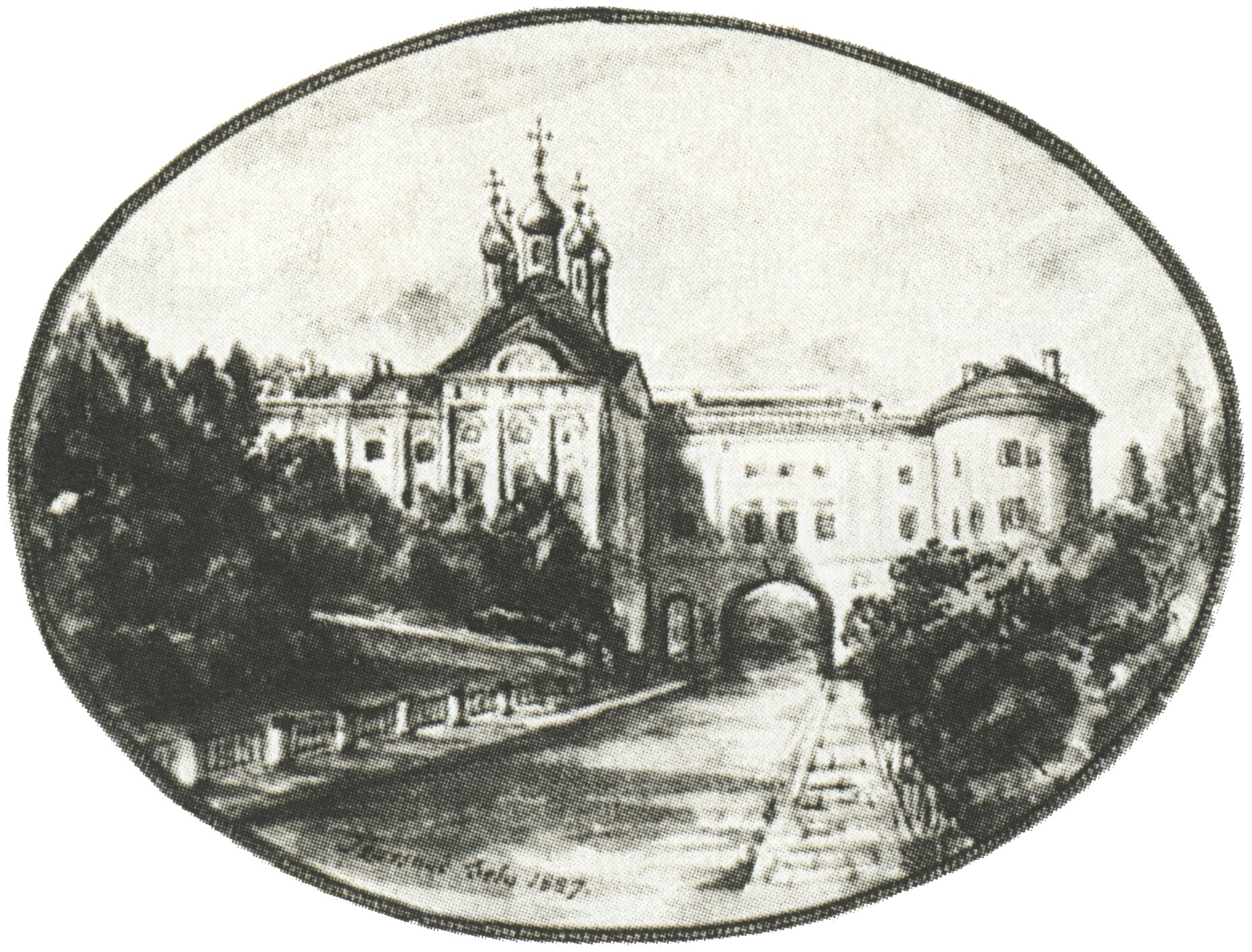
- Tsarskoye Selo; Russian Empire

Information
- Motto: MOTTO
- Established: 31 October 1811
- Closed: 29 May 1918

The Imperial Lyceum (Russian: Императорский Царскосельский лицей, romanized: Imperatorskiy Tsarskosel'skiy litsey) in Tsarskoye Selo "Imperial Village" near Saint Petersburg, also known historically as the Imperial Alexander Lyceum after its founder Tsar Alexander I, was an educational institution which was founded in 1811 with the object of educating youths of the best families who would afterwards occupy important posts in the Imperial service.

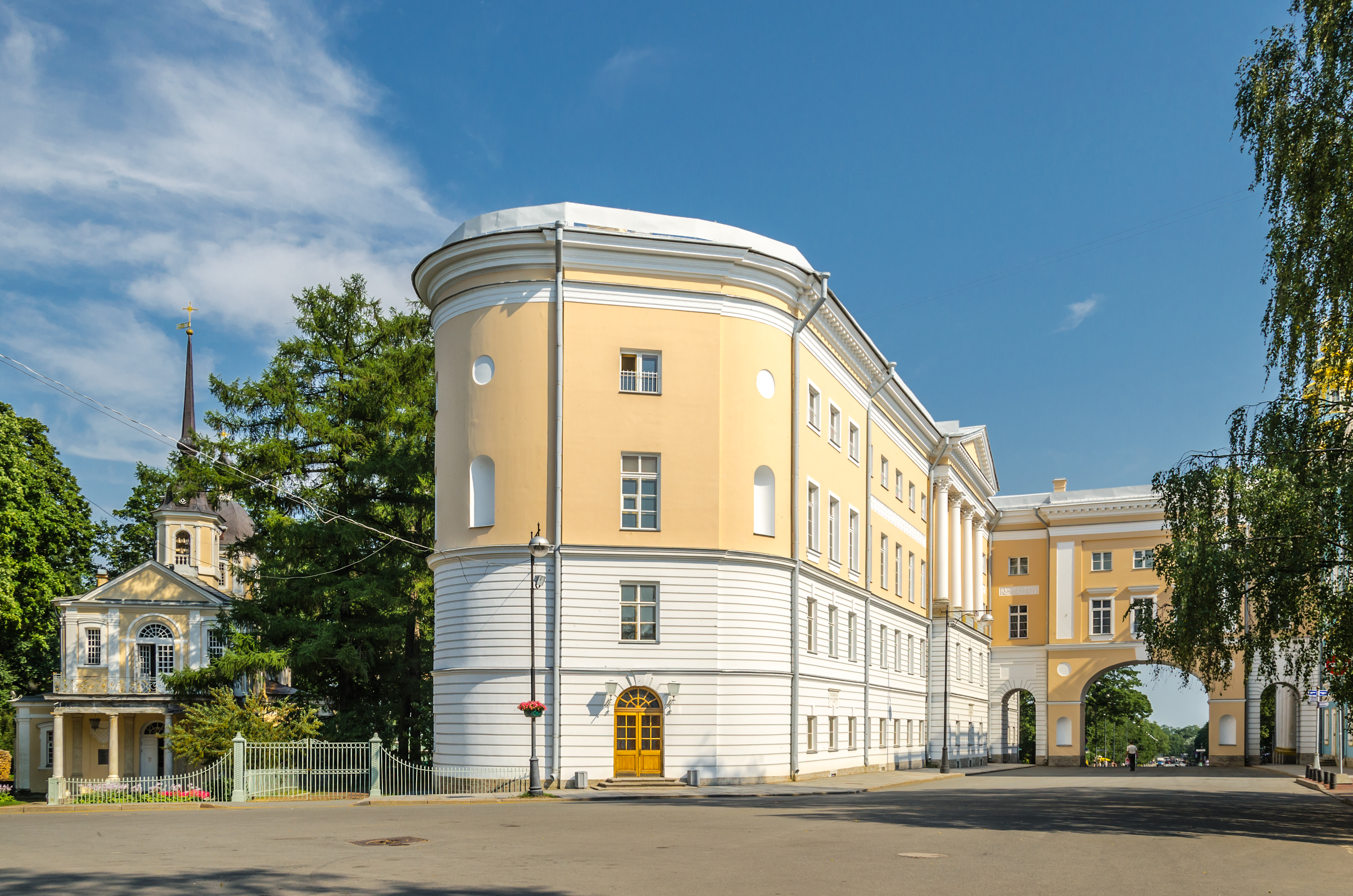
The yard of the Imperial Lyceum.

Its regulations were published on 11 January 1811, but they had received the Imperial sanction on 12 August 1810, when the four-story "new" wing of the Great Palace was appointed for its accommodation. The Tsarskoye Selo Lyceum was opened on 19 October 1811. The first graduates included Alexander Pushkin and Alexander Gorchakov. In January 1844, the Lyceum was moved to St Petersburg.

In May 1918, the Lyceum was closed following order by the Council of People's Commissars.

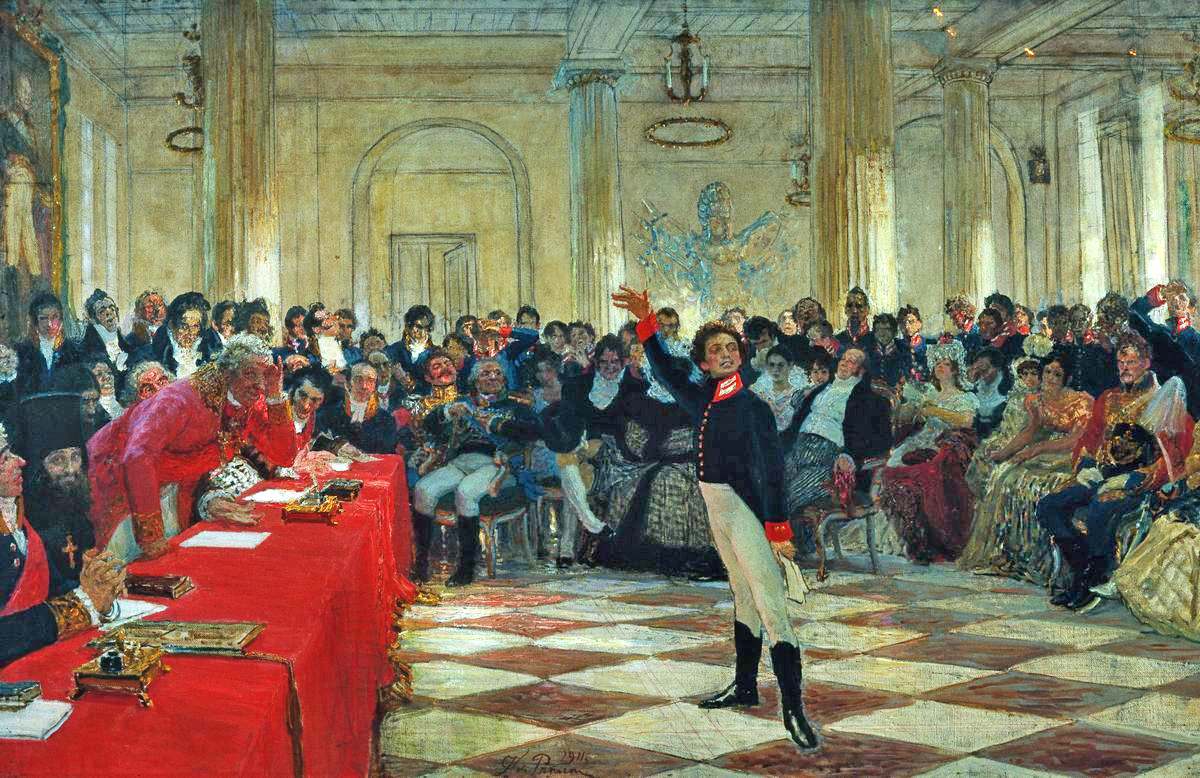
14-year-old Pushkin reciting his poem before old Derzhavin in the Lyceum (painting by Ilya Repin from 1911, the school's centennial).

During the 33 years of the Tsarskoye Selo Lyceum's existence at its original location, there were 286 graduates. Over the span of the schools entire existence, the most famous of these, in addition to the above two, were Anton Delvig, Wilhelm Kuchelbecker, Nicholas de Giers, Dmitry Tolstoy, Yakov Grot, Nikolay Danilevsky, Aleksey Lobanov-Rostovsky, Fyodor Shcherbatskoy and Mikhail Saltykov-Shchedrin.

== See also ==
- List of Tsarskoye Selo Lyceum people
