= Nicholas II =

Emperor of Russia from 1894 to 1917

- Nicholas in 1912

Emperor of Russia
- Reign: 1 November 1894 – 15 March 1917 (Note: O.S. 20 October 1894 – 2 March 1917)
- Coronation: 26 May 1896 (Note: O.S. 14 May 1896)
- Predecessor: Alexander III
- Successor: Monarchy abolished (Georgy Lvov as Minister-Chairman of the Provisional Government)
- Prime Ministers: See list
- Born: 18 May [O.S. 6 May] 1868; Alexander Palace, Tsarskoye Selo, Russia
- Died: 17 July 1918 (aged 50); Ipatiev House, Yekaterinburg, Russia
- Cause of death: Gunshot wounds (murder)
- Burial: 17 July 1998; Peter and Paul Cathedral, Saint Petersburg
- Spouse: Alix of Hesse (m. 1894)
- Issue: Grand Duchess Olga; Grand Duchess Tatiana; Grand Duchess Maria; Grand Duchess Anastasia; Tsesarevich Alexei
Names
- Nikolai Alexandrovich Romanov
- House: Holstein-Gottorp-Romanov
- Father: Alexander III of Russia
- Mother: Dagmar of Denmark
- Religion: Russian Orthodox

Nicholas II (Note: Russian: Никола́й II Алекса́ндрович, romanized: Nikolay II Aleksandrovich) (18 May [O.S. 6 May] 1868 – 17 July 1918) was the last Emperor of Russia from 1 November 1894 until his abdication in 1917, during the Russian Revolution. A member of the Romanov dynasty, he oversaw the Russian Empire's role in the Russo-Japanese War and the First World War. During the Russian Civil War, Nicholas and his family were murdered by the Bolsheviks.

Born in Tsarskoye Selo, Nicholas was the eldest son of Emperor Alexander III and Empress Maria Feodorovna. He was educated privately and trained for military service, but was widely considered ill-prepared for the demands of ruling a vast empire. Despite ostensibly presiding over a constitutional monarchy, Nicholas resisted political reform and retained autocratic control over the nation's governance even after the establishment of the Duma. While his reign witnessed significant industrial growth and diplomatic engagement, it was also marked by domestic unrest, military defeats, and widespread criticism of his leadership.

Nicholas faced mounting disapproval following Russia's defeat in the Russo-Japanese War as well as the turmoil of the 1905 Revolution. During World War I, his popularity declined even further as military losses and economic hardship eroded public confidence in his rule. In March 1917, the February Revolution forced his abdication, ending the Romanov dynasty's 304-year rule. He and his family were imprisoned by the Provisional Government and later transferred to Bolshevik custody. On 17 July 1918, they were executed in Yekaterinburg.

In the years following his death, Nicholas was reviled by Soviet historians and state propaganda as a "callous tyrant" who "persecuted his own people while sending countless soldiers to their deaths in pointless conflicts". Despite being viewed more positively in recent years, the majority view among historians is that Nicholas was a well-intentioned yet poor ruler who proved incapable of handling the challenges facing his nation. He and his family were canonised as passion bearers by the Russian Orthodox Church in 2000, following the discovery and reburial of their remains in 1998.

== Early life ==
=== Birth and family background ===
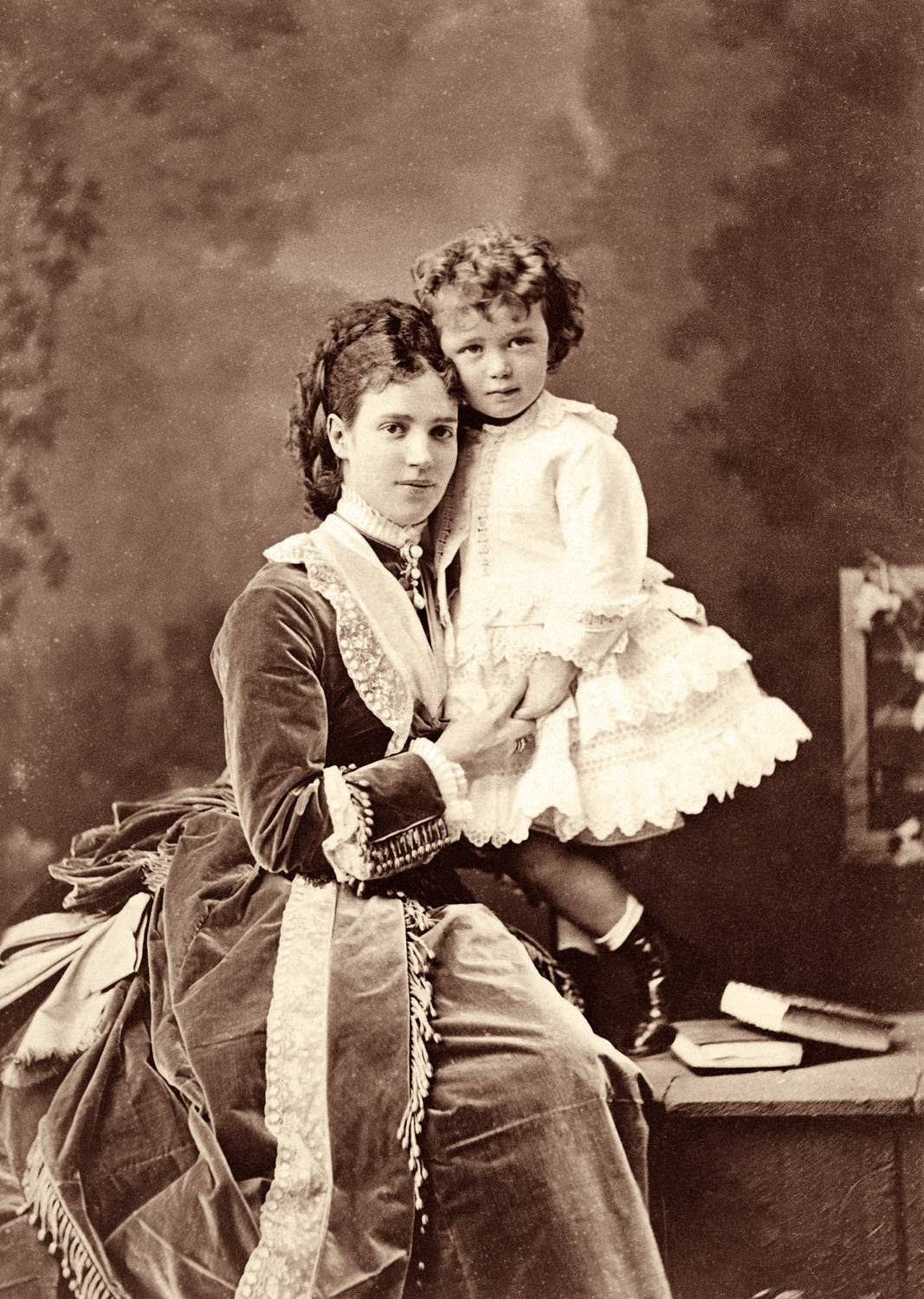
Nicholas with his mother, Maria Feodorovna, in 1870

Nicholas was born on 18 May [O.S. 6 May] 1868 at the Alexander Palace in Tsarskoye Selo, south of Saint Petersburg, during the reign of his paternal grandfather, Emperor Alexander II. He was the eldest child of the then-Tsesarevich Alexander Alexandrovich and his wife, Tsesarevna Maria Feodorovna (née Princess Dagmar of Denmark). Alexandrovich was heir apparent to the Russian throne as the second, but eldest surviving, son of Alexander II and Maria Alexandrovna (née Princess Marie of Hesse and by Rhine). Maria Feodorovna was the daughter of King Christian IX and Queen Louise of Denmark.

Nicholas was christened on 1 June [O.S. 20 May] in the Chapel of the Resurrection of the Catherine Palace at Tsarskoye Selo by the imperial family's confessor, protopresbyter Vasily Borisovich Bazhanov. His godparents were Alexander II (his paternal grandfather), Queen Louise of Denmark (his maternal grandmother), Crown Prince Frederik of Denmark (his maternal uncle), and Grand Duchess Elena Pavlovna (his great-great-aunt). He received the traditional Romanov name Nicholas, in memory of his father's elder brother and his mother's first fiancé, Tsesarevich Nicholas Alexandrovich of Russia, who had died in 1865. Informally, he was known as "Nicky" throughout his life.

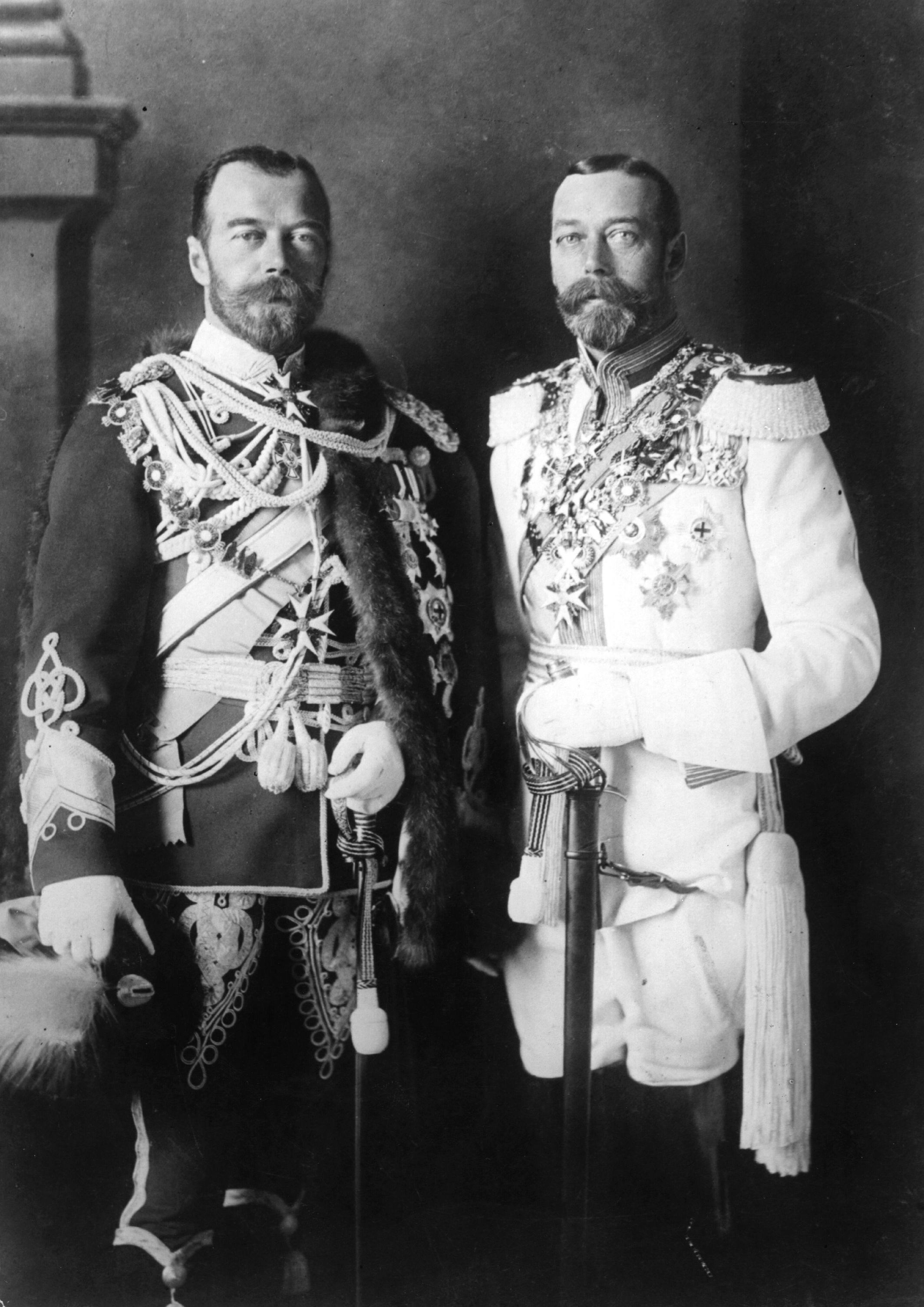
Nicholas with his cousin, George V of the United Kingdom (right), wearing German military uniforms in Berlin before the war; 1913

Nicholas was of primarily German and Danish descent and was related to several European monarchs. His mother's siblings included Kings Frederick VIII of Denmark and George I of Greece, as well as Queen Alexandra of the United Kingdom (consort of King Edward VII). Nicholas, his wife Alexandra, and Wilhelm II, German Emperor, were all first cousins of King George V of the United Kingdom. Nicholas was also a first cousin of King Haakon VII and Queen Maud of Norway, as well as King Christian X of Denmark and King Constantine I of Greece. Nicholas and Wilhelm II were second cousins once removed through descent from King Frederick William III of Prussia, and third cousins as great-great-grandsons of Tsar Paul I of Russia. In addition to being second cousins through descent from Louis II, Grand Duke of Hesse, and his wife Princess Wilhelmine of Baden, Nicholas and Alexandra were also third cousins once removed through descent from King Frederick William II of Prussia.

Nicholas was the first cousin once removed of Grand Duke Nicholas Nikolaevich. To distinguish between them, the Grand Duke was often known within the imperial family as Nikolasha and Nicholas the Tall, while the Tsar was Nicholas the Short.

=== Childhood ===
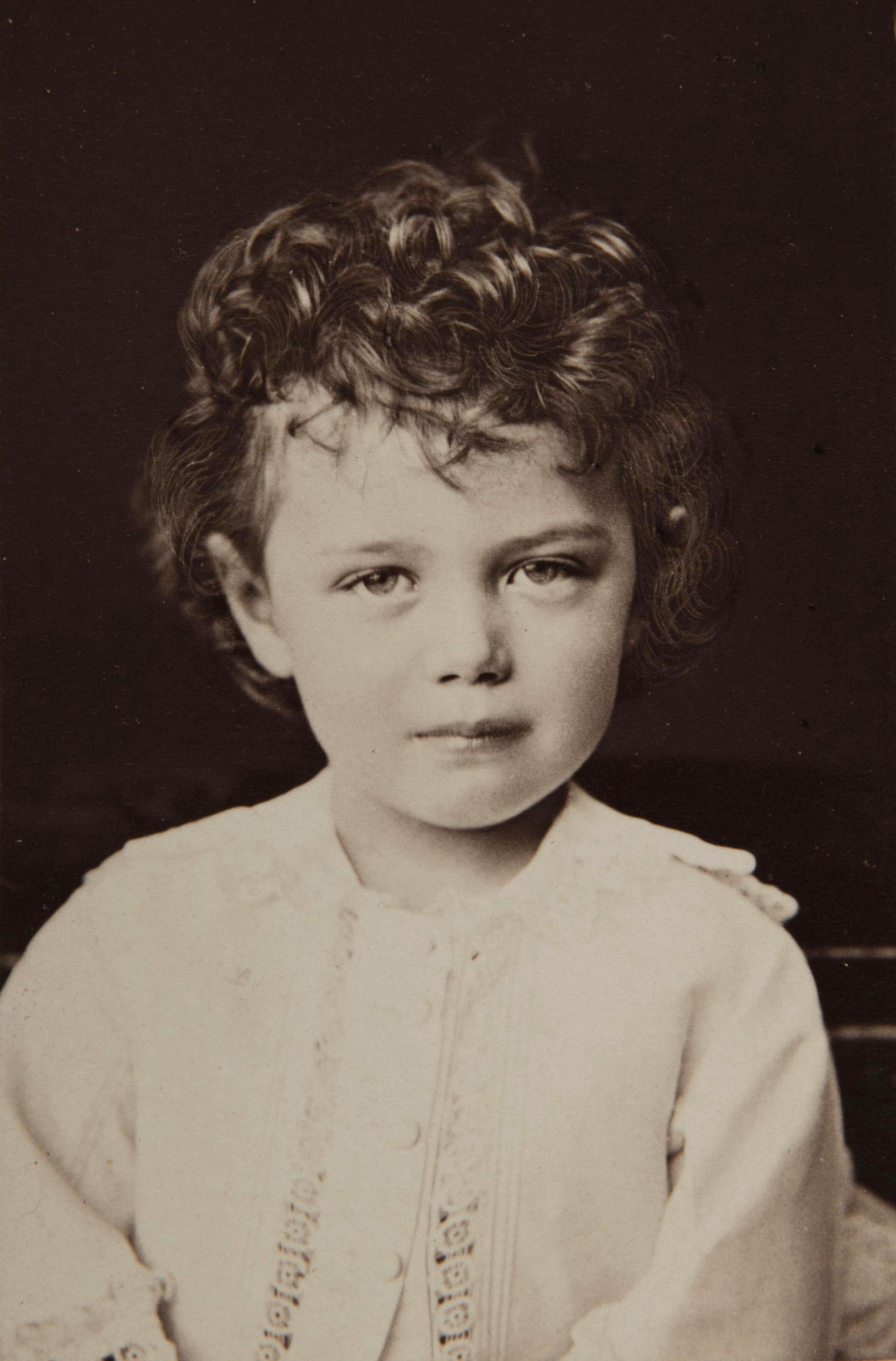
Nicholas at age three, 1871

Nicholas had five younger siblings: Alexander (1869–1870), George (1871–1899), Xenia (1875–1960), Michael (1878–1918), and Olga (1882–1960). Nicholas often referred nostalgically to his father in letters after Alexander's death in 1894, and he remained very close to his mother, as shown in their published correspondence. During his childhood, Nicholas, his parents, and his siblings made annual visits to the Danish royal palaces of Fredensborg and Bernstorff to see his grandparents, the king and queen. These gatherings also served as wider family reunions, with his mother's siblings travelling from the United Kingdom, Germany, and Greece with their families. It was during one such visit in 1883 that he had a brief flirtation with his British first cousin, Princess Victoria. In 1873, Nicholas accompanied his parents and his younger brother George on a two‑month semi‑official visit to the United Kingdom. In London, the family stayed at Marlborough House as guests of his uncle and aunt, Edward and Alexandra, the Prince and Princess of Wales, where Nicholas was indulged by his uncle.

In February 1880, a group of nihilist activists detonated a bomb in the dining room of the Winter Palace, destroying almost the entire room. No one was injured. Following the attack, Alexander III and his family moved to the Yelagin Palace on Yelagin Island.

== Tsesarevich ==
On 1 March 1881, (Note: 1 March 1881 in the Julian calendar then in use in Russia, which is the same day as 13 March 1881 in the Gregorian calendar used elsewhere.) following the assassination of his grandfather, Tsar Alexander II, by the Narodnaya Volya Nicholas became heir apparent, or tsesarevich, upon his father's accession as Alexander III. Nicholas and other family members witnessed Alexander II's death, at the Winter Palace in Saint Petersburg, where he was brought after the attack. For security reasons, the new Tsar and his family relocated their primary residence to the Gatchina Palace, 48 kilometres from the city, only entering the capital for ceremonial functions. On such occasions, Alexander III and his family occupied the nearby Anichkov Palace. The Gatchina Palace had been built for Alexander I's father Paul I. Nicholas kept a diary.

Nicholas, colloquially called Nicky by his family, spent much of his vacations with them in his mother's home country Denmark and on cruises along the coasts of the Grand Duchy of Finland, especially on Alexander III's fishing lodge in Langinkoski, on the river Kymi in Kotka. In summertime the family lived at the Alexander Palace, at the Livadia Palace in Crimea or sometimes hunted deer in Łowicz County, Poland.

Nicholas and his siblings were raised in a Spartan way, in an English fashion. They slept in tent bends, rose at 6 and took cold baths, sometimes they were given a warm bath in their mother's bathroom. Breakfast consisted of porridge and black bread, lunch of lamb chops or roast beef with peas and roasted potatoes, and tea of bread, butter and jam. Nicholas and brother George had their own salon, dining room, play room and bedroom, which were simply decorated. The only prominent item was an icon surrounded by pearls and jewels. Because of the happy marriage of Nicholas's parents, he was raised surrounded by love and safety, which was missing in many other royal families.

Nicholas and George shared the same teachers, but studied in adjacent rooms. They followed the course of the academy of the general staff, and their teachers were valued professors. Their English teacher Charles Heath, who was Nicholas's favourite teacher, had acted as teacher of their uncles, Grand Duke Sergei and Paul. Both brothers spoke and wrote English. Heath inspired them in sport, especially shooting and fly fishing. They spoke fluent French as well as passable German and Danish. Konstantin Pobedonostsev, was Nicholas' teacher of law and history. His home teacher general Danilovich did not ask for much from the tsesarevich, as "the sacrament of coronation will give the ruler all the information he needs."

Neither Nicholas's upbringing, nor his nature, was suitable for the difficult duties that awaited him as emperor. He had received military education from his teachers, and his taste and interests were similar to other young Russian officers. He had little intelligent ambition, but enjoyed physical exercise and the supplies of military life: uniforms, insignia and parades. But he felt uncomfortable in official situations. Even though he had charm, he was shy and avoided close contact with his subjects, preferring the privacy of his family. According to his diary he played childish games well past the age of 20.

Nicholas's brawny father, who could not tolerate weakness, was discouraging to Nicholas. Once when Nicholas made a mistake and let a playmate take the blame, Alexander shouted at him: "You are a girl!" Alexander was aware his son was too childish to take on responsibility, which he said clearly to minister of finance Sergei Witte. Nicholas learnt to obey his father, who told him to participate in committees. Nicholas found political tasks uninteresting and instead partied with other young officers from the Preobrazhensky, and Hussar Guards from the Romanov family, in restaurants and in the company of young women on islands near St Petersburg. He was especially influenced by his uncle, Grand Duke Sergei Alexandrovich Romanov.

Nicholas underwent military training under general Gregory Danilovich and was inspired by him and senior procurator Konstantin Pobedonostsev in a Pan-Slavist and even mystical religious way. Pobedonostsev's teachings caused Nicholas to think that as emperor by the grace of God he had a sacred duty to upkeep the autocracy and the Eastern Orthodox religion.

In 1884, Nicholas' coming-of-age ceremony was held at the Winter Palace, where he pledged loyalty to his father. Later that year, Nicholas' uncle, Grand Duke Sergei Alexandrovich, married Princess Elizabeth, daughter of Louis IV, Grand Duke of Hesse, and his late wife Princess Alice of the United Kingdom, and a granddaughter of Queen Victoria. At the wedding in St Petersburg, the sixteen-year-old Tsarevich met with and admired the bride's youngest surviving sister, twelve-year-old Princess Alix. Those feelings became romantic following her visit to St Petersburg in 1889. Alix had feelings for him in turn. As a devout Lutheran, she was reluctant to convert to Russian Orthodoxy to marry Nicholas, but relented.

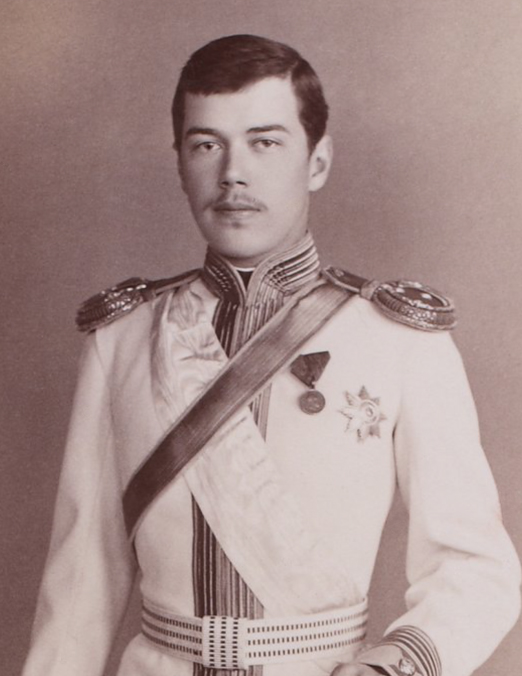
Nicholas Alexandrovich, Tsarevich of Russia, 1880s

In October 1890 Nicholas, his younger brother George, and their cousin Prince George of Greece, set out on a world tour on the cruiser Pamiat Azova, although Grand Duke George fell ill in Bombay and was sent home partway through the trip. Nicholas visited Egypt, India, Singapore, and Siam (Thailand), receiving honors as a distinguished guest in each country. During his trip through Japan, Nicholas had a large dragon tattooed on his right forearm by tattoo artist Hori Chiyo. Nicholas' cousin George V of the UK had received a dragon tattoo from Hori in Yokohama years before. It was during his visit to Otsu, that Tsuda Sanzō, one of his escorting policemen, swung at the Tsarevich's face with a sabre, an event known as the Ōtsu incident. Nicholas was left with a 9 centimeter long scar on the right of his forehead, but it was not life-threatening. The incident cut his trip short.

Returning overland to St Petersburg, he was present at the ceremonies in Vladivostok commemorating the beginning of work on the Trans-Siberian Railway. In 1893, Nicholas traveled to London on behalf of his parents for the wedding of his cousin the Duke of York to Princess Mary of Teck. Queen Victoria was struck by the physical resemblance between the two cousins, and their appearances confused some at the wedding. Nicholas had an affair with St. Petersburg ballerina Mathilde Kschessinska. After returning to St Petersburg, Nicholas continued his relationship with Kschessinska in spite of his father's disapproval. However, Nicholas had already decided to marry Alix, and the marriage was supported by Sergei and Elisabeth. In 1894 Nicholas told Mathilde that he wished for Alix to marry him. The relationship between tsesarevich and ballerina ended, and in 1921 Mathilde married Nicholas's cousin, Grand Duke Andrei Vladimirovich of Russia.

Nicholas attended meetings of the State Council; however, as his father was only in his forties, it was expected it would be years before Nicholas succeeded. Sergei Witte, finance minister, saw things differently and suggested to the Tsar that Nicholas be appointed to the Siberian Railway Committee. Alexander argued that Nicholas was not mature enough to take on serious responsibilities, having once stated "Nikki is a good boy, but he has a poet's soul...God help him!" Witte stated that if Nicholas was not introduced to state affairs, he would never be ready to understand them. Alexander's assumption he would have years to prepare Nicholas proved wrong: by 1894, Alexander's health was failing.

== Engagement, marriage and family ==
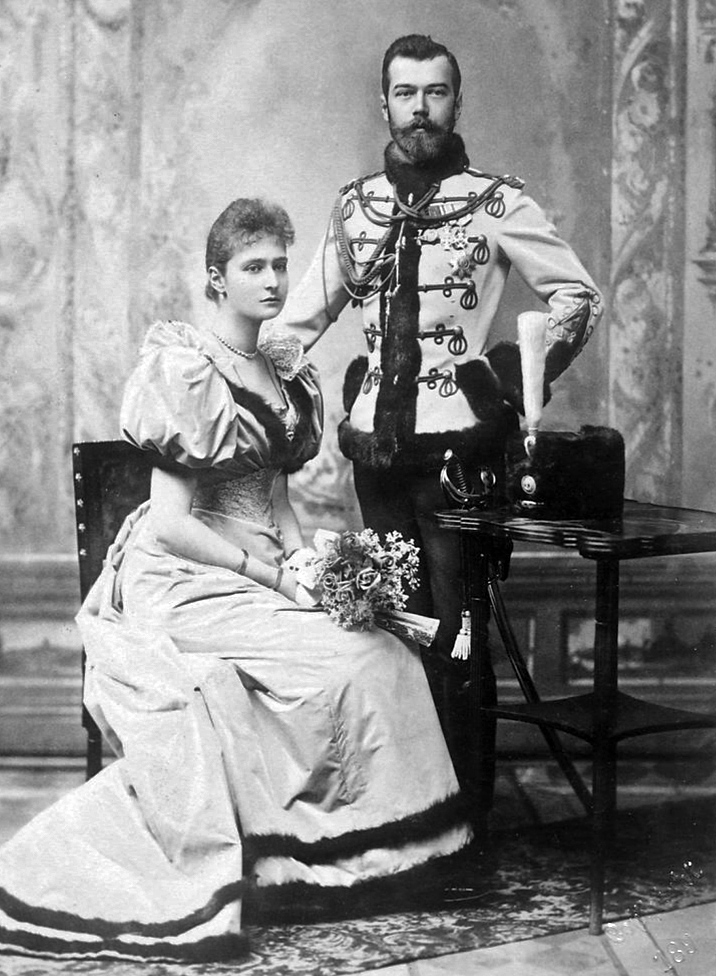
Official engagement photograph of Nicholas II and Alexandra, April 1894

In April 1894, Nicholas travelled to Coburg, Germany, for the wedding of Grand Duke Ernest Louis of Hesse, brother to both Alix and Elizabeth, to Princess Victoria Melita of Saxe-Coburg and Gotha. Guests included Queen Victoria, Kaiser Wilhelm II, the Empress Frederick, the Prince of Wales, and the Duke and Duchess of Saxe-Coburg and Gotha. While in Coburg, Nicholas proposed to Alix, who initially refused due to her reluctance to convert to Orthodoxy. Persuaded by the Kaiser, she reconsidered, and the couple became officially engaged on 20 April. Nicholas's parents hesitated to approve the match, citing Alix's poor impressions in Russia, but consented as Tsar Alexander III's health declined.

That summer, Nicholas visited Alix and Queen Victoria in England, coinciding with the birth of the Duke and Duchess of York's first child, the future Edward VIII. Nicholas and Alix attended the christening and were named among the child's godparents. He later returned to Russia for his sister Xenia's wedding to Grand Duke Alexander Mikhailovich ("Sandro").

By autumn, Alexander III was dying. Upon learning he had only weeks to live, he summoned Alix to Livadia Palace. She arrived on 22 October, and the Tsar, in full uniform, urged Nicholas to heed the advice of Sergei Witte. Alexander died ten days later, aged 49, and Nicholas was consecrated that evening as Tsar Nicholas II. The following day, Alix was received into the Russian Orthodox Church, taking the name Alexandra Feodorovna and the title of Grand Duchess and style of Imperial Highness.

Their wedding took place at the Winter Palace on 26 November 1894, less than a month after Alexander's funeral. Due to the mourning period, the ceremony was modest. Observers reportedly remarked of the new empress: "She came to us from behind the coffin..."

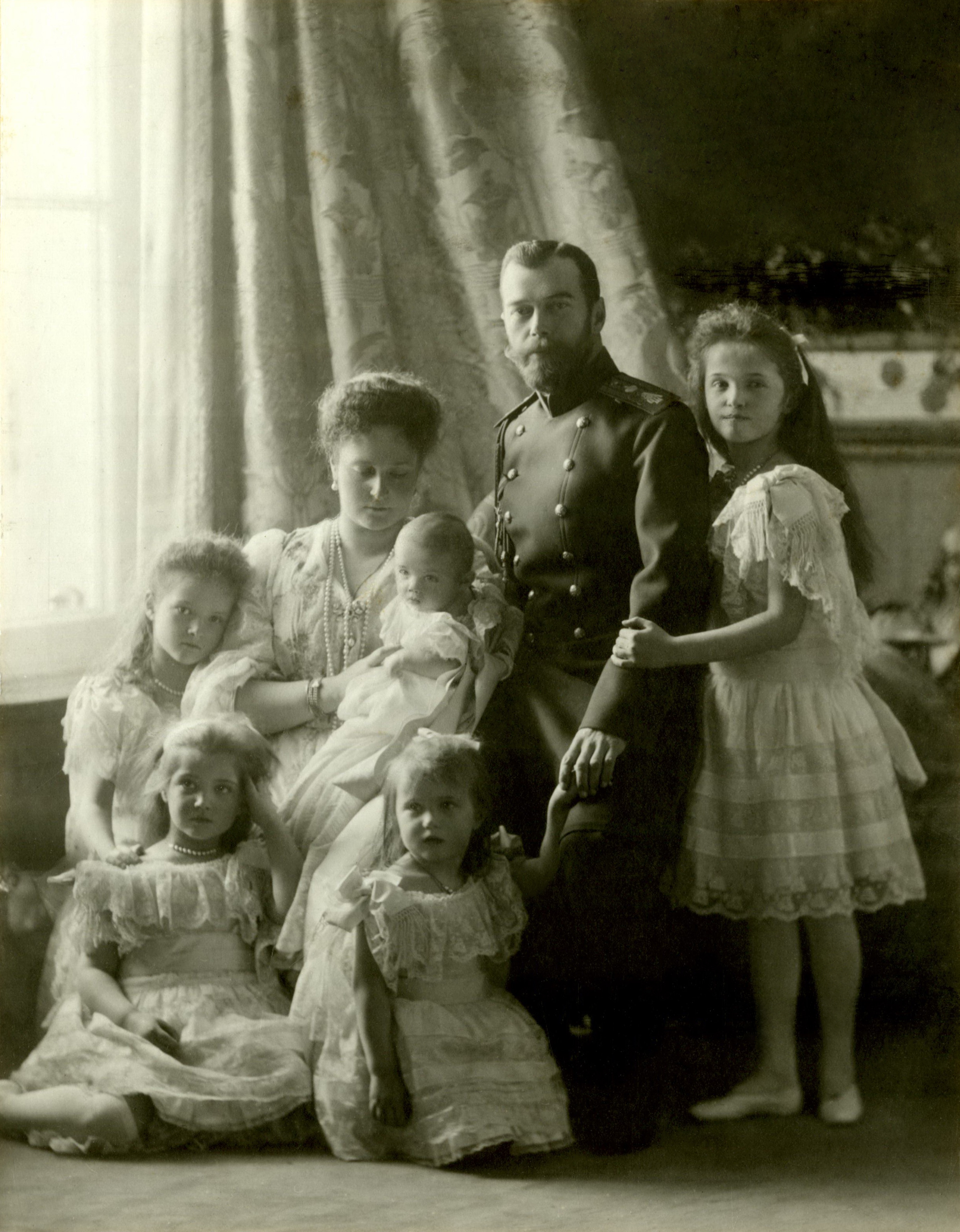
Nicholas II and family in 1904

Nicholas and Alexandra had five children: Olga (b. 15 November 1895), Tatiana (b. 10 June 1897), Maria (b. 26 June 1899), and Anastasia (b. 18 June 1901), and their only son Alexei (b. 12 August 1904), heir to the throne. Alexei suffered from haemophilia B, a hereditary illness passed down from Queen Victoria. Other affected relatives included Prince Leopold, Princess Beatrice's sons Leopold and Maurice, and Beatrice's grandsons Alfonso and Gonzalo of Spain. Alix's brother Friedrich and her sister Irene's sons, Waldemar and Henry of Prussia, also suffered from the disease. Recent research suggests Anastasia was a carrier, though asymptomatic.

The imperial couple concealed Alexei's condition until 1912, seeking any possible cure. In 1911, Grigori Rasputin, a Siberian peasant mystic, entered their inner circle. Alexandra believed deeply in his healing abilities, and his influence, despite public perception of him as lecherous and uncivilised, intensified distrust of the monarchy. Rasputin had a calming effect on Alexei, which reinforced Alexandra's faith in him. Some writers and historians, such as Massie and Ferro, suggest that Rasputin stopped Alexei's bleeding through hypnosis, which some modern physicians say is effective in managing hemophilia. Still other historians–including memoirist Pierre Gilliard, Alexei's French-language tutor–have speculated that Rasputin controlled Alexei's bleeding by disallowing the administration of aspirin, then widely used to relieve pain, but unknown as an anti-clotting agent until the 1950s. Under Alexandra's influence, Nicholas increasingly turned to spiritual advisers, especially Rasputin, who eventually gained sway over the imperial couple.

== Reign ==
=== Coronation ===
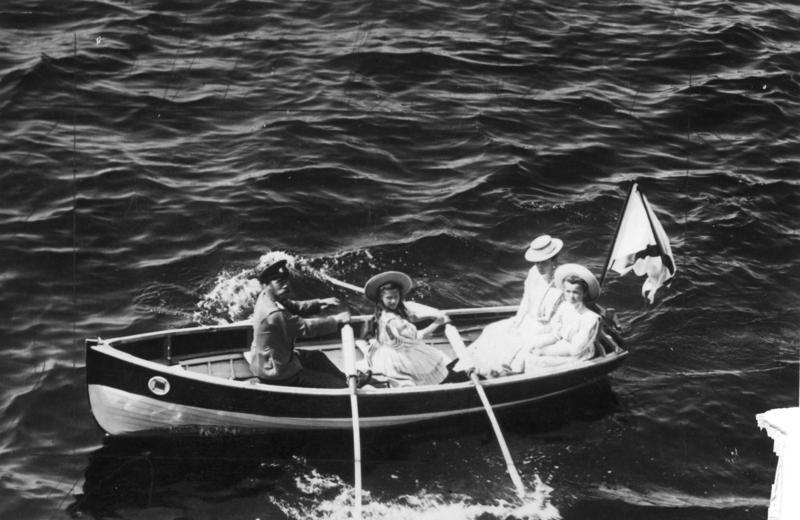
Nicholas (left) and his family on a boat trip in the Finnish archipelago in 1909

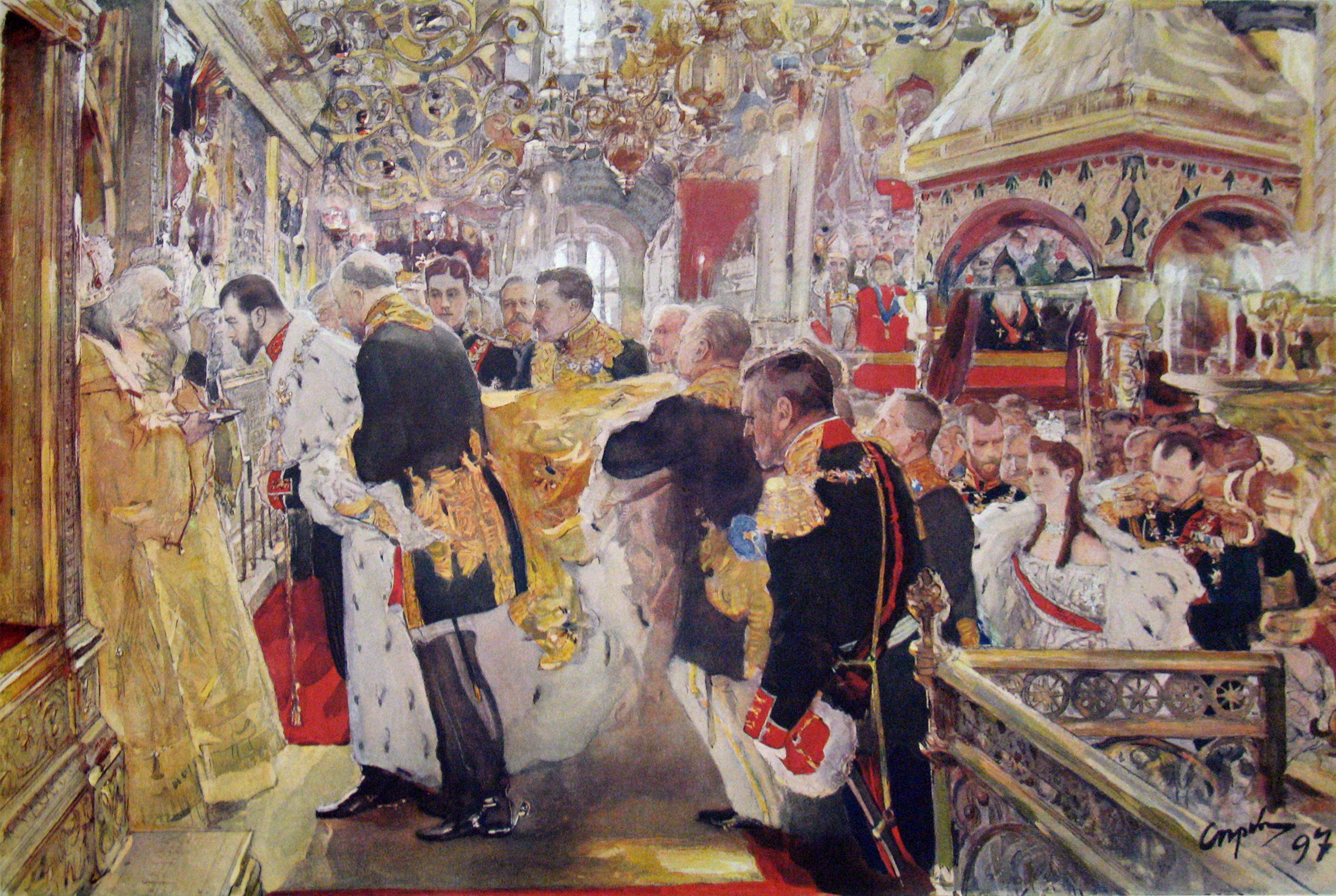
Coronation of Nicholas II by Valentin Serov

Despite a visit to the United Kingdom in 1893, where he observed the House of Commons in debate and was seemingly impressed by the machinery of constitutional monarchy, Nicholas turned his back on any notion of giving away any power to elected representatives in Russia. Shortly after he came to the throne, a deputation of peasants and workers from various towns' local assemblies (zemstvos) came to the Winter Palace proposing court reforms, such as the adoption of a constitutional monarchy, and reform that would improve the political and economic life of the peasantry, in the Tver Address.

Although the addresses they had sent in beforehand were couched in mild and loyal terms, Nicholas was angry and ignored advice from an Imperial Family Council by saying to them:

... it has come to my knowledge that during the last months there have been heard in some assemblies of the zemstvos the voices of those who have indulged in a senseless dream that the zemstvos be called upon to participate in the government of the country. I want everyone to know that I will devote all my strength to maintain, for the good of the whole nation, the principle of absolute autocracy, as firmly and as strongly as did my late lamented father.

On 26 May 1896, Nicholas's formal coronation as Tsar was held in Uspensky Cathedral located within the Kremlin. The event was of gigantic proportions, and people from all over Russia arrived to witness the coronation of the new emperor. At the coronation, lieutenant Carl Gustaf Emil Mannerheim, a future president of Finland, was one of the four officers escorting the new emperor. Brown trout from Finland was served for the guests at the coronation. Nicholas II announced already at the start of his reign that he would use the Russian title of Tsar instead of the western title of Emperor.

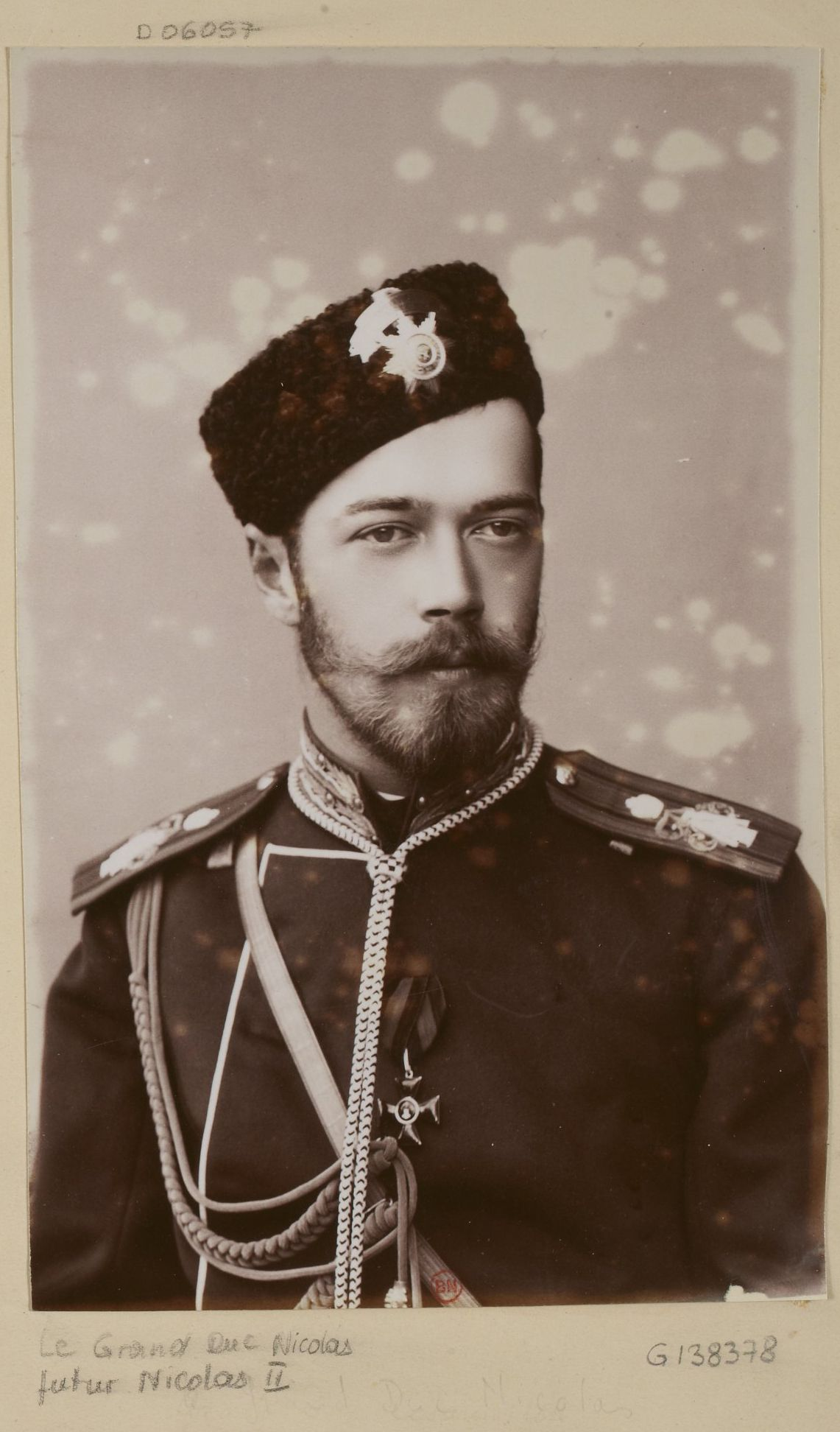
Nicholas as Tsesarevich in 1892

In a celebration on 30 May 1896, a large festival with food, free beer and souvenir cups was held in Khodynka Field outside Moscow. Khodynka was chosen as the location as it was the only place near Moscow large enough to hold all of the Moscow citizens. Khodynka was primarily used as a military training ground and the field was uneven with trenches. Before the food and drink was handed out, rumours spread that there would not be enough for everyone. As a result, the crowd rushed to get their share and individuals were tripped and trampled upon, suffocating in the dirt of the field. Of the approximate 100,000 in attendance, it is estimated that 1,389 individuals died and roughly 1,300 were injured. The Khodynka Tragedy was seen as an ill omen and Nicholas found gaining popular trust difficult from the beginning of his reign. The French ambassador's gala was planned for that night. The Tsar wanted to stay in his chambers and pray for the lives lost, but his uncles believed that his absence at the ball would strain relations with France, particularly the 1894 Franco-Russian Alliance. Thus Nicholas attended the party; as a result the mourning populace saw Nicholas as frivolous and uncaring.

During the autumn after the coronation, Nicholas and Alexandra made a tour of Europe. After making visits to the emperor and empress of Austria-Hungary, the Kaiser of Germany, and Nicholas's Danish grandparents and relatives, Nicholas and Alexandra took possession of their new yacht, the Standart, which had been built in Denmark. From there, they made a journey to Scotland to spend some time with Queen Victoria at Balmoral Castle. While Alexandra enjoyed her reunion with her grandmother, Nicholas complained in a letter to his mother about being forced to go shooting with his uncle, the Prince of Wales, in bad weather, and was suffering from a bad toothache.

=== Start of reign ===
A few hours after the Emperror Alexander III's death, Nicholas II wrote despairingly in diary: 'Lord, help us in these grim days!'. When Nicholas II ascended to the throne he had very little experience of governing and he trusted the experience and diplomatic abilities of his mother, the widowed empress Maria Feodorovna, for the first 10 years. Nicholas's wife was also strong-willed, which is thought to have resulted from the fact that Nicholas sought to compensate his own lack of a strong will by governing autocratically. Nicholas was also wary of his own ministers, but was himself unable to govern properly. According to Simon Sebag Montefiore Nicholas spent the first 10 years of his reign listening to his uncles, especially the Grand Duke and Admiral General Alexei Alexandrovich Romanov, whom Nicholas's second cousin, the Grand Duke and naval officer Alexander Mikhailovich would have wanted to fire. Nicholas and the imperial family often spent their summers on the archipelago and coast of Finland. The imperial family sailed to Finland on the imperial yacht Standart.

Right from the start of his reign, Nicholas showed an interest for humanistic ideals. He attended the first Hague Conference in 1893. Because of his poor knowledge of people, his preference of an isolated family life and his weak authority he soon fell into the hands of his reactionary surroundings. The only idea he steadfastly held on was the principle of an autocratic ruler.

Nicholas was a weak emperor. He did better as a father and husband than a ruler of a gigantic, restless realm. He was of average ability and indecisive character, but also modest and frugal. Like his father Alexander III he was very old-fashioned and sought to Russificate everything that had been previously westernised, including preferring to use the title of tsar instead of emperor as he thought it sounded more Russian. Nicholas allowed his wife to control him in matters of government, such as choices of people. Because of this, renovations often failed because of one single thing: any renovation would have been contrary to the interests of their children. Especially the crown prince Alexei was important in this regard, and his future interests were not to be endangered.

The first years of Nicholas's reign saw little more than continuation and development of the policy pursued by Alexander III. Nicholas allotted money for the All-Russia exhibition of 1896. In 1897 restoration of the gold standard by Sergei Witte, Minister of Finance, completed the series of financial reforms, initiated fifteen years earlier. By 1902 the Trans-Siberian Railway was nearing completion; this helped the Russians trade in the Far East but the railway still required huge amounts of work.

During the first ten years of Nicholas II's reign, Russia saw a societal and economic transform, a change from an agrarian society to an industrial one, whose seeds had already been sown during the reign of Nicholas's father Alexander III. During the inspection period from 1880 to 1910 economic growth in Russia was over nine percent per year on average. The old-fashioned legislature, the unsolved question of land ownership after serfdom had been abolished in 1861 and concentration of economic growth in wealthy metropolitan areas caused conflicts among the growing working class, which the Socialist Revolutionary Party and the communists used as a vessel of growth.

=== Internal politics ===
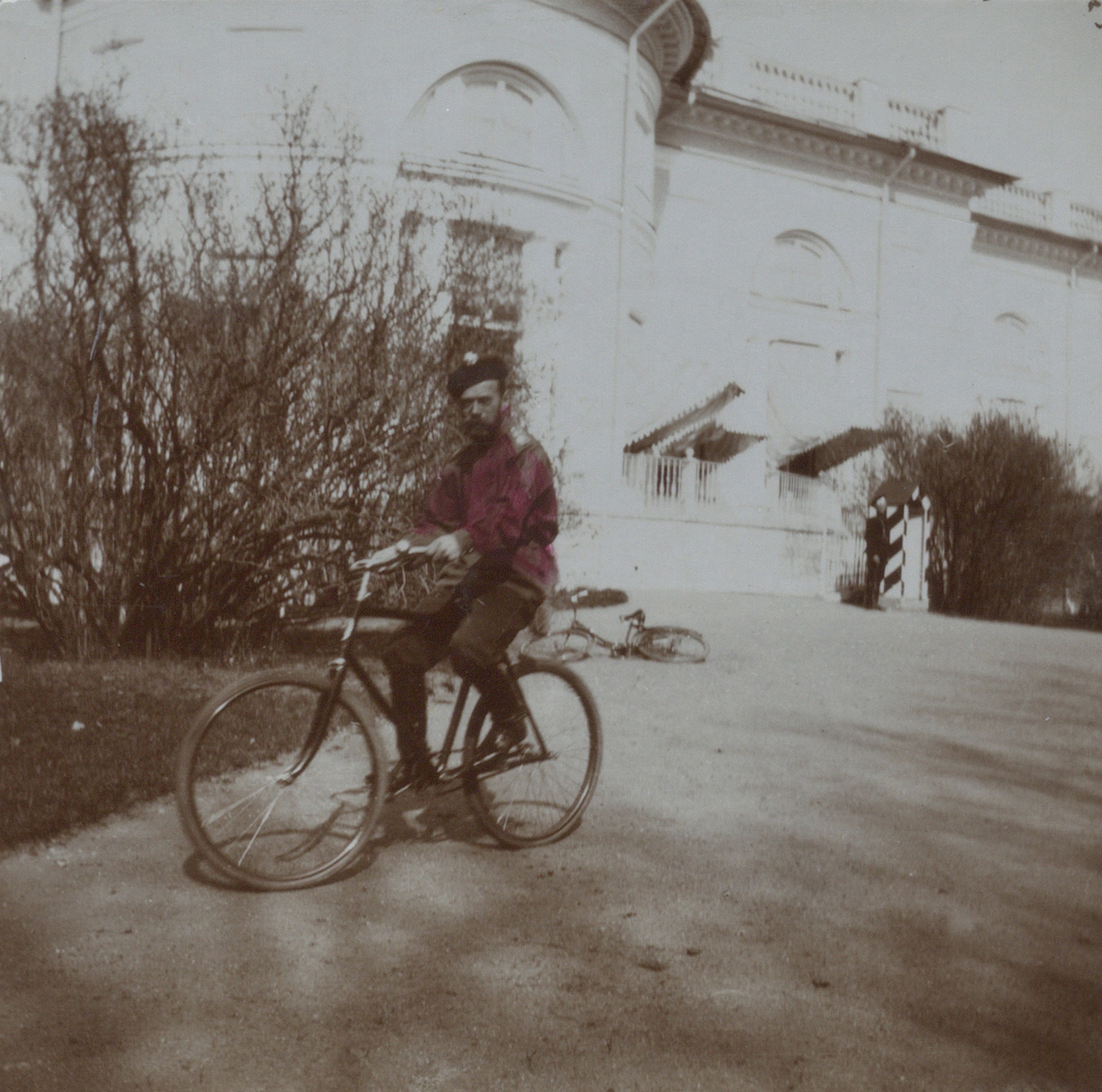
Nicholas II on his bike behind the Alexander Palace, in 1913. It was one of his favorite sports, shared with his children.

In addition to Rasputin, Nicholas also had other irresponsible favourites, often men of questionable authenticity, who gave him a twisted image of Russian life, but which was more desolate for him than that described in official reports. He did not trust his ministers, primarily because he felt they were intelligently superior to him and feared they might try to usurp his sovereign rights. His view of his role as an authority was naively simple: he had received his authority from God, to whom alone he was responsible, and his holy duty was to keep his absolute power intact. He lacked the necessary strength of will for one with such a high view of his duty. In doing his duty Nicholas had to undergo a constant battle against himself, suffocating his natural indecisiveness and assuming the mask of confident decisiveness. His devotion to the autocratic dogma was an insufficient replacement for constructive politics, which alone would have lengthened his imperial reign.

Empress Alexandra was at one point guided by Grigori Rasputin, which caused the emperor's close circle to fill with sycophants supporting his autocracy. His circle was different from the world outside the Alexander Palace, and he had no idea of the real plight of Russia. In his politics, Nicholas sought to continue the line of his father Alexander III, but with significantly less success.

Near the start of World War I Russia was drawing nearer and nearer to a revolution as the workers demanded more rights from the upper class. Nicholas had been raised to believe in his own position as a ruler chosen by God, and so he felt a parliament demanded by the people was a betrayal of God's trust.

In internal politics Nicholas mostly fell on the conservatism of his father Alexander III. In Finland he was known for his acts of Russification (the February Manifesto), which led to the first period of oppression in Finland. As a result of the 1905 revolution, Nicholas had to submit to renovations. In the October Manifesto written by Nicholas's competent prime minister Sergei Witte, a parliament, also known as the Duma, was founded in Russia, and citizens' rights were widened (freedom of speech, freedom of religion, freedom of assembly). Nicholas still retained the right to veto the laws made by the Duma and the right to dissolve the parliament, which he also used twice, in 1906 and in 1907. The other renovations were also gradually cancelled, and Nicholas's government slipped back into regression. Witte's successors as prime minister, whose election was influenced by the empress Alexandra and the family's friend Grigori Rasputin, were either incompetent (Ivan Goremykin) or inflexible (Pyotr Stolypin).

Nicholas II visited Helsinki on 10 March 1915.

Russian economy during Nicholas II

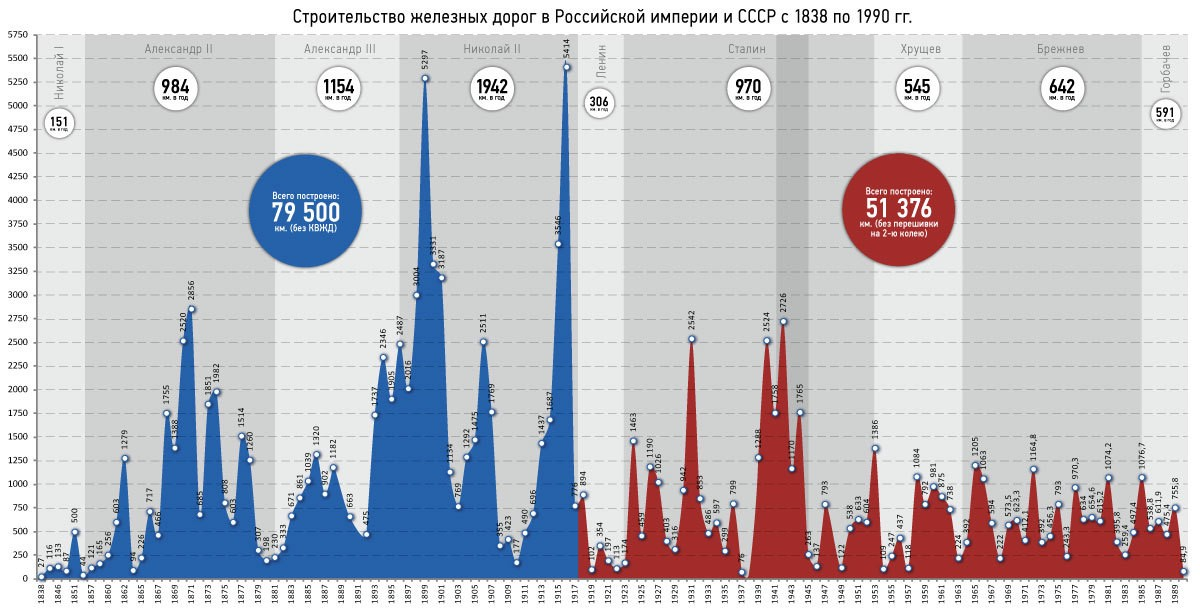
History of rail transport in Russia: Kilometres of rail roads built each year in Russian territory, from 1837 to 1989. Nicholas II's reign witnessed the most intense period of rail building.

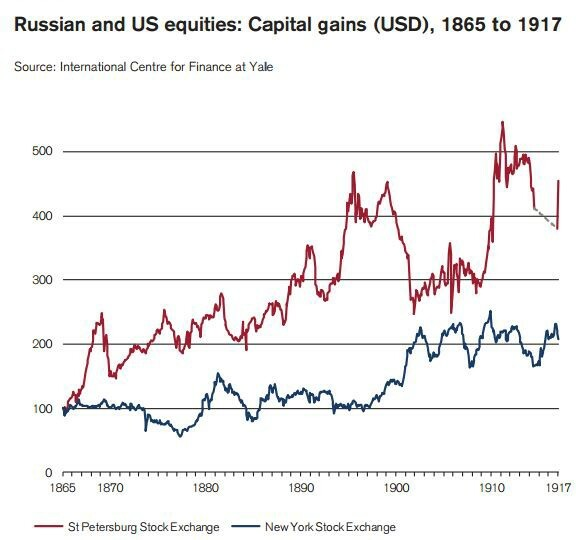
Stock market in Russia: Indexes of Russian and US equities (1865 - 1917). Nicholas II's reign saw the highest indexes reached by Russian equities.

=== Ecclesiastical affairs ===
Imperial monogram

Nicholas always believed God chose him to be the tsar and therefore the decisions of the tsar reflected the will of God and could not be disputed. He was convinced that the simple people of Russia understood this and loved him, as demonstrated by the display of affection he perceived when he made public appearances. His strong religious beliefs in his case made for a very stubborn ruler who rejected constitutional limitations on his power. It put the tsar at variance with the emerging political consensus among the Russian elite. It was further belied by the subordinate position of the Church in the bureaucracy. The result was a new distrust between the tsar and the church hierarchy and between those hierarchs and the people. Thereby the tsar's base of support was conflicted.

In 1903, Nicholas threw himself into an ecclesiastical crisis regarding the canonisation of Seraphim of Sarov. The previous year, it had been suggested that if he were canonised, the imperial couple would beget a son and heir to throne. While Alexandra demanded in July 1902 that Seraphim be canonised in less than a week, Nicholas demanded that he be canonised within a year. Despite a public outcry, the Church bowed to the intense imperial pressure, declaring Seraphim worthy of canonisation in January 1903. That summer, the imperial family travelled to Sarov for the canonisation.

=== Initiatives in foreign affairs ===
According to his biographer:

His tolerance if not preference for charlatans and adventurers extended to grave matters of external policy, and his vacillating conduct and erratic decisions aroused misgivings and occasional alarm among his more conventional advisers. The foreign ministry itself was not a bastion of diplomatic expertise. Patronage and "connections" were the keys to appointment and promotion.

Emperor Franz Joseph I of Austria paid a state visit in April 1897 that was a success. It produced a "gentlemen's agreement" to keep the status quo in the Balkans, and a somewhat similar commitment became applicable to Constantinople and the Straits. The result was years of peace that allowed for rapid economic growth.

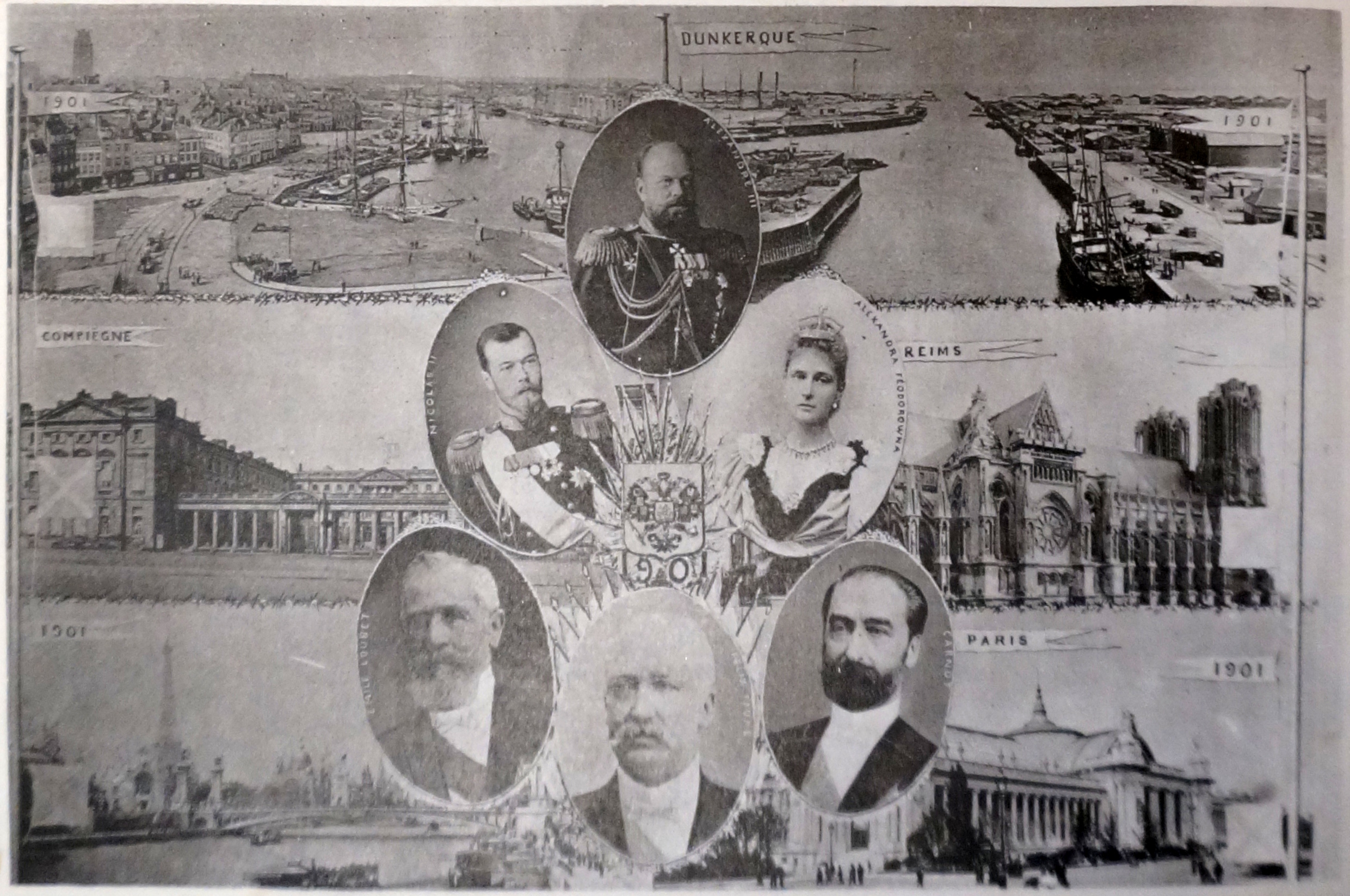
Souvenir postcard of the French maneuvers of 1901 attended by Nicholas II and Alexandra

Nicholas followed the policies of his father, strengthening the Franco-Russian Alliance and pursuing a policy of general European pacification, which culminated in the famous Hague peace conference. This conference, suggested and promoted by Nicholas II, was convened with the view of terminating the arms race, and setting up machinery for the peaceful settlement of international disputes. The results of the conference were less than expected due to the mutual distrust existing between great powers. Nevertheless, the Hague conventions were among the first formal statements of the laws of war. Nicholas II became the hero of the dedicated disciples of peace. In 1901 he and the Russian diplomat Friedrich Martens were nominated for the Nobel Peace Prize for the initiative to convene the Hague Peace Conference and contributing to its implementation. However historian Dan L. Morrill states that "most scholars" agree that the invitation was "conceived in fear, brought forth in deceit, and swaddled in humanitarian ideals...Not from humanitarianism, not from love for mankind."

Nicholas aimed to strengthen the Franco-Russian Alliance and proposed the unsuccessful Hague Convention of 1899 to promote disarmament and peacefully solve international disputes.

=== Russo-Japanese War ===
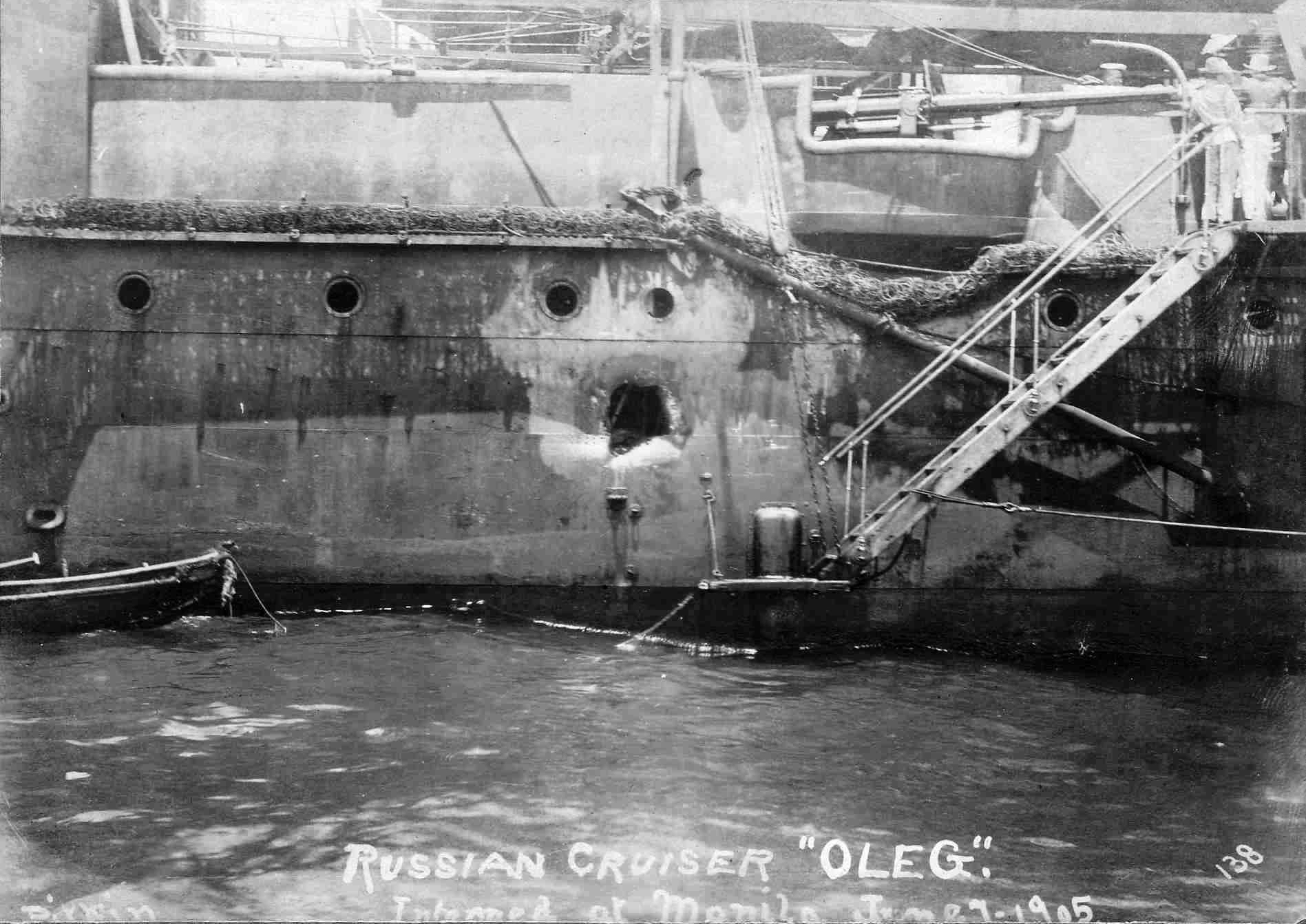
The Russian Baltic Fleet was annihilated by the Japanese at the Battle of Tsushima.

A clash between Russia and the Empire of Japan was almost inevitable by the turn of the 20th century. Russia had expanded in the Far East, and the growth of its settlement and territorial ambitions, as its southward path to the Balkans was frustrated, conflicted with Japan's own territorial ambitions on the Asian mainland. Nicholas pursued an aggressive foreign policy with regards to Manchuria and Korea, and strongly supported the scheme for timber concessions in these areas as developed by the Bezobrazov group.

Before the war in 1901, Nicholas told his brother-in-law Prince Henry of Prussia "I do not want to seize Korea but under no circumstances can I allow Japan to become firmly established there. That will be a casus belli."

War began in February 1904 with a preemptive Japanese attack on the Russian Pacific Fleet in Port Arthur, prior to a formal declaration of war.

With the Russian Far East fleet trapped at Port Arthur, the only other Russian Fleet was the Baltic Fleet; it was half a world away, but the decision was made to send the fleet on a nine-month voyage to the east. The United Kingdom would not allow the Russian navy to use the Suez Canal, due to its alliance with the Empire of Japan, and due to the Dogger Bank incident where the Baltic Fleet mistakenly fired on British fishing boats in the North Sea. The Baltic Fleet traversed the world to lift the blockade on Port Arthur, but after many misadventures on the way, was nearly annihilated by the Japanese in the Battle of Tsushima. On land the Imperial Russian Army experienced logistical problems. While commands and supplies came from St. Petersburg, combat took place in east Asian ports with only the Trans-Siberian Railway for transport of supplies as well as troops both ways. The 9,200-kilometre (5,700 mi) rail line between St. Petersburg and Port Arthur was single-track, with no track around Lake Baikal, allowing only gradual build-up of the forces on the front. Besieged Port Arthur fell to the Japanese, after nine months of resistance.

As Russia faced imminent defeat by the Japanese, the call for peace grew. Nicholas's mother, as well as his cousin Emperor Wilhelm II, urged Nicholas to negotiate for peace. Despite the efforts, Nicholas remained evasive, sending a telegram to the Kaiser on 10 October that it was his intent to keep on fighting until the Japanese were driven from Manchuria. It was not until 27–28 May 1905 and the annihilation of the Russian fleet by the Japanese, that Nicholas finally decided to sue for peace. Nicholas II accepted American mediation, appointing Sergei Witte chief plenipotentiary for the peace talks. The war was ended by the signing of the Treaty of Portsmouth.

==== Tsar's confidence in victory ====
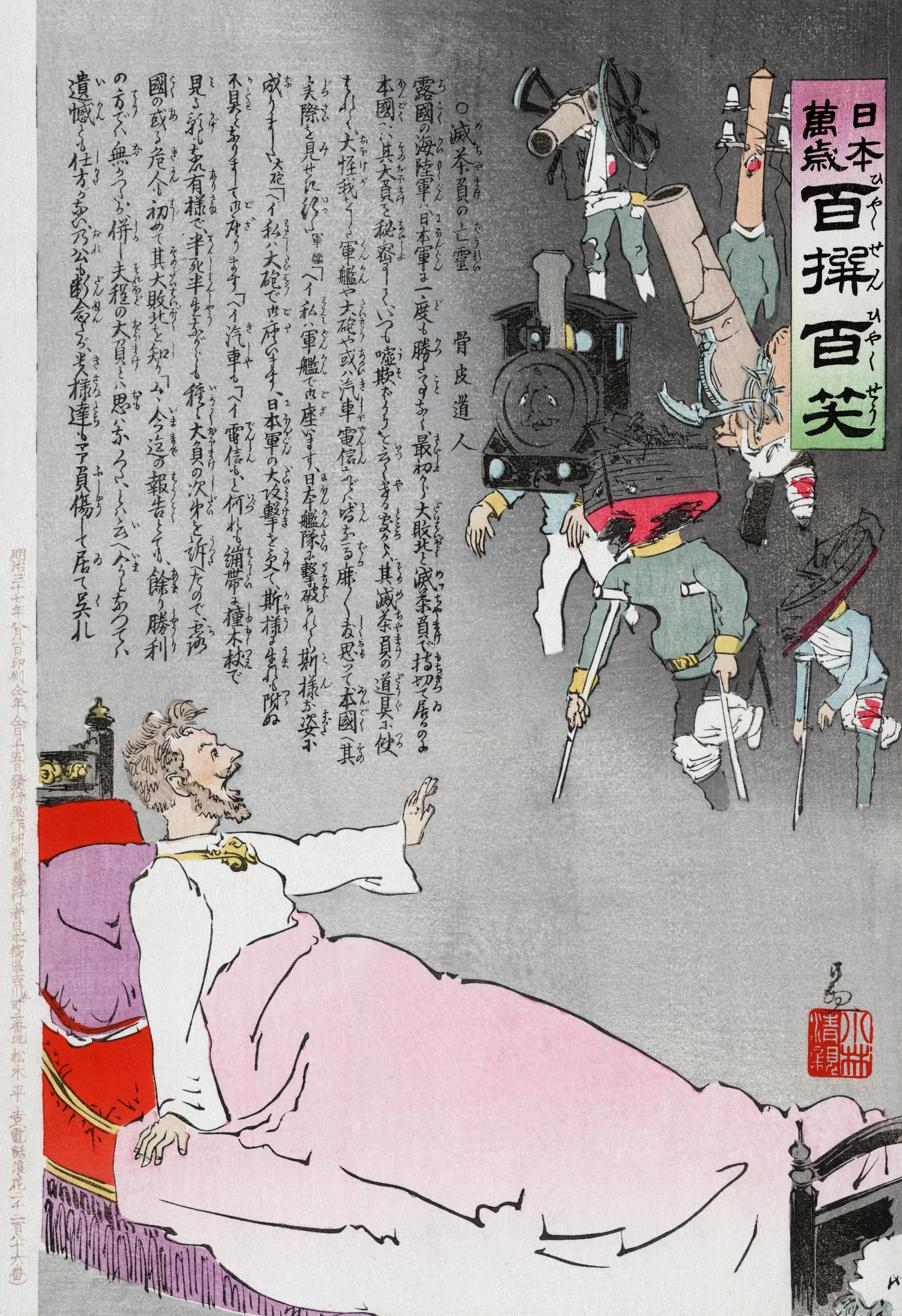
Japanese propaganda poster depicting Nicholas beset by nightmares about Russia's defeat.

Nicholas's stance on the war was so at variance with the obvious facts that many observers were baffled. He saw the war as an easy God-given victory that would raise Russian morale and patriotism. He ignored the financial repercussions of a long-distance war. Rotem Kowner argues that during his visit to Japan in 1891, where Nicholas was attacked by a Japanese policeman, he regarded the Japanese as small of stature, feminine, weak, and inferior. He ignored reports of the prowess of Japanese soldiers in the First Sino-Japanese War (1894–95) and reports on the capabilities of the Imperial Japanese Navy, as well as negative reports on the lack of readiness of Russian forces.

Before the Japanese attack on Port Arthur, Nicholas held firm to the belief that there would be no war. Despite the onset of the war and the many defeats Russia suffered, Nicholas still believed in, and expected, a final victory, maintaining an image of the racial inferiority and military weakness of the Japanese. Throughout the war, the tsar demonstrated total confidence in Russia's ultimate triumph. His advisors never gave him a clear picture of Russia's weaknesses. Despite the continuous military disasters Nicholas believed victory was near at hand. Losing his navy at Tsushima finally persuaded him to agree to peace negotiations. Even then he insisted on the option of reopening hostilities if peace conditions were unfavorable. He forbade his chief negotiator Count Witte to agree to either indemnity payments or loss of territory. Nicholas remained adamantly opposed to any concessions. Peace was made, but Witte did so by disobeying the tsar and ceding southern Sakhalin to Japan.

=== Anti-Jewish pogroms of 1903–1906 ===
The Kishinev newspaper Bessarabets, which published antisemitic materials, received funds from Viacheslav Plehve, Minister of the Interior. These publications served to fuel the Kishinev pogrom (rioting). The government of Nicholas II formally condemned the rioting and dismissed the regional governor, with the perpetrators arrested and punished by the court. Leadership of the Russian Orthodox Church also condemned antisemitic pogroms. Appeals to the faithful condemning the pogroms were read publicly in all churches of Russia. In private Nicholas expressed his admiration for the mobs, viewing antisemitism as a useful tool for unifying the people behind the government; however in 1911, following the assassination of Pyotr Stolypin by the Jewish revolutionary Dmitry Bogrov, he approved of government efforts to prevent antisemitic pogroms.

=== Russification of Finland ===
In Finland, Nicholas had become associated with deeply unpopular Russification measures. These began with the February Manifesto proclaimed by Nicholas II in 1899, which restricted Finland's autonomy and instigated a period of censorship and political repression. A petition of protest signed by more than 500,000 Finns was collected against the manifesto and delivered to St. Petersburg by a delegation of 500 people, but they were not received by Nicholas. Russification measures were reintroduced in 1908 after a temporary suspension in the aftermath of the 1905 Revolution, and Nicholas received an icy reception when he made his only visit to Helsinki on 10 March 1915.

=== Bloody Sunday (1905) ===
Tsar Nicholas of Russia mounts his horse (1905?), unknown cinematographer of the Edison Manufacturing Company.

On 19 January [O.S. 6 January] 1905 an incident interpreted as an assassination attempt on the Emperor occurred.

A few days prior to what would become known as Bloody Sunday (9 (22) January 1905), priest and labor leader Georgy Gapon informed the government of a forthcoming procession to the Winter Palace to hand a workers' petition to the tsar. On Saturday, 8 (21) January, the ministers convened to consider the situation. There was never any thought that the tsar, who had left the capital for Tsarskoye Selo on the advice of the ministers, would actually meet Gapon; the suggestion that some other member of the imperial family receive the petition was rejected.

Finally informed by the Prefect of Police that he lacked the men to pluck Gapon from among his followers and place him under arrest, the newly appointed Minister of the Interior, Prince Sviatopolk-Mirsky, and his colleagues decided to bring additional troops to reinforce the city. That evening Nicholas wrote in his diary, "Troops have been brought from the outskirts to reinforce the garrison. Up to now the workers have been calm. Their number is estimated at 120,000. At the head of their union is a kind of socialist priest named Gapon. Mirsky came this evening to present his report on the measures taken."

On Sunday, 9 (22) January 1905, Gapon began his march. Locking arms, the workers marched peacefully through the streets. Some carried religious icons and banners, as well as national flags and portraits of the tsar. As they walked, they sang hymns and God Save The Tsar. At 2 pm all of the converging processions were scheduled to arrive at the Winter Palace. There was no single confrontation with the troops. Throughout the city, at bridges on strategic boulevards, the marchers found their way blocked by lines of infantry, backed by Cossacks and hussars; and the soldiers opened fire on the crowd.

The official number of victims was 92 dead and several hundred wounded. Gapon vanished and the other leaders of the march were seized. Expelled from the capital, they circulated through the empire, increasing the casualties. As bullets riddled their icons, their banners and their portraits of Nicholas, the people shrieked, "The Tsar will not help us!" Outside Russia, the future British Labour Prime Minister Ramsay MacDonald attacked the Tsar, calling him a "blood-stained creature and a common murderer".

That evening Nicholas wrote in his diary:

Difficult day! In St. Petersburg there were serious disturbances due to the desire of workers to get to the Winter Palace. The troops had to shoot in different places of the city, there were many dead and wounded. Lord, how painful and bad!

His younger sister, Grand Duchess Olga Alexandrovna, wrote afterwards:

Nicky had the police report a few days before. That Saturday he telephoned my mother at the Anitchkov and said that she and I were to leave for Gatchina at once. He and Alicky went to Tsarskoye Selo. Insofar as I remember, my Uncles Vladimir and Nicholas were the only members of the family left in St. Petersburg, but there may have been others. I felt at the time that all those arrangements were hideously wrong. Nicky's ministers and the Chief of Police had it all their way. My mother and I wanted him to stay in St. Petersburg and to face the crowd. I am positive that, for all the ugly mood of some of the workmen, Nicky's appearance would have calmed them. They would have presented their petition and gone back to their homes. But that wretched Epiphany incident (Note: During the traditional Blessing of the Waters on the Neva River on January 6 (19), grapeshot loaded in a cannon firing a salute landed near the Emperor.) had left all the senior officials in a state of panic. They kept on telling Nicky that he had no right to run such a risk, that he owed it to the country to leave the capital, that even with the utmost precautions taken there might always be some loophole left. My mother and I did all we could to persuade him that the ministers' advice was wrong, but Nicky preferred to follow it and he was the first to repent when he heard of the tragic outcome.

From his hiding place Gapon issued a letter, stating "Nicholas Romanov, formerly Tsar and at present soul-murderer of the Russian empire. The innocent blood of workers, their wives and children lies forever between you and the Russian people ... May all the blood which must be spilled fall upon you, you Hangman. I call upon all the socialist parties of Russia to come to an immediate agreement among themselves and bring an armed uprising against Tsarism."

=== 1905 Revolution ===
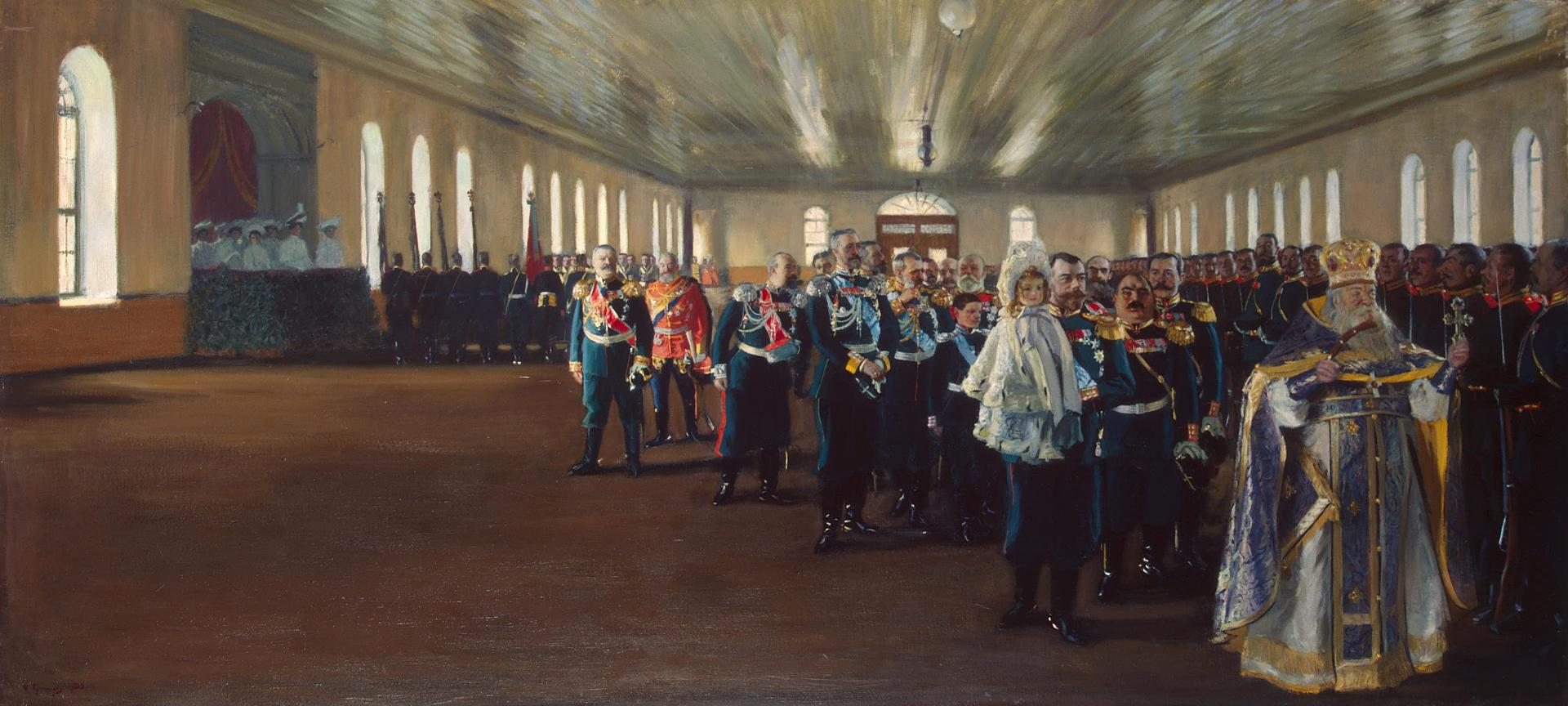
Nicholas II visiting the Finland Guard Regiment, 1905

Confronted with growing opposition and after consulting with Witte and Prince Sviatopolk-Mirsky, the Tsar issued a reform ukase on 25 December 1904 with vague promises. In hopes of cutting the rebellion short, many demonstrators were shot on Bloody Sunday (1905) as they tried to march to the Winter Palace in St. Petersburg. Dmitri Feodorovich Trepov was ordered to take drastic measures to stop the revolutionary activity. Grand Duke Sergei was killed in February by a revolutionary's bomb in Moscow as he left the Kremlin. On 3 March the tsar condemned the revolutionaries. Meanwhile, Witte recommended that a manifesto be issued. Schemes of reform would be elaborated by Ivan Goremykin and a committee consisting of elected representatives of the zemstvos and municipal councils under the presidency of Witte. In June the battleship Potemkin, part of the Black Sea Fleet, mutinied.

Around August/September, after his diplomatic success on ending the Russo-Japanese War, Witte wrote to the Tsar stressing the urgent need for political reforms at home. The Tsar remained quite impassive and indulgent; he spent most of that autumn hunting. With the defeat of Russia by a non-Western power, the prestige and authority of the autocratic regime fell significantly. (Note: This was especially true among the illiterate peasantry or 'dark masses' who although they followed their own (almost pagan) rituals, had until this point held complete naive faith in the Tsar.) Tsar Nicholas II, taken by surprise by the events, reacted with anger and bewilderment. He wrote to his mother after months of disorder:

It makes me sick to read the news! Nothing but strikes in schools and factories, murdered policemen, Cossacks and soldiers, riots, disorder, mutinies. But the ministers, instead of acting with quick decision, only assemble in council like a lot of frightened hens and cackle about providing united ministerial action... ominous quiet days began, quiet indeed because there was complete order in the streets, but at the same time everybody knew that something was going to happen—the troops were waiting for the signal, but the other side would not begin. One had the same feeling, as before a thunderstorm in summer! Everybody was on edge and extremely nervous and of course, that sort of strain could not go on for long.... We are in the midst of a revolution with an administrative apparatus entirely disorganized, and in this lies the main danger.

In October a railway strike developed into a general strike which paralysed the country. In a city without electricity, Witte told Nicholas II "that the country was at the verge of a cataclysmic revolution". The Tsar accepted the draft, hurriedly outlined by Aleksei D. Obolensky. The Emperor and Autocrat of All the Russias was forced to sign the October Manifesto agreeing to the establishment of the Imperial Duma, and to give up part of his unlimited autocracy. The freedom of religion clause outraged the Church because it allowed people to switch to evangelical Protestantism, which they denounced as heresy.

For the next six months, Witte was the prime minister. According to Harold Williams: "That government was almost paralyzed from the beginning." On 8 November (Note: 26 October O.S.) 1905 the tsar appointed Dmitri Feodorovich Trepov Master of the Palace (without consulting Witte), and had daily contact with the emperor; his influence at court was paramount. On 14 November, (Note: 1 November O.S.) Princess Milica of Montenegro presented Grigori Rasputin to Tsar Nicholas and his wife (who by then had a hemophiliac son) at Peterhof Palace.

=== Relationship with the Duma ===
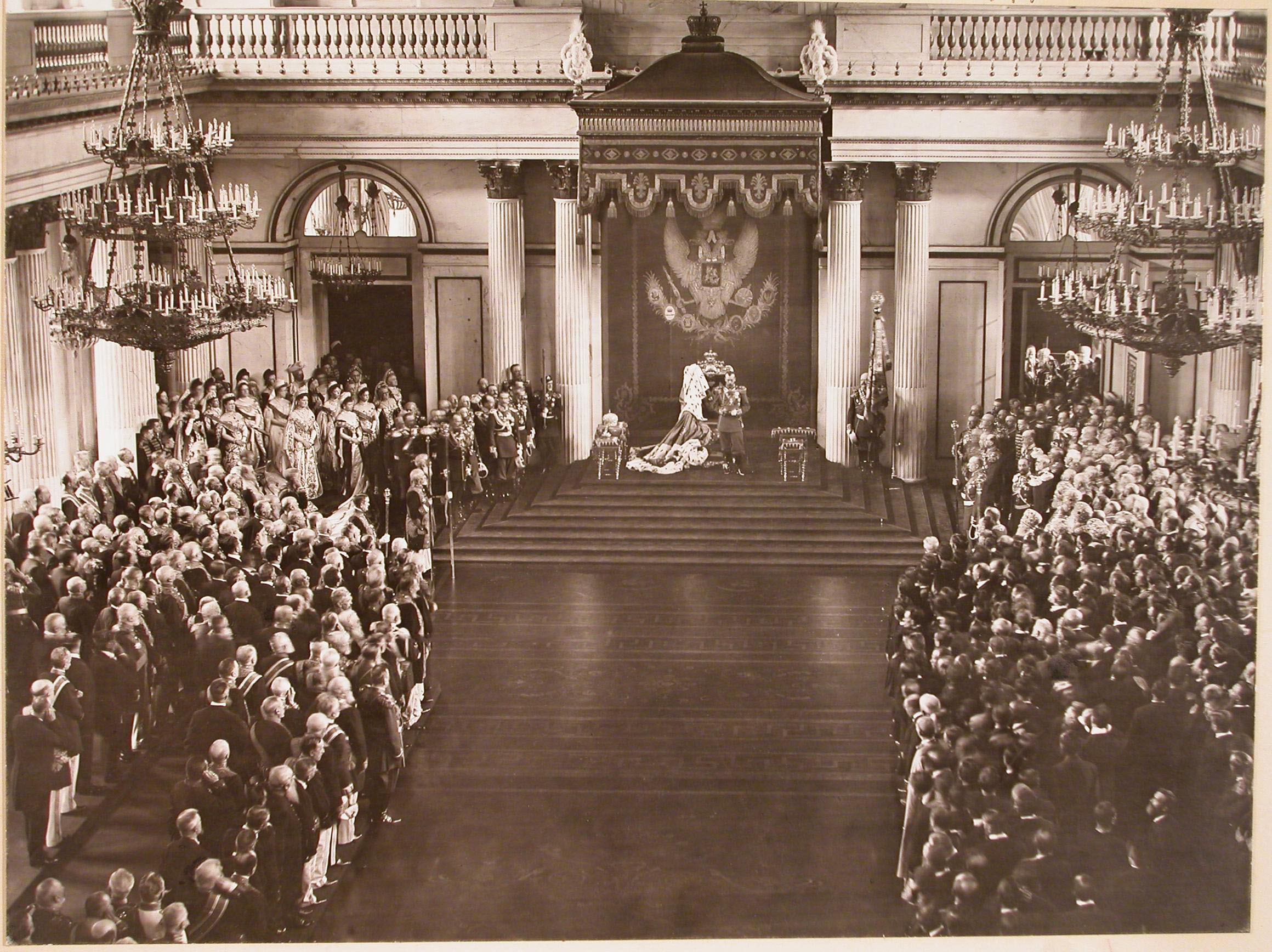
Nicholas II's opening speech before the two chambers of the State Duma in the Winter Palace, 10 May 1906

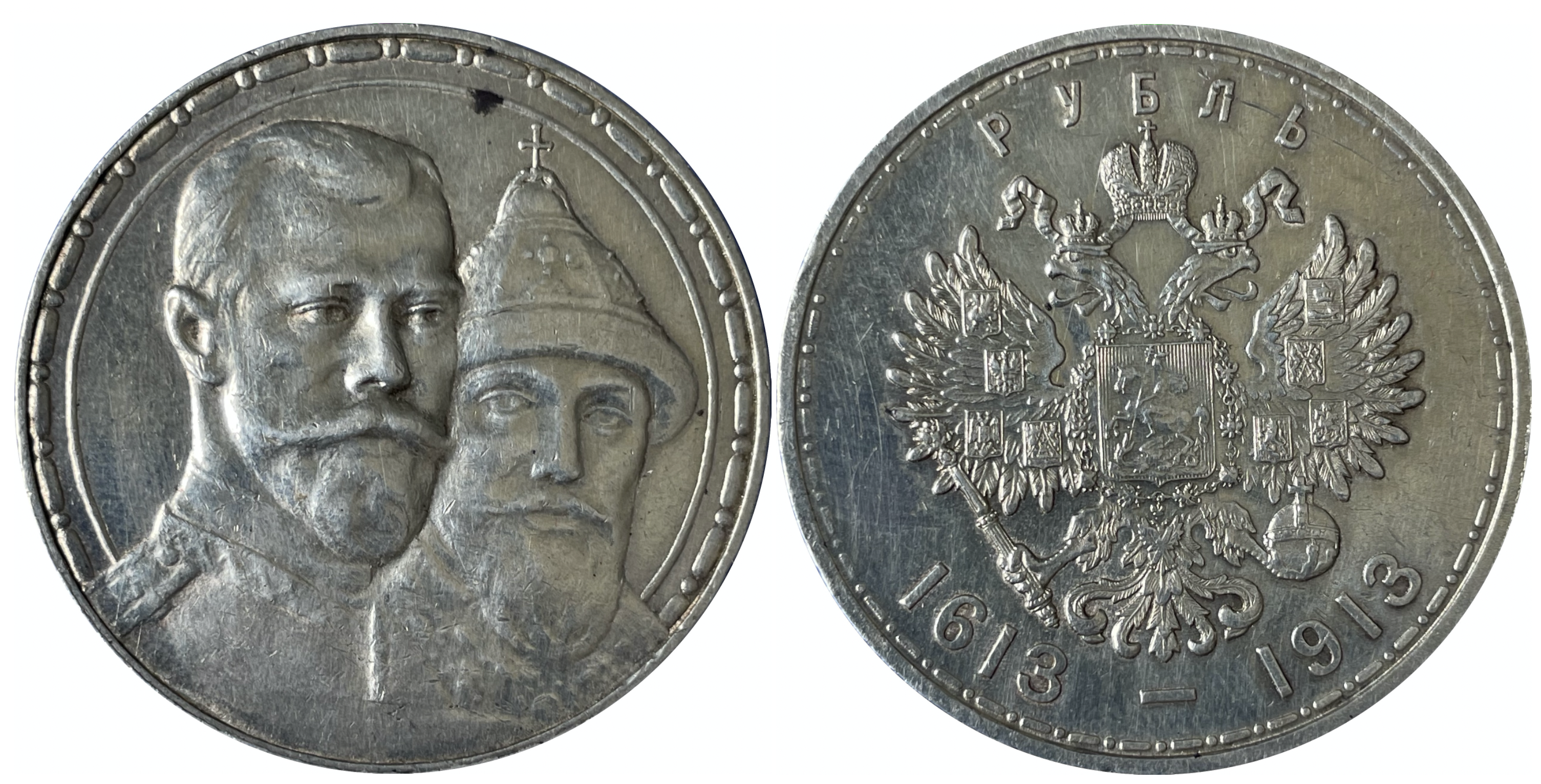
Silver coin: 1 ruble Nikolai II_Romanov Dynasty – 1913 – On the obverse of the coin features two rulers: left Emperor Nikolas II in military uniform of the life guards of the 4th infantry regiment of the Imperial family, right Michael I in Royal robes and Monomakh's Cap. Portraits made in a circular frame around of a Greek ornament.

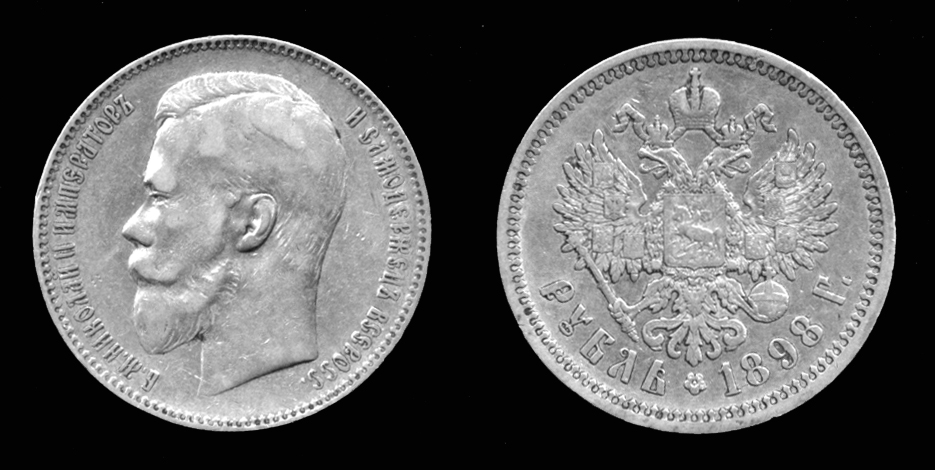
One ruble silver coin of Nicholas II, dated 1898, with the Imperial coat-of-arms on the reverse. The Russian inscription reads: B[ozheyu] M[ilostyu] Nikolay Imperator i Samoderzhets Vse[ya] Ross[ii].[iyskiy]. The English translation is: "By the grace of God, Nicholas II, Emperor and Autocrat of All the Russias".

Under pressure from the attempted 1905 Russian Revolution, on 5 August of that year Nicholas II issued a manifesto about the convocation of the State Duma, known as the Bulygin Duma, initially thought to be an advisory organ. In the October Manifesto, the Tsar pledged to introduce basic civil liberties, provide for broad participation in the State Duma, and endow the Duma with legislative and oversight powers. He was determined, however, to preserve his autocracy even in the context of reform. This was signalled in the text of the 1906 constitution. He was described as the supreme autocrat, and retained sweeping executive powers, also in church affairs. His cabinet ministers were not allowed to interfere with nor assist one another; they were responsible only to him.

Nicholas's relations with the Duma were poor. The First Duma, with a majority of Kadets, almost immediately came into conflict with him. Scarcely had the 524 members sat down at the Tauride Palace when they formulated an 'Address to the Throne'. It demanded universal suffrage, radical land reform, the release of all political prisoners and the dismissal of ministers appointed by the Tsar in favour of ministers acceptable to the Duma. Grand Duchess Olga, Nicholas's sister, later wrote:

There was such gloom at Tsarskoye Selo. I did not understand anything about politics. I just felt everything was going wrong with the country and all of us. The October Constitution did not seem to satisfy anyone. I went with my mother to the first Duma. I remember the large group of deputies from among peasants and factory people. The peasants looked sullen. But the workmen were worse: they looked as though they hated us. I remember the distress in Alicky's eyes.

Minister of the Court Count Vladimir Frederiks commented, "The Deputies, they give one the impression of a gang of criminals who are only waiting for the signal to throw themselves upon the ministers and cut their throats. I will never again set foot among those people." The Dowager Empress noticed "incomprehensible hatred."

Although Nicholas initially had a good relationship with his prime minister, Sergei Witte, Alexandra distrusted him as he had instigated an investigation of Grigori Rasputin and, as the political situation deteriorated, Nicholas dissolved the Duma. The Duma was populated with radicals, many of whom wished to push through legislation that would abolish private property ownership, among other things. Witte, unable to grasp the seemingly insurmountable problems of reforming Russia and the monarchy, wrote to Nicholas on 14 April 1906 resigning his office (however, other accounts have said that Witte was forced to resign by the emperor). Nicholas was not ungracious to Witte and an Imperial Rescript was published on 22 April creating Witte a Knight of the Order of Saint Alexander Nevsky with diamonds (the last two words were written in the emperor's own hand, followed by "I remain unalterably well-disposed to you and sincerely grateful, for ever more Nicholas.").

A second Duma met for the first time in February 1907. The leftist parties—including the Social Democrats and the Socialist Revolutionaries, who had boycotted the First Duma—had won 200 seats in the Second, more than a third of the membership. Again Nicholas waited impatiently to rid himself of the Duma. In two letters to his mother he let his bitterness flow:

A grotesque deputation is coming from England to see liberal members of the Duma. Uncle Bertie informed us that they were very sorry but were unable to take action to stop their coming. Their famous "liberty", of course. How angry they would be if a deputation went from us to the Irish to wish them success in their struggle against their government.

A little while later he further wrote:

All would be well if everything said in the Duma remained within its walls. Every word spoken, however, comes out in the next day's papers which are avidly read by everyone. In many places the populace is getting restive again. They begin to talk about land once more and are waiting to see what the Duma is going to say on the question. I am getting telegrams from everywhere, petitioning me to order a dissolution, but it is too early for that. One has to let them do something manifestly stupid or mean and then—slap! And they are gone!

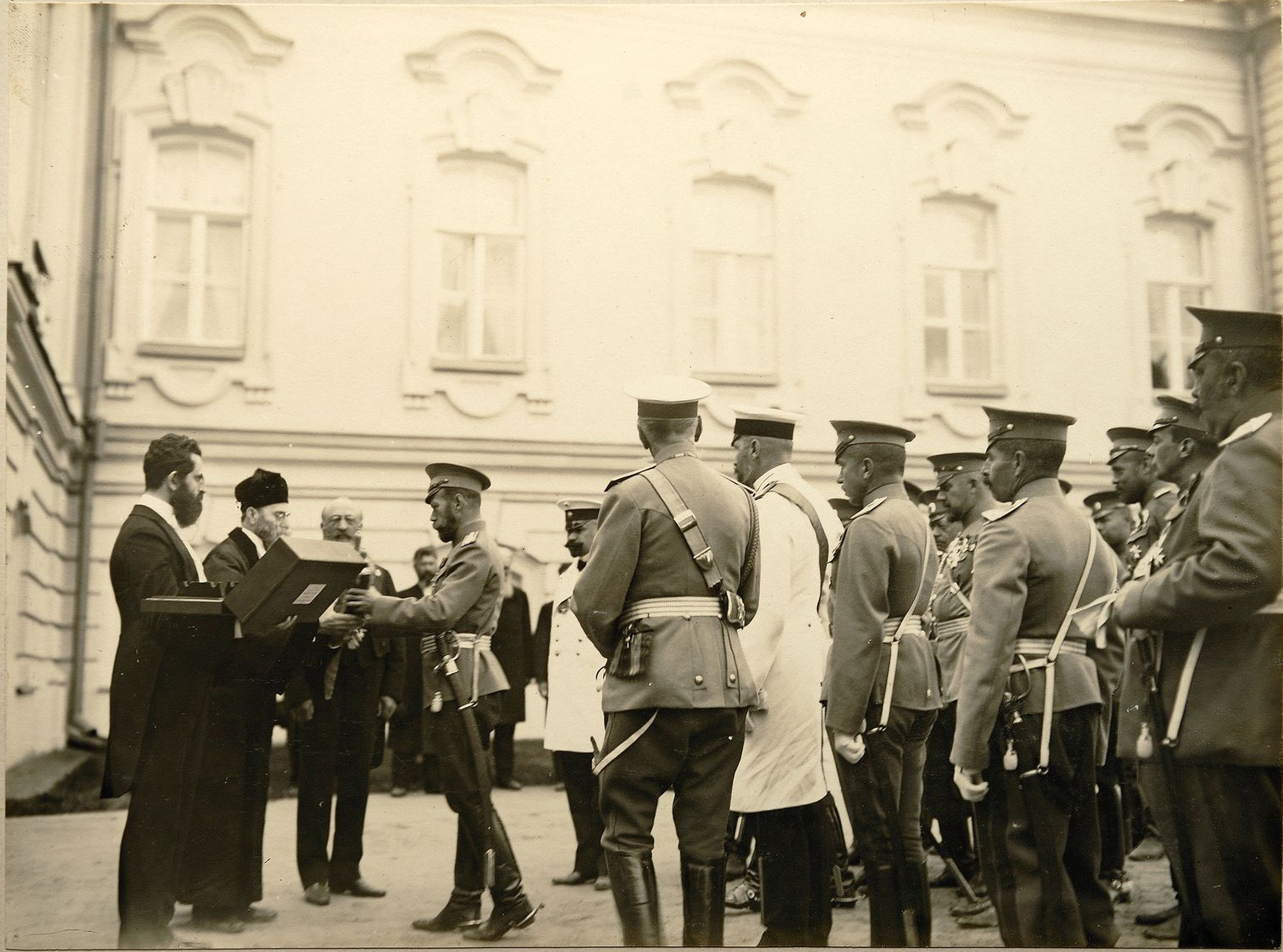
Nicholas II, Stolypin and the Jewish delegation during the Tsar's visit to Kiev in 1911

After the Second Duma resulted in similar problems, the new prime minister Pyotr Stolypin (whom Witte described as "reactionary") unilaterally dissolved it, and changed the electoral laws to allow for future Dumas to have a more conservative content, and to be dominated by the liberal-conservative Octobrist Party of Alexander Guchkov. Stolypin, a skilful politician, had ambitious plans for reform. These included making loans available to the lower classes to enable them to buy land, with the intent of forming a farming class loyal to the crown. Nevertheless, when the Duma remained hostile, Stolypin had no qualms about invoking Article 87 of the Fundamental Laws, which empowered the tsar to issue 'urgent and extraordinary' emergency decrees 'during the recess of the State Duma'. Stolypin's most famous legislative act, the change in peasant land tenure, was promulgated under Article 87.

The third Duma remained an independent body. This time the members proceeded cautiously. Instead of hurling themselves at the government, opposing parties within the Duma worked to develop the body as a whole. In the classic manner of the British Parliament, the Duma reached for power grasping for the national purse strings. The Duma had the right to question ministers behind closed doors as to their proposed expenditures. These sessions, endorsed by Stolypin, were educational for both sides, and, in time, mutual antagonism was replaced by mutual respect. Even the sensitive area of military expenditure, where the October Manifesto clearly had reserved decisions to the throne, a Duma commission began to operate. Composed of aggressive patriots no less anxious than Nicholas to restore the fallen honour of Russian arms, the Duma commission frequently recommended expenditures even larger than those proposed.

With the passage of time, Nicholas also began to have confidence in the Duma. "This Duma cannot be reproached with an attempt to seize power and there is no need at all to quarrel with it," he said to Stolypin in 1909. Nevertheless, Stolypin's plans were undercut by conservatives at court. Although the tsar at first supported him, he finally sided with the arch critics. Reactionaries such as Prince Vladimir Nikolayevich Orlov never tired of telling the tsar that the very existence of the Duma was a blot on the autocracy. Stolypin, they whispered, was a traitor and secret revolutionary who was conniving with the Duma to steal the prerogatives assigned the tsar by God. Witte also engaged in constant intrigue against Stolypin. Although Stolypin had had nothing to do with Witte's fall, Witte blamed him. Stolypin had unwittingly angered the tsaritsa. He had ordered an investigation into Rasputin and presented it to the tsar, who read it but did nothing. Stolypin, on his own authority, ordered Rasputin to leave St. Petersburg. Alexandra protested vehemently but Nicholas refused to overrule his prime minister, who had more influence with the emperor.

By the time of Stolypin's assassination in September 1911, Stolypin had grown weary of the burdens of office. For a man who preferred clear decisive action, working with a sovereign who believed in fatalism and mysticism was frustrating. As an example, Nicholas once returned a document unsigned with the note:

Despite most convincing arguments in favour of adopting a positive decision in this matter, an inner voice keeps on insisting more and more that I do not accept responsibility for it. So far my conscience has not deceived me. Therefore I intend in this case to follow its dictates. I know that you, too, believe that 'a Tsar's heart is in God's hands.' Let it be so. For all laws established by me I bear a great responsibility before God, and I am ready to answer for my decision at any time.

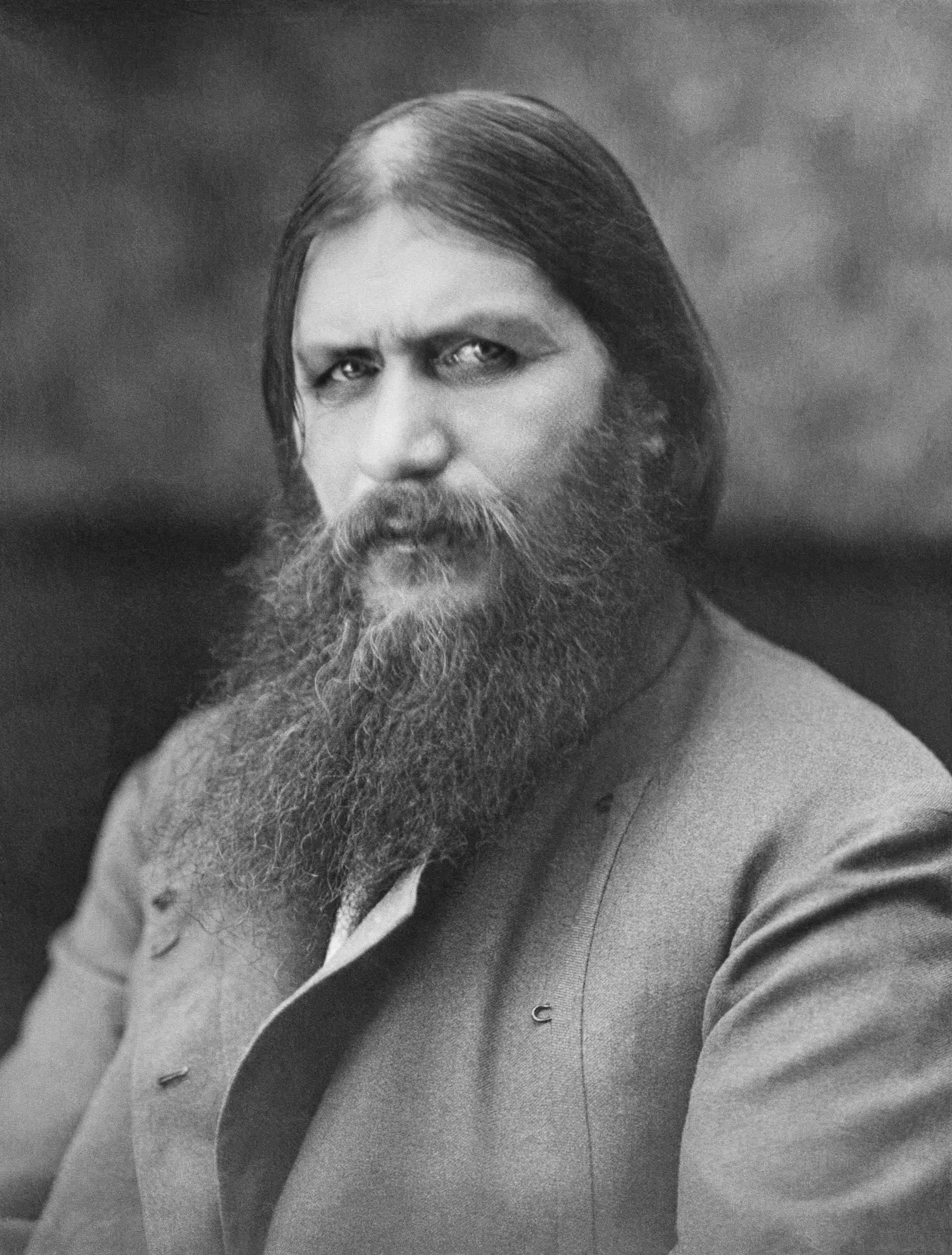
Grigori Rasputin

Alexandra, believing that Stolypin had severed the bonds that her son depended on for life, hated the prime minister. In March 1911, in a fit of anger stating that he no longer commanded the imperial confidence, Stolypin asked to be relieved of his office. Two years earlier when Stolypin had casually mentioned resigning to Nicholas he was informed: "This is not a question of confidence or lack of it. It is my will. Remember that we live in Russia, not abroad...and therefore I shall not consider the possibility of any resignation." He was assassinated in September 1911.

In 1912, a fourth Duma was elected with almost the same membership as the third. "The Duma started too fast. Now it is slower, but better, and more lasting", stated Nicholas to Sir Bernard Pares.

The First World War developed badly for Russia. By late 1916, Romanov family desperation reached the point that Grand Duke Paul Alexandrovich, younger brother of Alexander III and the Tsar's only surviving uncle, was deputed to beg Nicholas to grant a constitution and a government responsible to the Duma. Nicholas sternly and adamantly refused, reproaching his uncle for asking him to break his coronation oath to maintain autocratic power for his successors. In the Duma on 2 December 1916, Vladimir Purishkevich, a fervent patriot, monarchist and war worker, denounced the dark forces which surrounded the throne in a thunderous two-hour speech which was tumultuously applauded. "Revolution threatens," he warned, "and an obscure peasant shall govern Russia no longer!".

=== Tsarevich Alexei's illness and Rasputin ===
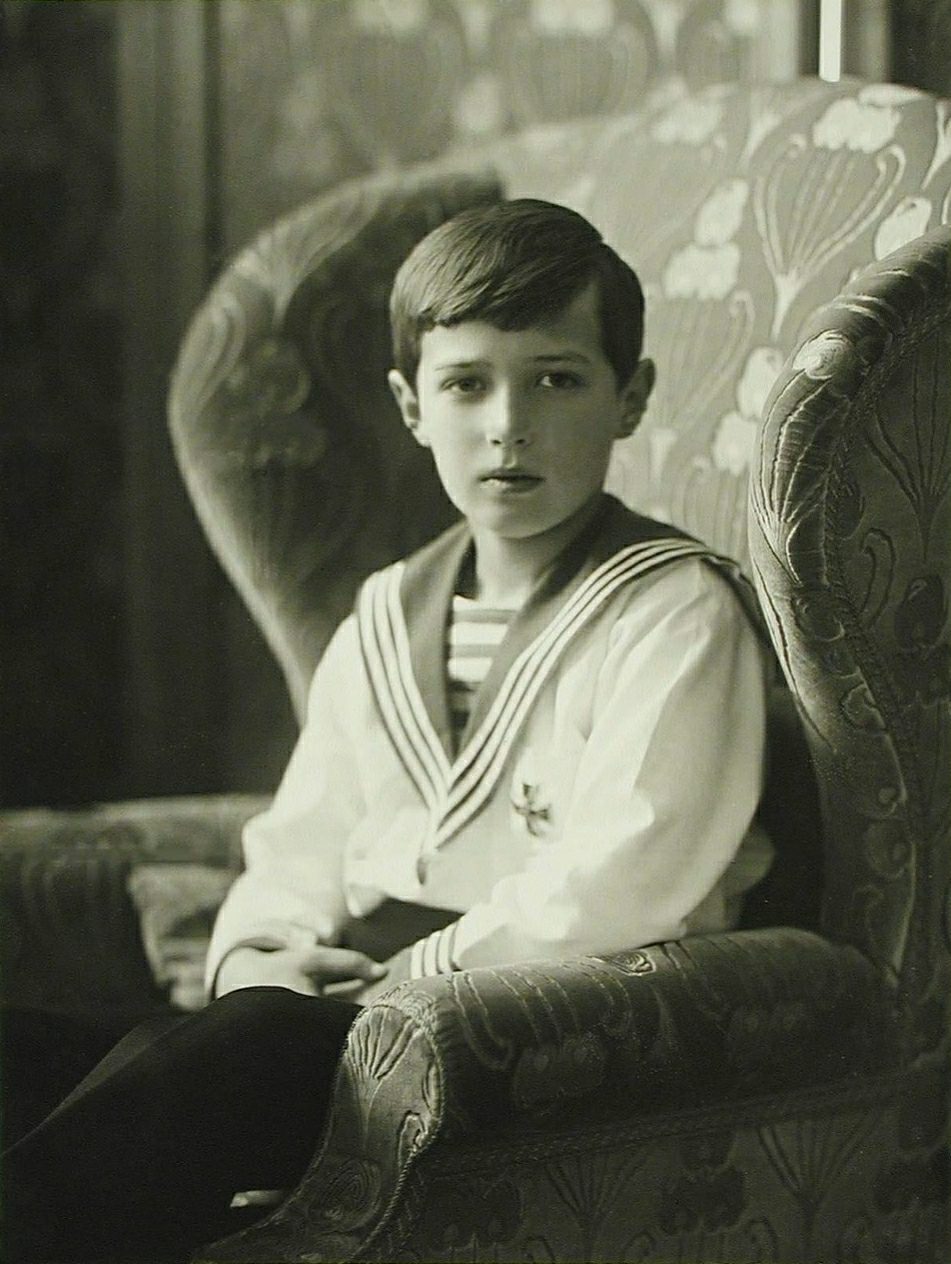
Alexei in 1913

Further complicating domestic matters was the matter of the succession. Alexandra bore Nicholas four daughters, Grand Duchess Olga in 1895, Grand Duchess Tatiana in 1897, Grand Duchess Maria in 1899, and Grand Duchess Anastasia in 1901, before their son Alexei was born on 12 August 1904. The young heir was afflicted with Hemophilia B, a hereditary disease that prevents blood from clotting properly, which at that time was untreatable and usually led to early death. As a granddaughter of Queen Victoria, Alexandra carried the same gene mutation that afflicted several of the major European royal houses, such as Prussia and Spain.

Before Rasputin's arrival, the tsarina and the tsar had consulted numerous mystics, charlatans, "holy fools", and miracle workers. The royal behavior was not some odd aberration, but a deliberate retreat from the secular social and economic forces of his time—an act of faith and vote of confidence in a spiritual past. They had set themselves up for the greatest spiritual advisor and manipulator in Russian history.

Because of the fragility of the autocracy at this time, Nicholas and Alexandra chose to keep secret Alexei's condition. Even within the household, many were unaware of the exact nature of the tsesarevich's illness. At first Alexandra turned to Russian doctors and medics to treat Alexei; however, their treatments generally failed, and Alexandra increasingly turned to mystics and holy men (or starets as they were called in Russian). One of these starets, an illiterate Siberian named Grigori Rasputin, gained amazing success. Rasputin's influence over Empress Alexandra, and consequently the tsar himself, grew even stronger after 1912 when the tsesarevich nearly died from an injury. His bleeding grew steadily worse as doctors despaired, and priests administered the Last Sacrament. In desperation, Alexandra called upon Rasputin, to which he replied, "God has seen your tears and heard your prayers. Do not grieve. The Little One will not die. Do not allow the doctors to bother him too much."

=== European affairs ===
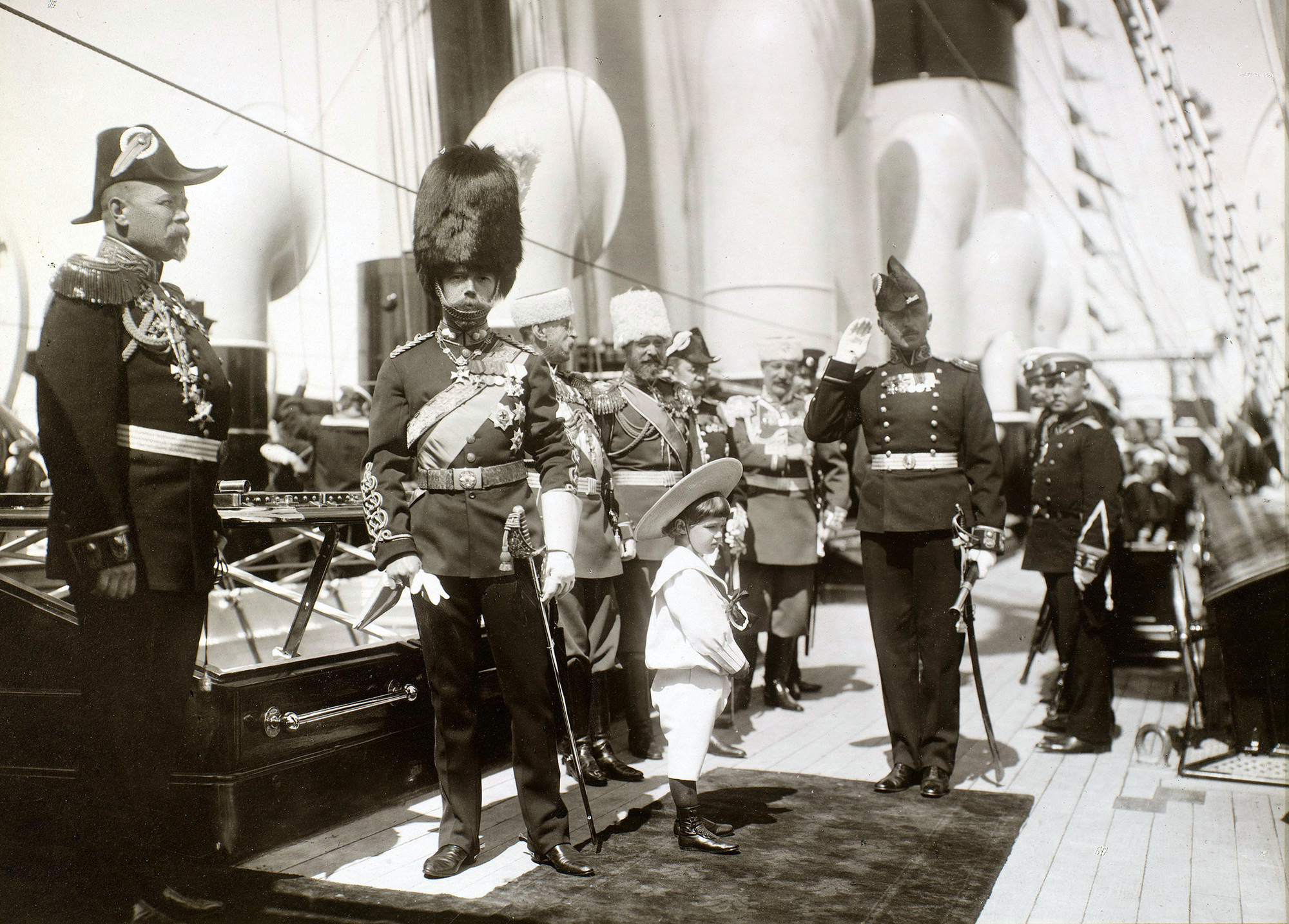
Nicholas II and his son Alexei aboard the Imperial yacht Standart, during King Edward VII's state visit to Russia in Reval, 1908

In 1907, to end longstanding controversies over central Asia, Russia and the United Kingdom signed the Anglo-Russian Convention that resolved most of the problems generated for decades by The Great Game. The UK had already entered into the Entente Cordiale with France in 1904, and the Anglo-Russian Convention led to the formation of the Triple Entente.

The following year, in May 1908, Nicholas and Alexandra's shared "Uncle Bertie" and "Aunt Alix", Britain's King Edward VII and Queen Alexandra, made a state visit to Russia, being the first reigning British monarchs to do so. However, they did not set foot on Russian soil. Instead, they stayed aboard their yachts, meeting off the coast of modern-day Tallinn. The purpose of this three-day meeting was to sign contracts of political and military assistance between the United Kingdom and Russia. With the foreign ministers of both countries present, a contract about changes in Macedonia and the weakening of the Ottoman Empire was signed. This meeting ignited the Young Turk Revolution in the Ottoman Empire.

Later that year, Nicholas was taken off guard by the news that his foreign minister, Alexander Izvolsky, had entered into a secret agreement with the Austro-Hungarian foreign minister, Count Alois von Aehrenthal, agreeing that, in exchange for Russian naval access to the Dardanelles and the Bosporus Strait, Russia would not oppose the Austrian annexation of Bosnia and Herzegovina, a revision of the 1878 Treaty of Berlin. When Austria-Hungary did annex this territory that October, it precipitated the Bosnian Crisis. When Russia protested about the annexation, the Austrians threatened to leak secret communications between Izvolsky and Aehrenthal, prompting Nicholas to complain in a letter to Emperor Franz Joseph, about a breach of confidence. In 1909, in the wake of the Anglo-Russian convention, the Russian imperial family made a visit to England, staying on the Isle of Wight for Cowes Week.

On 5 July 1912 a meeting was held in Paldiski between Nicholas II and the German emperor Wilhelm II. Wilhelm II was aboard the ship Hohenzollern II, escorted by the battlecruiser Moltke. A lunch for fifty people was held at the Paldiski roadstead on Nicholas II's yacht Standart, where negotiations about the political situation in Europe were held. These negotiations failed to stop the approaching World War I.

In 1913, during the Balkan Wars, Nicholas personally offered to arbitrate between Serbia and Bulgaria. However, the Bulgarians rejected his offer. Also in 1913, Nicholas, albeit without Alexandra, made a visit to Berlin for the wedding of Kaiser Wilhelm II's daughter, Princess Victoria Louise, to a maternal cousin of Nicholas, Ernest Augustus, Duke of Brunswick. Nicholas was also joined by his cousin, King George V and his wife, Queen Mary.

=== Tercentenary ===
Nicholas II attending the inauguration of the Monument for Emperor Alexander I in Kishinev (3 June 1914)

In February 1913, Nicholas presided over the tercentenary celebrations for the Romanov Dynasty. On 21 February, a Te Deum took place at Kazan Cathedral, and a state reception at the Winter Palace. In May, Nicholas and the imperial family made a pilgrimage across the empire, retracing the route down the Volga River that was made by the teenage Michael Romanov from the Ipatiev Monastery in Kostroma to Moscow in 1613 when he finally agreed to become tsar.

On the eve of World War I, Russia was the most populous state in Europe. With 175 million inhabitants, it had almost 3 times the population of Germany, an army of 1.3 million men, and almost 5 million reservists. Its industrial growth, on the order of 5% per year between 1860 and 1913, and the vastness of its territory and natural resources made it a strategic giant. The Russian railway network grew from 50,000 kilometres (31,000 mi) in 1900 to 75,000 kilometres (47,000 mi) in 1914. Coal production rose from 6 million tonnes in 1890 to 36 million in 1914. Oil production, thanks to the Baku deposits, was the second largest in the world after the United States. In Germany, Chief of Staff Moltke predicted that, as a result of Russia's rapid growth, German military power would be outclassed by that of its adversaries from 1916 to 1917, while France, strengthened by the Franco-Russian alliance of 1892, expected the "Russian steamroller" to crush Germany at the first hostile move.

However, this power rested on unstable foundations. Russian industrial production, ranked 4th in the world, surpassed that of France and Austria-Hungary, but lagged far behind that of the top three countries, the United States, the United Kingdom, and Germany. The development of the army, railroads, and industries was largely dependent on government loans, notably from France, and on imports of foreign capital and technology. Interest on the debt, the highest in the world, tended to outstrip the trade surplus. In 1914, 90% of the mining sector, 100% of oil, 40% of metallurgy, and 50% of the chemical industry belonged to foreign firms. Despite high tariffs, the Russian industry was not very competitive, and the country had to import most of its machinery, while exports were mainly represented by agricultural products (63% in 1913) and wood (11%).

=== First World War ===
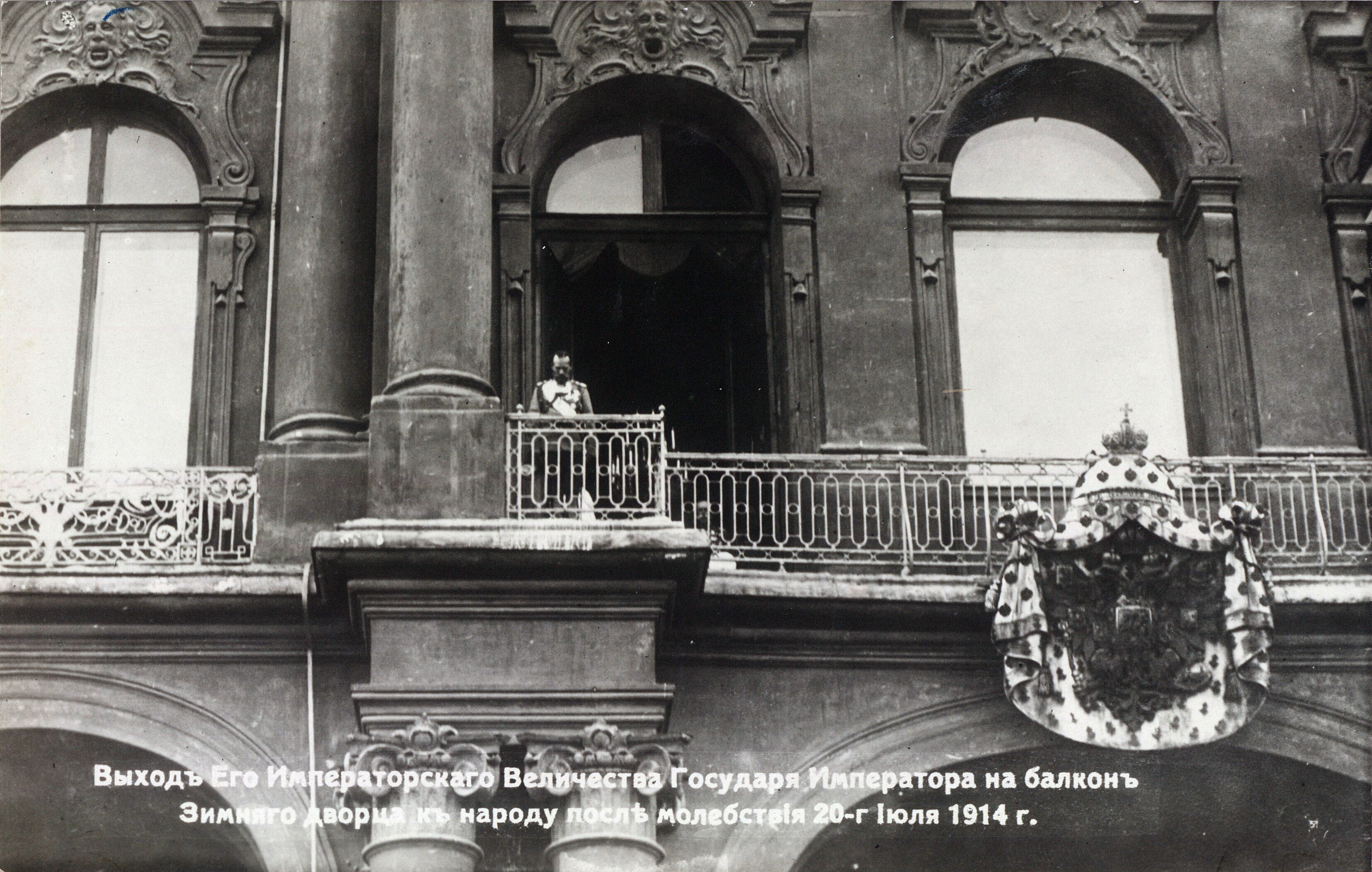
Nicholas II declaring war on Germany from the Winter Palace, 2 August 1914

On 28 June 1914 Archduke Franz Ferdinand of Austria, heir to the Austro-Hungarian throne, was assassinated by a Bosnian Serb in Sarajevo, who opposed Austria-Hungary's annexation of Bosnia-Herzegovina. War was avoidable, but leaders, diplomats and nineteenth-century alliances created a climate for conflict. The concept of Pan-Slavism and shared religion created public sympathy between Russia and Serbia. Territorial conflict created rivalries between Germany and France, between Austria-Hungary and Serbia, and so alliance networks developed across Europe. The Triple Entente and Triple Alliance networks were set before the war. Nicholas wanted neither to abandon Serbia to the ultimatum of Austria-Hungary, nor provoke a general war. In letters exchanged with Wilhelm of Germany (the "Willy–Nicky correspondence") the two proclaimed their desire for peace, and attempted to get the other to back down. Nicholas desired that Russia's mobilization be only against Austria-Hungary, in the hopes of preventing war with Germany.

On 25 July 1914, at his council of ministers, Nicholas decided to intervene in the Austro-Serbian conflict, a step toward general war. He put the army on "alert" on 25 July. Although this was not general mobilization, it threatened the German and Austro-Hungarian borders and looked like preparation for war. However, his army had no contingency plans for partial mobilization, and on 30 July 1914 Nicholas took the fateful step of confirming the order for general mobilization, despite being counselled against it.

On 28 July, Austria-Hungary declared war against Serbia. On 29 July 1914, Nicholas sent a telegram to Wilhelm with the suggestion to submit the Austro-Serbian problem to the Hague Conference. Wilhelm did not address the question of the Hague Conference in his reply. Count Witte told the French ambassador, Maurice Paléologue that from Russia's point of view the war was madness, Slav solidarity was unimportant and Russia could hope for nothing from the war. On 30 July, Russia ordered general mobilization, but still maintained it would not attack if peace talks began. Germany, reacting to the discovery of partial mobilization ordered on 25 July, announced its pre-mobilization posture. Germany requested Russia demobilize within the next twelve hours. In Saint Petersburg, at 7 pm, with the ultimatum to Russia having expired, the German ambassador met with the Russian foreign minister Sergey Sazonov, asked if Russia would reconsider, and then delivered the note accepting Russia's war challenge and declaring war on 1 August. Germany declared war on Russia on 1 August and its ally France on 3 August. On 6 August, Franz Joseph signed the Austro-Hungarian declaration of war on Russia.

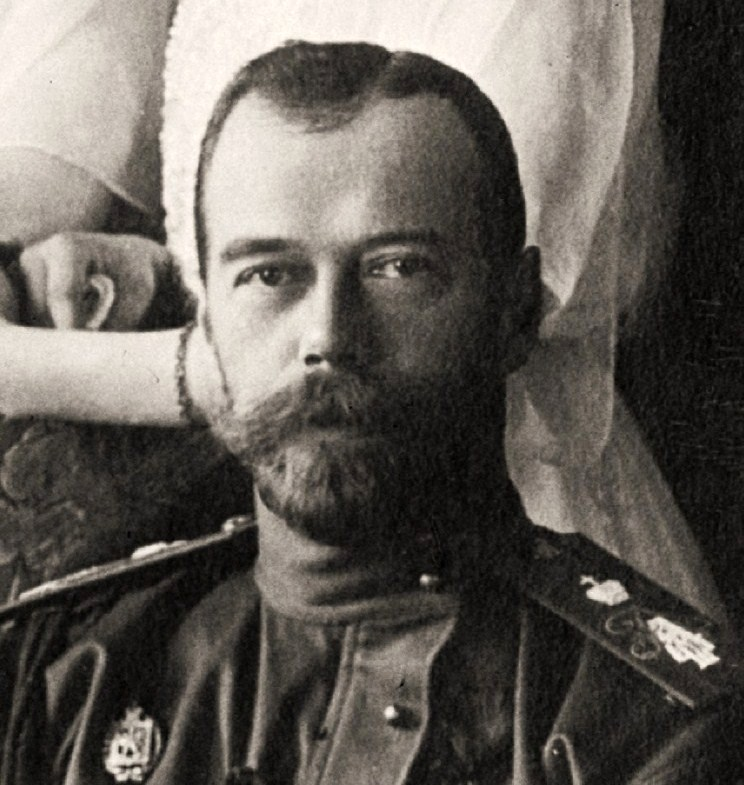
Nicholas II in 1914

The outbreak of war found Russia grossly unprepared. Russia and her allies placed their faith in her army, the 'Russian steamroller'. Its pre-war regular strength was 1,400,000; mobilization added 3,100,000 reserves and millions more stood ready behind them. In other respects, however, Russia was unprepared. Germany had ten times as much railway track per square mile, and whereas Russian soldiers travelled an average of 1,290 kilometres (800 mi) to reach the front, German soldiers traveled a quarter of that. Russian heavy industry was too small to equip the armies the Tsar could raise, and her reserves of munitions were small; while the Imperial German Army in 1914 was better equipped than any other, the Russians were short on artillery pieces, shells, motorized transports, and even boots. With the Baltic Sea barred by German U-boats and the Dardanelles by the guns of Germany's ally, the Ottoman Empire, Russia initially could receive help only via Archangel, which was frozen in winter, or via Vladivostok, which was over 6,400 kilometres (4,000 mi) from the front. By 1915, a railway was built north from Petrozavodsk to the Kola Gulf and this connection laid the foundation of the ice-free port of Murmansk. The Russian High Command was weakened by the contempt between Vladimir Sukhomlinov, the Minister of War, and incompetent Grand Duke Nicholas Nikolayevich who commanded the armies in the field. In spite of all this, an immediate attack was ordered against the German province of East Prussia. The Germans defeated the Russians, and the Battle of Tannenberg, where a Russian army was annihilated, cast a shadow over Russia's future. Russia had success against the Austro-Hungarian and Ottoman armies, but never succeeded against the German Army. In September 1914, to relieve pressure on France, the Russians were forced to halt a successful offensive against Austria-Hungary in Galicia to attack German-held Silesia.

A war of attrition set in on the Eastern Front, where the Russians faced the forces of the German and Austro-Hungarian armies, and suffered staggering losses. General Anton Denikin wrote, "The German heavy artillery swept away whole lines of trenches, and their defenders with them...There was nothing with which we could reply. Our regiments, although completely exhausted, were beating off one attack after another by bayonet ... Blood flowed unendingly, the ranks became thinner and thinner...The number of graves multiplied." On 5 August, with the Russian army in retreat, Warsaw fell. Defeat bred disorder at home. At first, the targets were German, and in June shops, bakeries, factories, private houses and country estates belonging to people with German names were looted and burned. The mobs then turned on the government, declaring the empress should be shut up in a convent, the tsar deposed and Rasputin hanged. An emergency session of the Duma was summoned and a Special Defense Council established, its members drawn from the Duma and the tsar's ministers.

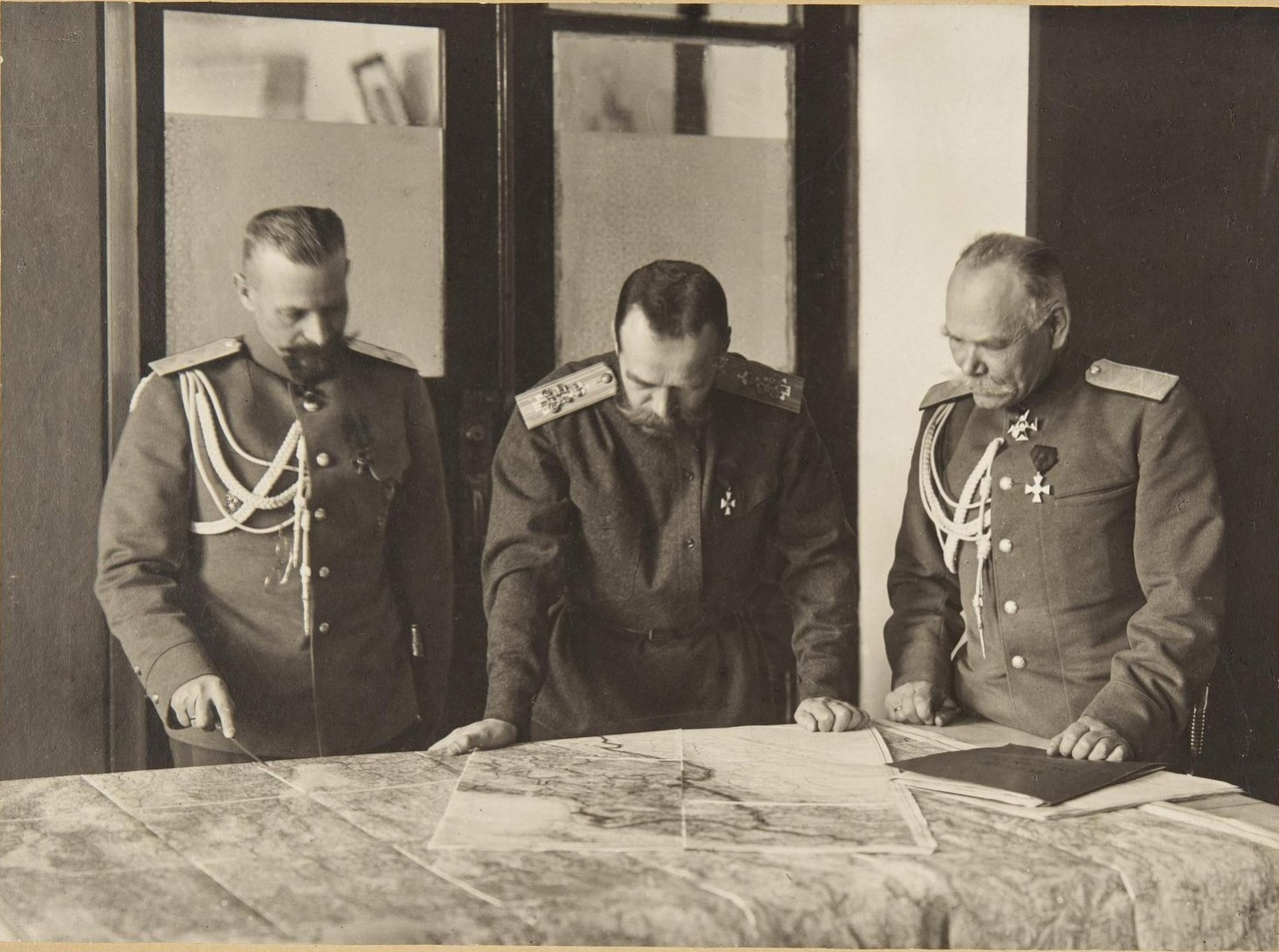
Supreme commander Nicholas II, chief of staff Alekseyev (right)

In July 1915, King Christian X of Denmark, first cousin of the tsar, sent Hans Niels Andersen to Tsarskoye Selo with an offer to act as a mediator. He made trips between London, Berlin and Petrograd and in July saw the Dowager Empress Maria Feodorovna. Andersen told her they should conclude peace. Nicholas turned down Christian's offer of mediation, as he felt it would be a betrayal for Russia to form a separate peace treaty with the Central Powers when its allies Britain and France were still fighting.

General Alexei Polivanov replaced Sukhomlinov as Minister of War, which failed to improve the situation. In the aftermath of the Great Retreat and loss of the Kingdom of Poland, Nicholas assumed the role of commander-in-chief after dismissing his cousin, Grand Duke Nicholas Nikolayevich, in September 1915. This was a mistake, as the tsar became personally associated with continuing losses at the front. He was away at the remote headquarters at Mogilev, far from direct governance of the empire, and when revolution broke out in Petrograd he was unable to halt it. In reality the move was symbolic, since important military decisions were made by his chief of staff, General Mikhail Alekseyev, and Nicholas did little more than review troops, inspect field hospitals, and preside over military luncheons.

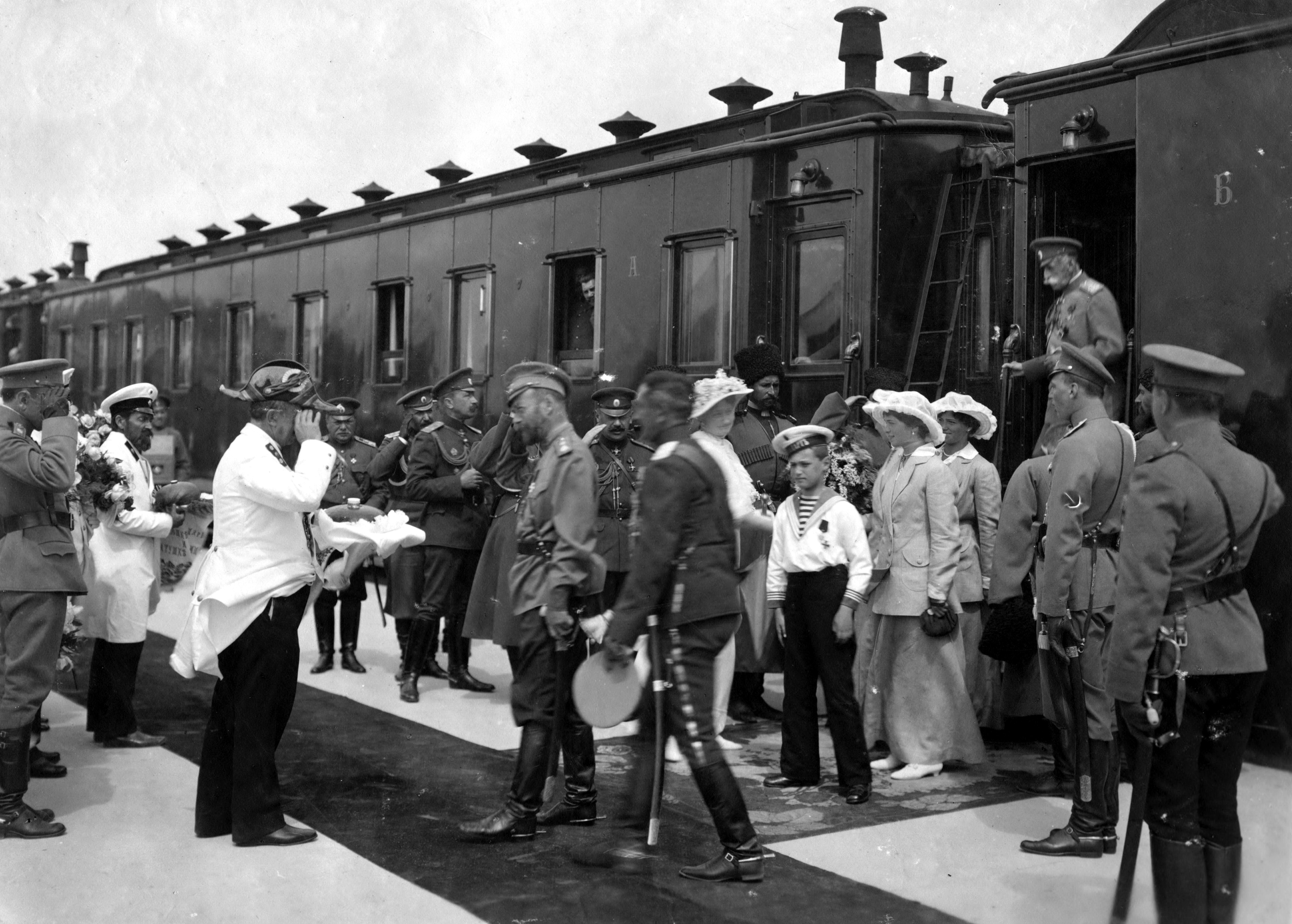
Nicholas II with his family in Yevpatoria, Crimea, May 1916

The Duma was still calling for political reforms, and unrest continued throughout the war. Cut off from public opinion, Nicholas could not see the dynasty was under threat. With Nicholas at the front, domestic issues and control of the capital were left with his wife. However, Alexandra's relationship with Rasputin, and her German background, discredited the dynasty's authority. Nicholas had been warned about the destructive public perception of Rasputin but failed to remove him. Rumors and accusations about Alexandra and Rasputin appeared; Alexandra was even accused of harboring treasonous sympathies towards Germany. Anger at Nicholas's failure to act, and Rasputin's perceived influence on the failing Russian war effort and on the monarchy, resulted in Rasputin's murder by nobles, led by Prince Felix Yusupov and Grand Duke Dmitri Pavlovich, a cousin of the tsar, on 17 December 1916 (O.S.) / 30 December 1916 (N.S.).

=== Collapse ===
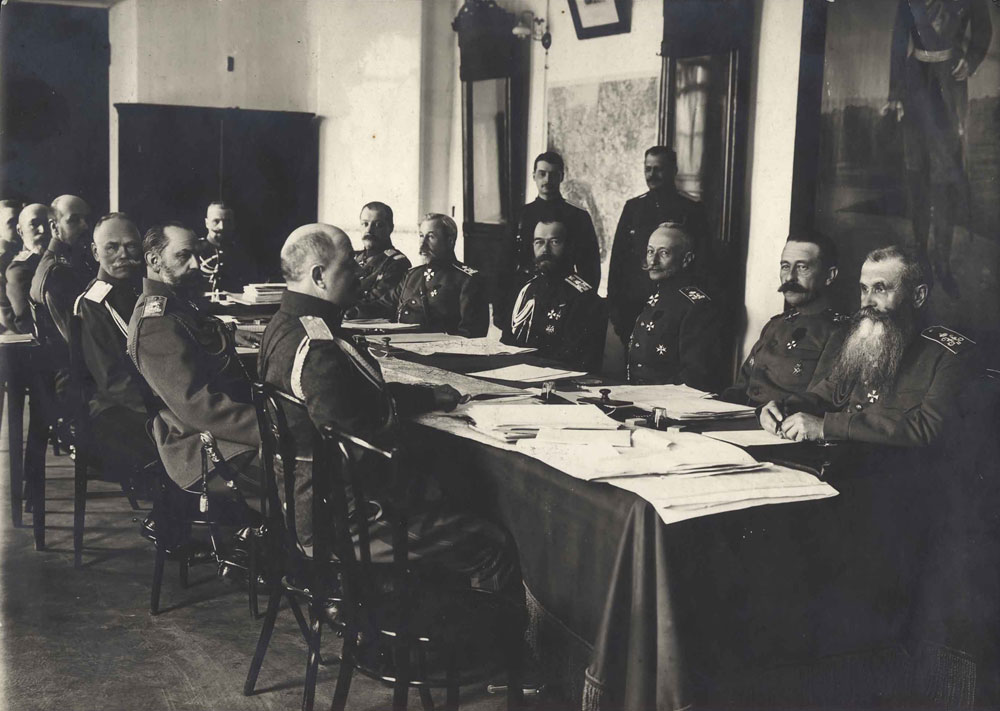
Nicholas with members of the Stavka at Mogilev in April 1916

As the government failed to produce supplies, mounting hardship resulted in massive riots and rebellions. With Nicholas away at the front from 1915 through 1916, authority appeared to collapse and the capital was left in the hands of strikers and mutineering soldiers. Despite efforts by the British Ambassador Sir George Buchanan to warn the Tsar that he should grant constitutional reforms to fend off revolution, Nicholas continued to bury himself away at the Staff Headquarters (Stavka) 600 kilometres (400 mi) away at Mogilev, leaving his capital and court open to intrigues and insurrection.

Ideologically the tsar's greatest support came from the right-wing monarchists, who had recently gained strength. However they were increasingly alienated by the tsar's support of Stolypin's Westernizing reforms taken early in the Revolution of 1905 and especially by the political power the tsar had bestowed on Rasputin.

By early 1917, Russia was on the verge of total collapse of morale. An estimated 1.7 million Russian soldiers were killed in World War I. The sense of failure and imminent disaster was everywhere. The army had taken 15 million men from the farms and food prices had soared. An egg cost four times what it had in 1914, butter five times as much. The severe winter dealt the railways, overburdened by emergency shipments of coal and supplies, a crippling blow.

Russia entered the war with 20,000 locomotives; by 1917, 9,000 were in service, while the number of serviceable railway wagons had dwindled from half a million to 170,000. In February 1917, 1,200 locomotives burst their boilers and nearly 60,000 wagons were immobilized. In Petrograd, supplies of flour and fuel had all but disappeared. War-time prohibition of alcohol was enacted by Nicholas to boost patriotism and productivity, but instead damaged the funding of the war, due to the treasury now being deprived of alcohol taxes.

On 23 February 1917 in Petrograd, a combination of very severe cold weather and acute food shortages caused people to break into shops and bakeries to get bread and other necessities. In the streets, red banners appeared and the crowds chanted "Down with the German woman! Down with Protopopov! Down with the war! Down with the Tsar!"

Police shot at the populace which incited riots. The troops in the capital were poorly motivated and their officers had no reason to be loyal to the regime, with the bulk of the tsar's loyalists away fighting World War I. In contrast, the soldiers in Petrograd were angry, full of revolutionary fervor and sided with the populace.

The tsar's Cabinet begged Nicholas to return to the capital and offered to resign completely. The tsar, 800 kilometres (500 mi) away, misinformed by the Minister of the Interior Alexander Protopopov that the situation was under control, ordered that firm steps be taken against the demonstrators. For this task, the Petrograd garrison was quite unsuitable. The cream of the old regular army had been destroyed in Poland and Galicia. In Petrograd, 170,000 recruits, country boys or older men from the working-class suburbs of the capital itself, were available under the command of officers at the front and cadets not yet graduated from the military academies. The units in the capital, although many bore the names of famous Imperial Guard regiments, were in reality rear or reserve battalions of these regiments, the regular units being away at the front. Many units, lacking both officers and rifles, had never undergone formal training.

General Khabalov attempted to put the tsar's instructions into effect on the morning of Sunday, 11 March 1917. Despite huge posters ordering people to keep off the streets, vast crowds gathered and were only dispersed after some 200 had been shot dead, though a company of the Volhynian Regiment fired into the air rather than into the mob, and a company of the Pavlovsky Life Guards shot the officer who gave the command to open fire. Nicholas, informed of the situation by Mikhail Rodzianko, ordered reinforcements to the capital and suspended the Duma. However, it was too late.

On 12 March, the Volhynian Regiment mutinied and was quickly followed by the Semenovsky, the Izmailovsky, the Lithuanian and even the legendary Preobrazhensky Regiment of the Imperial Guard, the oldest and staunchest regiment founded by Peter the Great. The arsenal was pillaged and the Ministry of the Interior, Military Government building, police headquarters, Law Courts and a score of police buildings were set on fire. By noon, the Peter and Paul Fortress, with its heavy artillery, was in the hands of the insurgents. By nightfall, 60,000 soldiers had joined the revolution.

Order broke down and Prime Minister Nikolai Golitsyn resigned; members of the Duma and the Soviet formed a Provisional Government to try to restore order. They issued a demand that Nicholas must abdicate. Faced with this demand, which was echoed by his generals, deprived of loyal troops, with his family firmly in the hands of the Provisional Government, and fearful of unleashing civil war and opening the way for German conquest, Nicholas had little choice but to submit.

== Revolution ==
=== Abdication ===
On these pivotal days on the road of the destiny of Russia it is our duty to do everything we can for the good of the people to gather our strength and to unite our ranks to achieve a quick victory. For this reason do we, Nicholas II, in understanding with the Duma of the state, see that is best to abdicate from the throne of Russia and to surrender the supreme power. As we are unwilling to part ways with our son do we surrender the hereditary right to the throne to the grand duke Mikhail Alexandrovich, and give him our blessing as he will rise onto the throne of the empire of Russia.

The losses of World War I and the fall of the economy, the workers going on strikes and the political agitation and rioting eventually led to the outbreak of the February Revolution in Saint Petersburg in March 1917. After the divisions and cossacks at the city garrison had sided with the revolution, emperor Nicholas II was left without a choice.

As Nicholas was returning on a train from the Mogilev Stavka on 15 March 1917 he got a telegram to Pskov from Mikhail Rodzianko, the head of the Duma and from Mikhail Alekseyev, the chief of staff, requiring him to abdicate in favour of his son Alexei. As Nicholas realised the seriousness of the situation he agreed that abdication would be the best solution for the Russia he loved and the continuation of the empire.

Nicholas had suffered a coronary occlusion only four days before his abdication. At the end of the "February Revolution", Nicholas II chose to abdicate on 2 March (O.S.) / 15 March (N.S.) 1917.

Nicholas first abdicated in favor of Alexei, but a few hours later changed his mind after advice from doctors that Alexei would not live long enough while separated from his parents, who would be forced into exile. Nicholas thus abdicated on behalf of his son, and drew up a new manifesto naming his brother, Grand Duke Michael, as the next Emperor of all the Russias. He issued a statement but it was suppressed by the Provisional Government.

Michael declined to accept the throne until the people were allowed to vote through a Constituent Assembly for the continuance of the monarchy or a republic. The abdication of Nicholas II and Michael's deferment of accepting the throne brought three centuries of the Romanov dynasty's rule to an end. The fall of Tsarist autocracy brought joy to liberals and socialists in Britain and France. The United States was the first foreign government to recognize the Provisional government. In Russia, the announcement of the tsar's abdication was greeted with many emotions, including delight, relief, fear, anger and confusion.

=== Possibility of exile ===
Both the Provisional Government and Nicholas wanted the royal family to go into exile following his abdication, with the United Kingdom being the preferred option. The British government reluctantly offered the family asylum on 19 March 1917, although it was suggested that it would be better for the Romanovs to go to a neutral country. News of the offer provoked uproar from the Labour Party and many Liberals, and the British ambassador, George Buchanan, advised the government that the extreme left would use the ex-tsar's presence "as an excuse for rousing public opinion against us". The Liberal Prime Minister, David Lloyd George, preferred that the family went to a neutral country, and wanted the offer to be announced as at the request of the Russian government. The offer of asylum was withdrawn in April following objections by King George V, who, acting on the advice of his secretary, Lord Stamfordham, was worried that Nicholas's presence might provoke an uprising like the previous year's Easter Rising in Ireland. However, later the king defied his secretary and went to the Romanov memorial service at the Russian Church in London. In the early summer of 1917, the Russian government approached the British government on the issue of asylum and was informed the offer had been withdrawn due to the considerations of British internal politics.

The French government declined to accept the Romanovs in view of increasing unrest on the Western Front and on the home front as a result of the ongoing war with Germany. The British ambassador in Paris, Francis Bertie, advised the Foreign Secretary that the Romanovs would be unwelcome in France as the ex-empress was regarded as pro-German.

Even if an offer of asylum had been forthcoming, there would have been other obstacles to be overcome. The Provisional Government only remained in power through an uneasy alliance with the Petrograd Soviet, an arrangement known as "The Dual power". An initial plan to send the imperial family to the northern port of Murmansk had to be abandoned when it was realised that the railway workers and the soldiers guarding them were loyal to the Petrograd Soviet, which opposed the escape of the tsar; a later proposal to send the Romanovs to a neutral port in the Baltic Sea via the Grand Duchy of Finland faced similar difficulties.

=== Imprisonment ===
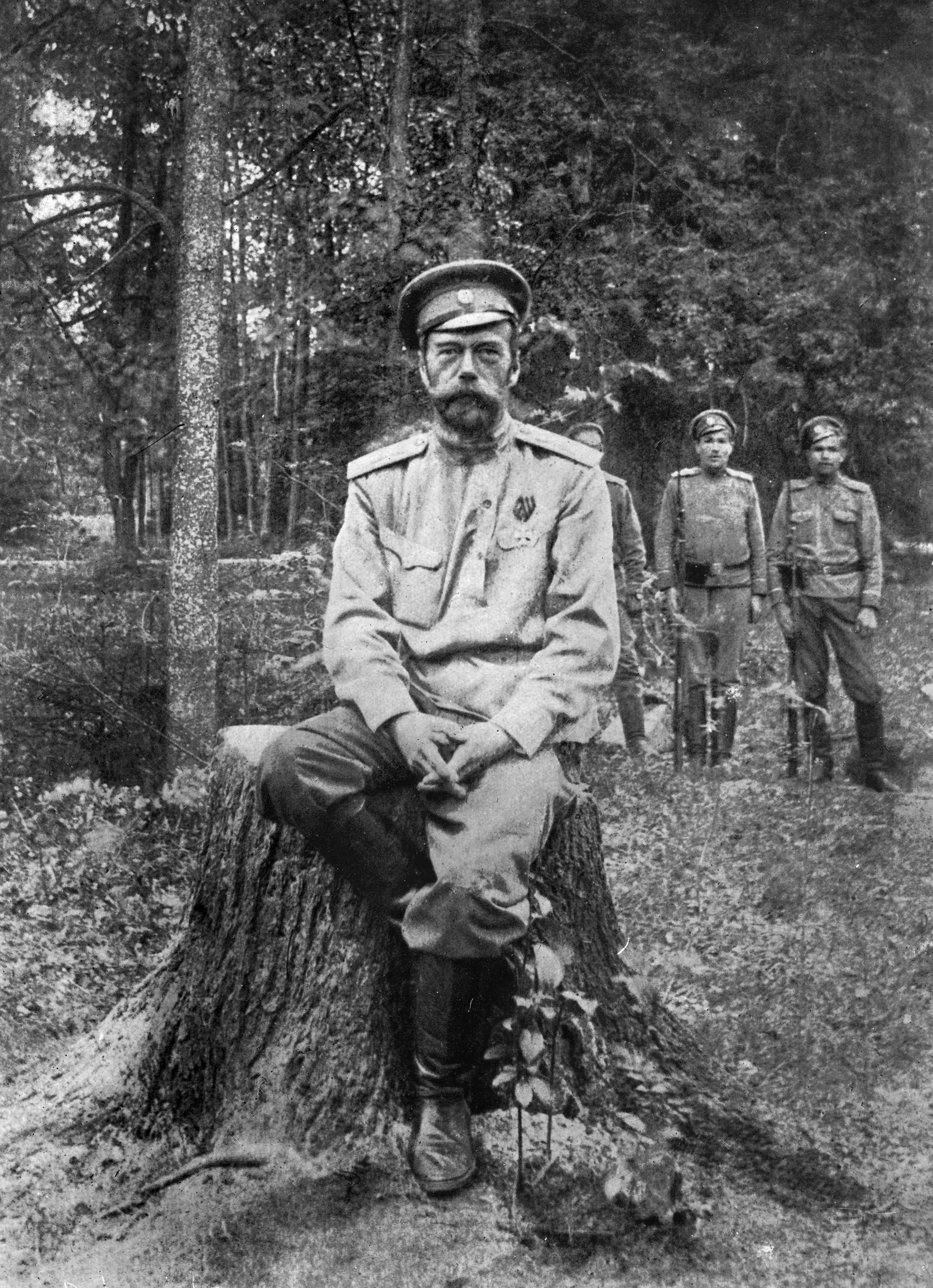
Nicholas II under guard in the grounds at Tsarskoye Selo in the summer of 1917

==== Tsarskoye Selo ====
After the abdication of Nicholas II, the Russian Provisional Government protected the imperial family. On 20 March 1917, the Provisional Government decreed that the imperial family should be held under house arrest in the Alexander Palace at Tsarskoye Selo. Nicholas joined the rest of the family there two days later, having traveled from the wartime headquarters at Mogilev. The family had total privacy inside the palace and they could do gardening while the guards were present, but walks in the grounds were strictly regulated and they could not leave the area.

Members of their domestic staff were allowed to stay if they wished and culinary standards were maintained. Colonel Eugene Kobylinsky was appointed to command the military garrison at Tsarskoye Selo, which increasingly had to be done through negotiation with the committees or soviets elected by the soldiers. During his imprisonment Nicholas read The Protocols of the Elders of Zion to his family. During this period, a series of initiatives were undertaken to rescue Nicholas and his family from Russia, but none proved successful.

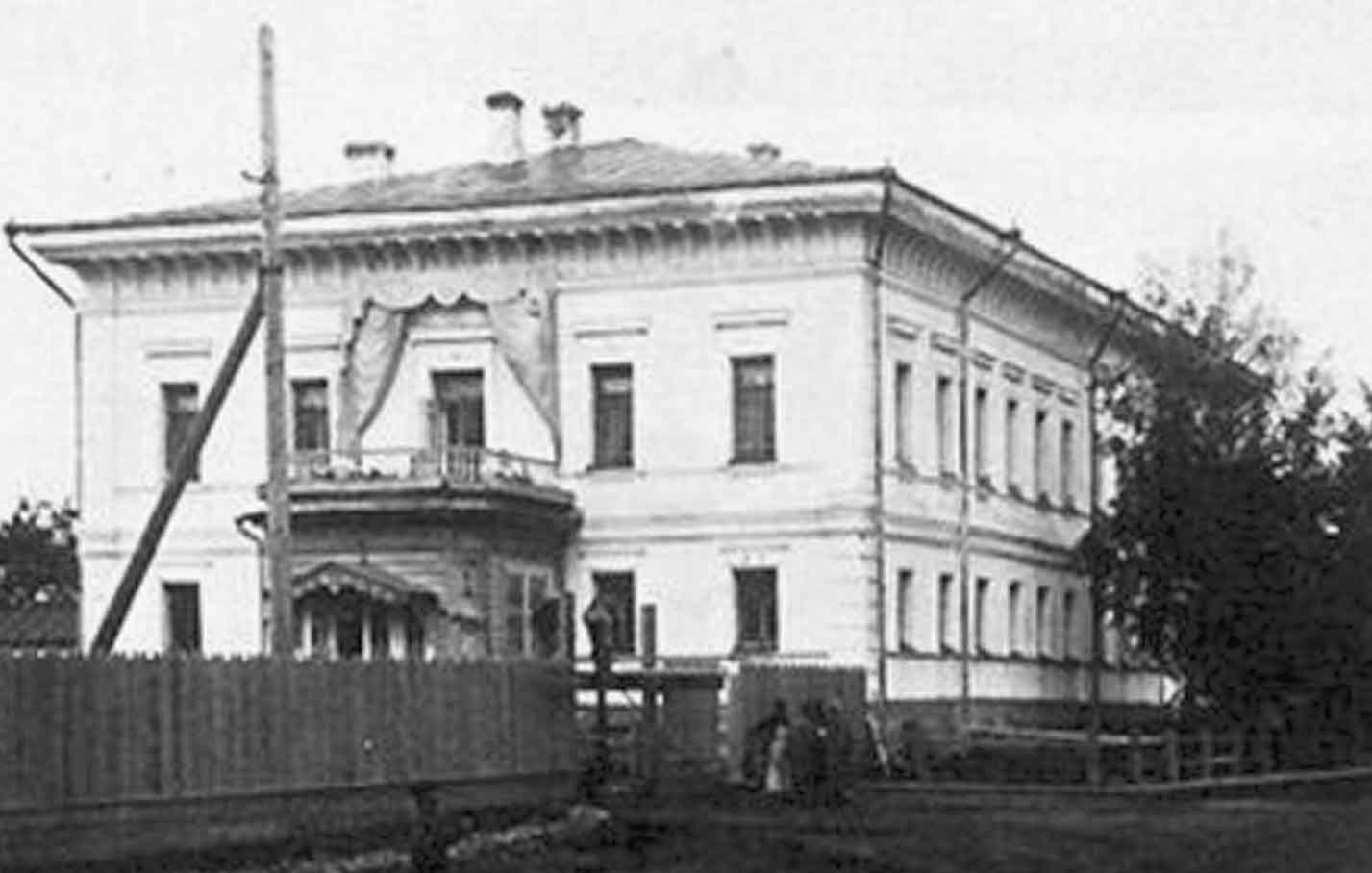
The Governor's Mansion in Tobolsk, where the Romanov family was held in captivity between August 1917 and April 1918

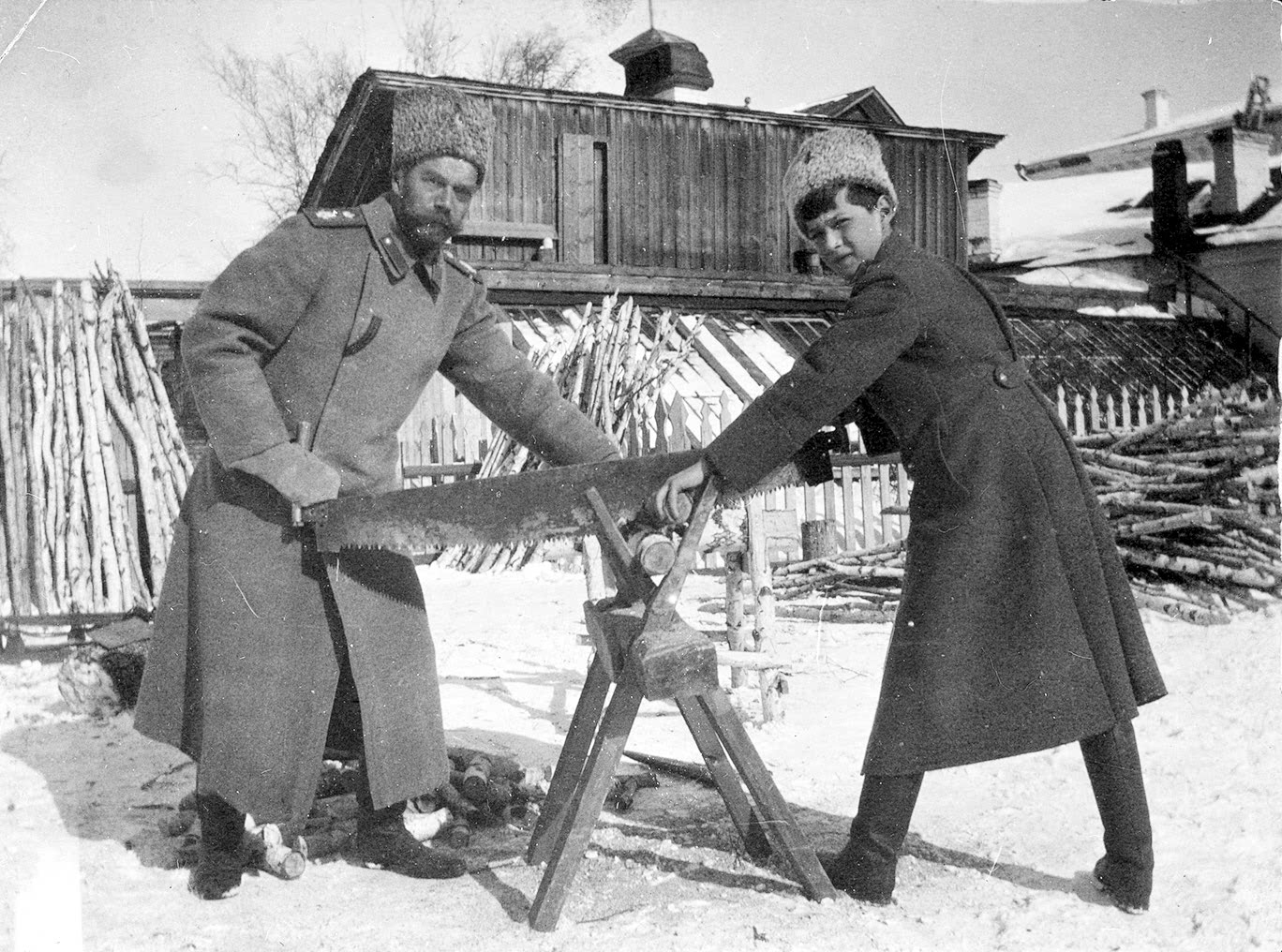
Nicholas and Alexei sawing wood at Tobolsk in late 1917; a favourite pastime

==== Tobolsk ====
That summer, the failure of the Kerensky Offensive against Austro-Hungarian and German forces in Galicia led to anti-government rioting in Petrograd, known as the July Days. The government feared that further disturbances in the city could easily reach Tsarskoye Selo and it was decided to move the imperial family to a safer location. Alexander Kerensky, who had taken over as prime minister, selected the town of Tobolsk in Western Siberia, since it was remote from any large city and 150 miles (240 km) from the nearest rail station. Some sources state that there was an intention to send the family abroad in the spring of 1918 via Japan, but more recent work suggests that this was just a Bolshevik rumour. The family left the Alexander Palace late on 13 August, reached Tyumen by rail four days later and then by two river ferries finally reached Tobolsk on 19 August. There they lived in the former Governor's Mansion in considerable comfort. The family were even allowed to walk to church on Sundays.

In October 1917, however, the Bolsheviks seized power from Kerensky's Provisional Government; Nicholas followed the events in October with interest but not yet with alarm. Boris Soloviev, the husband of Maria Rasputin, attempted to organize a rescue with monarchical factions, but it came to nothing. Rumors persist that Soloviev was working for the Bolsheviks or the Germans, or both. Separate preparations for a rescue by Nikolai Yevgenyevich Markov were frustrated by Soloviev's ineffectual activities. Nicholas continued to underestimate Lenin's importance. In the meantime he and his family occupied themselves with reading books, exercising and playing games; Nicholas particularly enjoyed chopping firewood. However, in January 1918, the guard detachment's committee grew more assertive, restricting the hours that the family could spend in the grounds and banning them from walking to church on a Sunday as they had done since October. In a later incident, the soldiers tore the epaulettes from Kobylinsky's uniform, and he asked Nicholas not to wear his uniform outside for fear of provoking a similar event.

In February 1918, the Council of People's Commissars (abbreviated to "Sovnarkom") in Moscow, the new capital, announced that the state subsidy for the family would be drastically reduced, starting on 1 March. This meant parting with twelve devoted servants and giving up butter and coffee as luxuries, even though Nicholas added to the funds from his own resources. Walks outside the house were also limited.

Nicholas and Alexandra were appalled by news of the Treaty of Brest-Litovsk, whereby Russia agreed to give up Poland, Finland, the Baltic States, most of Belarus, Ukraine, the Crimea, most of the Caucasus, and small parts of Russia proper including areas around Pskov and Rostov-on-Don. What kept the family's spirits up was the belief that help was at hand. The Romanovs believed that various plots were underway to break them out of captivity and smuggle them to safety. The Western Allies lost interest in the fate of the Romanovs after Russia left the war. The German government wanted the monarchy restored in Russia to crush the Bolsheviks and maintain good relations with the Central Powers.

The situation in Tobolsk changed for the worse on 26 March, when 250 ill-disciplined Red Guards arrived from the regional capital, Omsk. Not to be outdone, the soviet in Yekaterinburg, the capital of the neighbouring Ural region, sent 400 Red Guards to exert their influence on the town. Disturbances between these rival groups and the lack of funds to pay the guard detachment caused them to send a delegation to Moscow to plead their case. The result was that Sovnarkom appointed their own commissar to take charge of Tobolsk and remove the Romanovs to Yekaterinburg, with the intention of eventually bringing Nicholas to a show trial in Moscow. The man selected was Vasily Yakovlev, a veteran Bolshevik. Recruiting a body of loyal men en route, Yakovlev arrived in Tobolsk on 22 April; he imposed his authority on the competing Red Guards factions, paid-off and demobilized the guard detachment, and placed further restrictions on the Romanovs. The next day, Yakovlev informed Kobylinsky that Nicholas was to be transferred to Yekaterinburg. Alexei was too ill to travel, so Alexandra elected to go with Nicholas along with Maria, while the other daughters would remain at Tobolsk until they were able to make the journey.

In Tobolsk the family sewed jewels onto their corsets, undershirts, belts and hats. The buttons on their summer outfits were replaced with diamonds and jewels were sewn into Alexei's undergarments and the hat of his uniform. The diamond-studded undergarments of three of the girls weighed two kilograms in total.

After Alexei had recovered he and the rest of the family were also taken to Yekaterinburg on steam ship and train in late May 1918. During the journey drunken guards harassed the girls. The ladies-in-waiting, Alexei's Swiss home teacher Pierre Gilliard and teacher Charles Sidney Gibbes, as well as the rest of the entourage, were left at the station platform and told they were free to go.

==== Yekaterinburg ====
At 3 am on 25 April, the three Romanovs, their retinue, and the escort of Yakovlev's detachment, left Tobolsk in a convoy of nineteen tarantasses (four-wheeled carriages), as the river was still partly frozen which prevented the use of the ferry. After an arduous journey which included two overnight stops, fording rivers, frequent changes of horses and a foiled plot by the Yekaterinburg Red Guards to abduct and kill the prisoners, the party arrived at Tyumen and boarded a requisitioned train. Yakovlev was able to communicate securely with Moscow by means of a Hughes' teleprinter and obtained agreement to change their destination to Omsk, where it was thought that the leadership were less likely to harm the Romanovs. Leaving Tyumen early on 28 April, the train left towards Yekaterinburg, but quickly changed direction towards Omsk. This led the Yekaterinburg leaders to believe that Yakovlev was a traitor who was trying to take Nicholas to exile by way of Vladivostok; telegraph messages were sent, two thousand armed men were mobilized and a train was dispatched to arrest Yakovlev and the Romanovs. The Romanovs' train was halted at Omsk station and after a frantic exchange of cables with Moscow, it was agreed that they should go to Yekaterinburg in return for a guarantee of safety for the imperial family; they finally arrived there on the morning of 30 April.

They were imprisoned in the two-story Ipatiev House, the home of the military engineer Nikolay Nikolayevich Ipatiev, which ominously became referred to as the "house of special purpose". Here the Romanovs were kept under even stricter conditions; they were only allowed to speak Russian, their cameras were confiscated, their belongings were inspected and taken to locked storage and their retinue was further reduced. The windows were painted shut, visits outside were limited and the house was surrounded with a tall fence. The family was not allowed to go to church or receive guests, and also forbidden from reading newspapers or writing letters. Food portions were limited.

As time passed, the guards became more sympathetic towards the prisoners, after which the Bolshevik government replaced the guards with new ones. The new guards were members of the notorious Cheka secret police. Six of them were Bulgarian and Hungarian prisoners-of-war, who were used for the dirty work. According to Robert K. Massie the imperial family knew their fate when these men arrived. The cold, professional behaviour of the guards plainly showed them to be executioners.

Following allegations of pilfering from the royal household, Yakov Yurovsky, a former member of the Cheka secret police, was appointed to command the guard detachment, a number of whom were replaced with trusted Latvian members of the Yekaterinburg "special-service detachment". The remaining Romanovs left Tobolsk by river steamer on 20 May and arrived in Yekaterinburg three days later. By the first weeks of June, the Bolsheviks were becoming alarmed by the Revolt of the Czechoslovak Legion, whose forces were approaching the city from the east. This prompted a wave of executions and murders of those in the region who were believed to be counter-revolutionaries, including Grand Duke Michael, who was murdered in Perm on 13 June.

Although the Bolshevik leadership in Moscow still intended to bring Nicholas to trial, as the military situation deteriorated, Leon Trotsky and Yakov Sverdlov began to publicly equivocate about the possible fate of the former tsar. On 16 July, the Yekaterinburg leadership informed Yurovsky that it had been decided to murder the Romanovs as soon as approval arrived from Moscow, because the Czechs were expected to reach the city imminently. A coded telegram arrived in Moscow from Yekaterinburg that evening; after Lenin and Sverdlov had conferred a reply was sent, although no trace of that document has ever been found. In the meantime, Yurovsky had organized his firing squad and they waited through the night at the Ipatiev House for the signal to act.

=== Execution ===
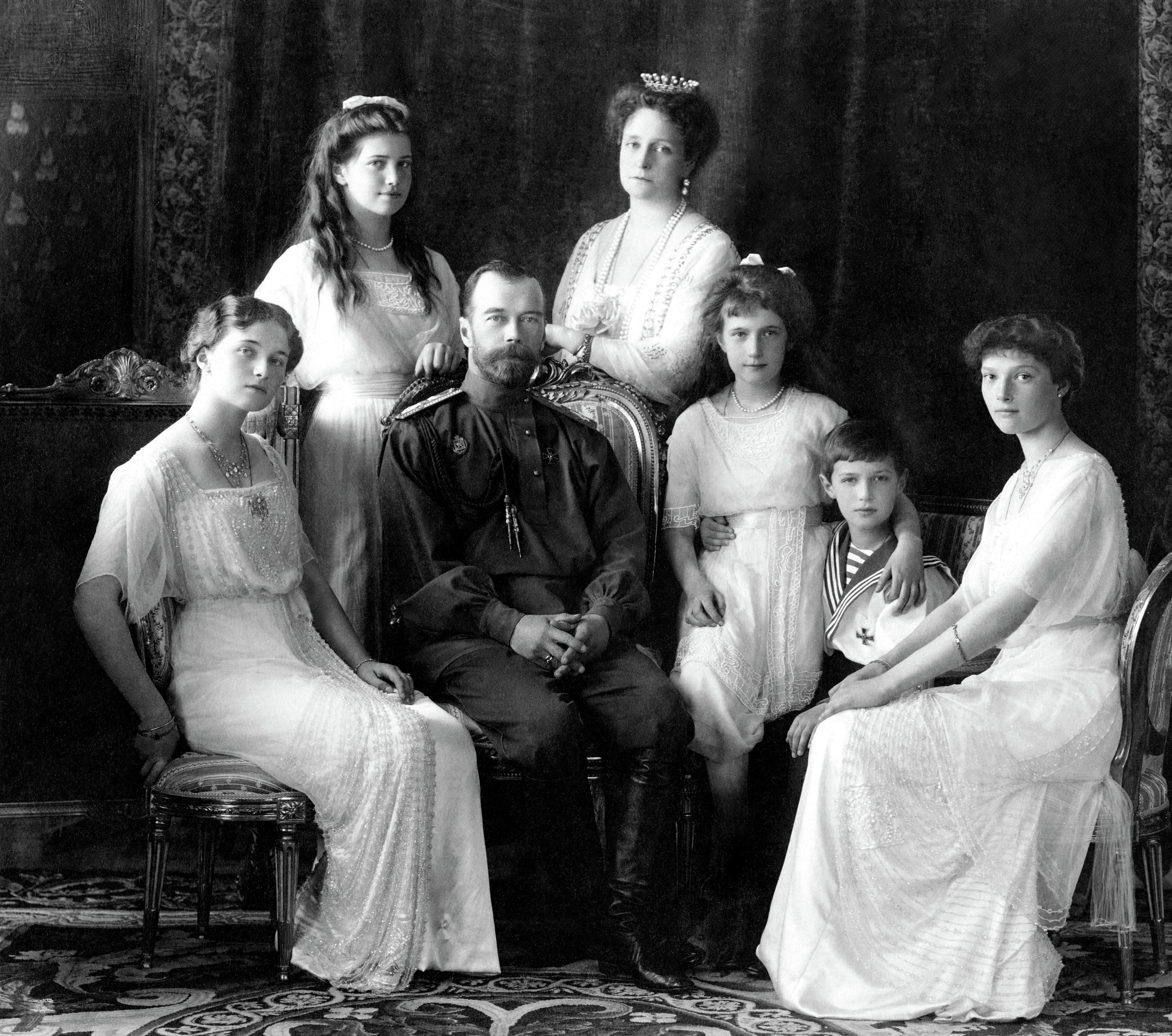
Nicholas with his family (left to right): Olga, Maria, Nicholas II, Alexandra Fyodorovna, Anastasia, Alexei, and Tatiana. Livadia Palace, 1913.

There are several accounts of what happened and historians have not agreed on a solid, confirmed scope of events. According to the account of Bolshevik officer Yakov Yurovsky (the chief executioner), in the early hours of 17 July 1918, the royal family was awakened around 2:00 am, got dressed, and were led down into a half-basement room at the back of the Ipatiev house. The pretext for this move was the family's safety, i.e. that anti-Bolshevik forces were approaching Yekaterinburg, and the house might be fired upon. The prisoners were told that Moscow wanted a photograph of them as proof of their wellbeing. They were assembled, but instead of a photographer, a group of armed guards arrived.

Present with Nicholas, Alexandra and their children were their doctor and three of their servants, who had voluntarily chosen to remain with the family: the Tsar's personal physician Eugene Botkin, his wife's maid Anna Demidova, and the family's chef, Ivan Kharitonov, and footman, Alexei Trupp. A firing squad had been assembled and was waiting in an adjoining room, composed of seven Communist soldiers from Central Europe, and three local Bolsheviks, all under the command of Yurovsky. The executioners had agreed beforehand who would shoot whom - Nicholas II belonged to Peter Ermakov and the empress Alexandra belonged to Yurovsky.

Nicholas was carrying his son. When the family arrived in the basement, the former tsar asked if chairs could be brought in for his wife and son to sit on. Yurovsky ordered two chairs brought in, and when the empress and the heir were seated, the executioners filed into the room. Yurovsky announced to them that the Ural Soviet of Workers' Deputies had decided to murder them. A stunned Nicholas asked, "What? What did you say?" and turned toward his family. Yurovsky quickly repeated the order and Nicholas said, according to Peter Ermakov, "You know not what you do."

The executioners drew handguns and began shooting; Nicholas was the first to die. Yurovsky took credit afterwards for firing the first shot that killed the tsar, but his protege—Grigory Nikulin—said years later that Mikhail Medvedev had fired the shot that killed Nicholas. "He fired the first shot. He killed the Tsar," he said in 1964 in a tape-recorded statement for the radio. Nicholas was shot several times in the chest (sometimes erroneously said to have been shot in his head, but his skull bore no bullet wounds when it was discovered in 1991). Anastasia, Tatiana, Olga, and Maria survived the first hail of bullets; the sisters were wearing over 1.3 kilograms of diamonds and precious gems sewn into their clothing, which provided some initial protection from the bullets and bayonets. They were then stabbed with bayonets and finally shot at close range in their heads.

An announcement from the Presidium of the Ural Regional Soviet of the Workers' and Peasants' Government emphasized that conspiracies had been exposed to free the ex-tsar, that counter-revolutionary forces were pressing in on Soviet Russian territory, and that the ex-tsar was guilty of unforgivable crimes against the nation.

In view of the enemy's proximity to Yekaterinburg and the exposure by the Cheka of a serious White Guard plot with the goal of abducting the former tsar and his family… In light of the approach of counterrevolutionary bands toward the Red capital of the Urals and the possibility of the crowned executioner escaping trial by the people (a plot among the White Guards to try to abduct him and his family was exposed and the compromising documents will be published), the Presidium of the Ural Regional Soviet, fulfilling the will of the Revolution, resolved to shoot the former Tsar, Nikolai Romanov, who is guilty of countless, bloody, violent acts against the Russian people.

Commissar Peter Ermakov claimed to have been the chief of the guards at the Ipatiev House. Ermakov's description about the execution and disposal of the bodies is completely different from that of captain Yurovsky. Ermakov claimed to have burned the bodies at the Four brothers mining area on top of a pile of logs so thoroughly that not even a piece of a fingernail would have remained. Ermakov also claimed to have thrown the ashes from on top of a truck bed into a storm wind so that they would be scattered onto the fields and into the forest. Moscow announced only that Nicholas had been executed and the family had been evacuated to a safe place. After that, Moscow denied knowing anything about the whereabouts of the family for eight years.

The bodies were driven on a truck to nearby woodland, searched and burned. The remains were soaked in acid and finally thrown down a disused mine shaft. Attempts at collapsing the mine shaft with explosives failed, and so the naked bodies were dug back up on the following night and buried along the forest road on the place where the car sank at the "Meadow of pigs". The bodies were only found in 1978.

On the following day, other members of the Romanov family including Grand Duchess Elizabeth Feodorovna, the empress's sister, who were being held in a school at Alapayevsk, were taken to another mine shaft and thrown in alive, except for Grand Duke Sergei Mikhailovich who was shot when he tried to resist.

In 1977 Boris Yeltsin, the first secretary of the Sverlovsk communist party had the Ipatiev House demolished with bulldozers on orders from the politburo, as Soviet leaders feared the place would turn into a memorial site for people supporting imperial rule. Yuri Andropov, the leader of the KGB had suggested demolishing the house because otherwise it could become "a target of severe attention - in the counter-Soviet circles in the west". In 2000 a church called the Church on Blood was built on the site. It is one of the largest churches in Russia and the icon inside it is one of the most expensive in the world. The church building has two separate church halls of which the lower hall has been sanctified to the imperial family.

=== Identification ===
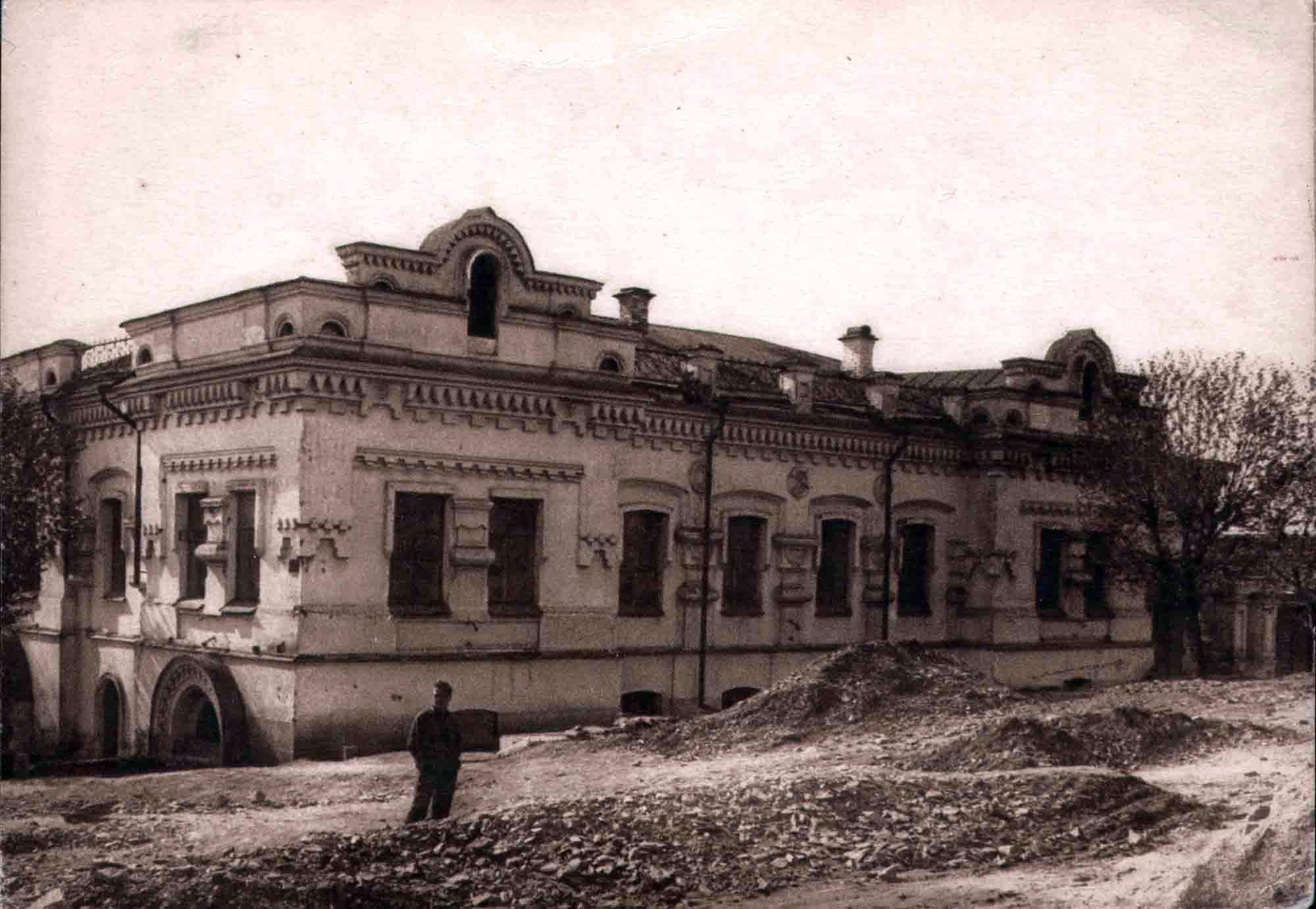
The Ipatiev House, Yekaterinburg, (later Sverdlovsk) in 1928

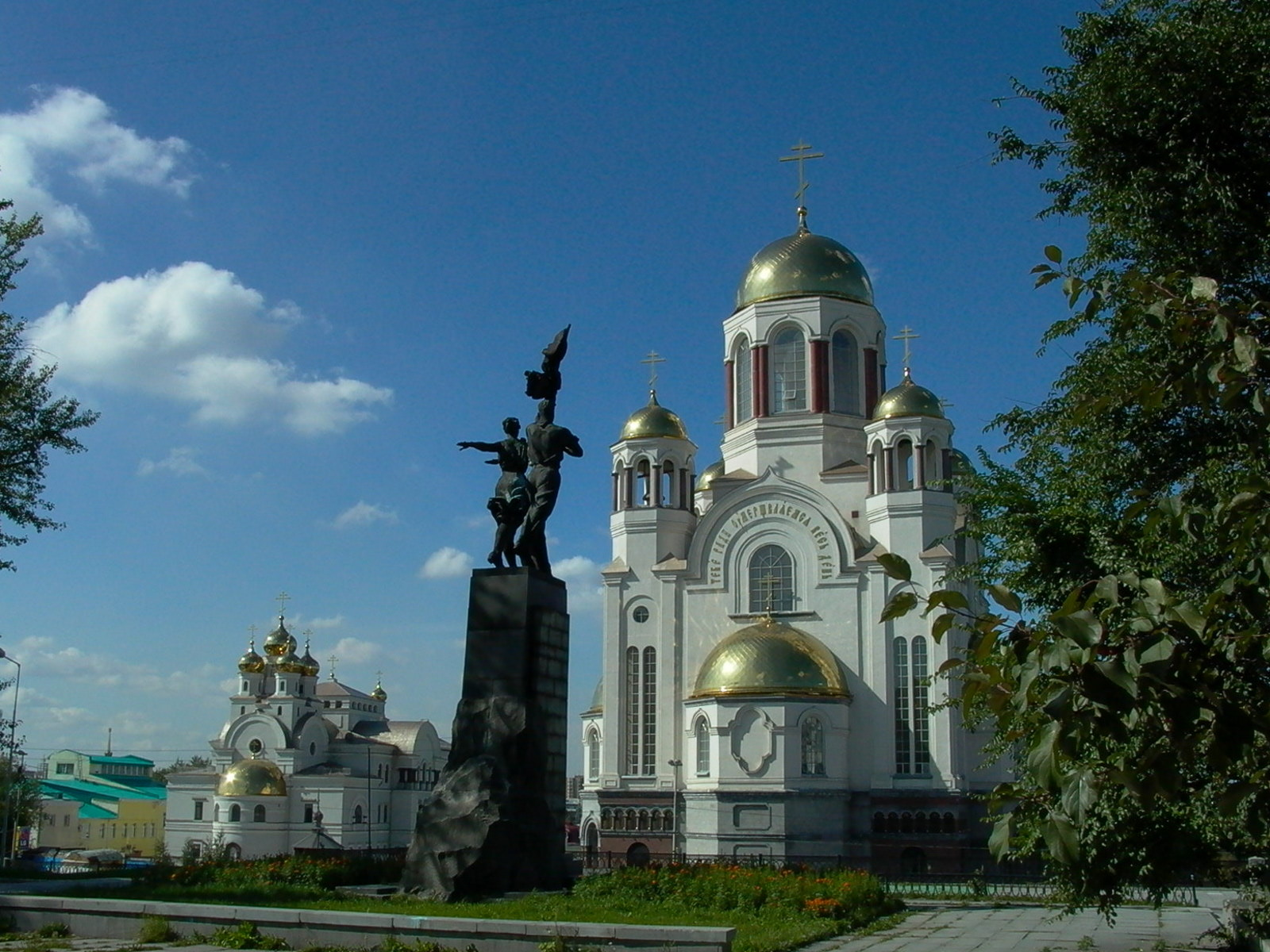
Yekaterinburg's "Church on the Blood", built on the spot where the Ipatiev House once stood

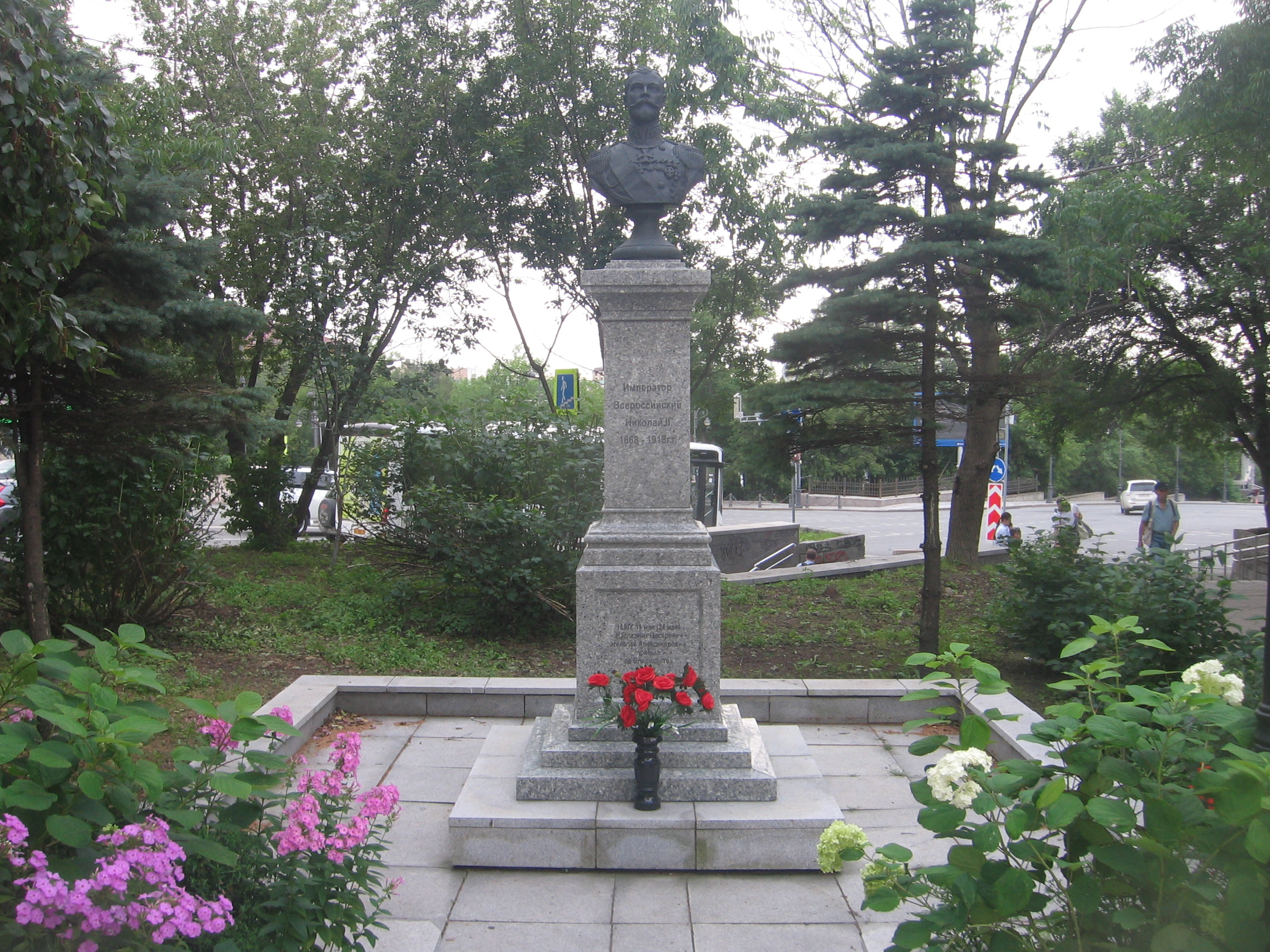
Statue of Nicholas II at Pokrovskiy Park, Vladivostok, Russia.

In 1979, the bodies of Tsar Nicholas II, Tsarina Alexandra, three of their daughters, and those of four non-family members killed with them, were discovered near Sverdlovsk (Yekaterinburg) by amateur archaeologist Alexander Avdonin. Director Geli Ryabov from Moscow received a report written by Yurovsky about the burial place of the bodies from Yurovsky's son, vice admiral Alexander Yurovsky. The report included a detailed specification of the burial site at the Meadow of pigs in Koptyak. This burial site was discovered by Ryabov and Avdonin in 1978.

In his report, Yurovsky mentions having burned the bodies of the lady-in-waiting Anna Demidova and tsarevich Alexei near the gravesite. According to experts, it is not possible to burn a body in a forest in a little less than five hours, which was the time Yurovsky had available to burn the bodies. For this reason, searching for the bodies continued. The Americans also tried to search for the two missing bodies in the 1990s by using a device utilising sound waves, but did not find them, as the ground had been too badly stirred.

In 1989, Ryabov published the location of the secret gravesite of the Romanov family in the magazine Rodina (Russian for "Homeland"). By suggestion from Avdonin, Ryabov actually published a location almost a kilometre away from the real gravesite. One day before the issue of Rodina was published in Sverdlovsk, heavy machinery vehicles appeared in the forest, starting to dig in the ground at the false location Ryabov had announced and transported all loose ground away. "KGB", said Avdonin.

In 1989 Ryabov tried to contact president Mikhail Gorbachev to ask for help at a government level, so the issue could be handled in a proper matter. Gorbachev did not reply. With Gorbachev's inaction, Ryabov decided to give an interview to the liberal magazine Moskovskiye Novost, published on 10 April 1989. The next day, many notable western newspapers announced that in 1979, the Soviet direct Geli Ryabov had found the bones of the imperial family in a swamp near Sverdlovsk.

Ryabov also wrote to Queen Elizabeth II of the United Kingdom, who was related to the Romanovs both directly and through her husband Prince Philip, asking her to use her influence so the imperial family could be buried in a Christian way. The queen did not reply.

The nine bodies in the grave were dug up in July 1991 with permission from president Boris Yeltsin and identified with DNA tests two years later. During the third day of the opening of the grave a dramatic fact became apparent - the grave was missing the skeletons of Alexei and one woman.

In January 1998, the remains excavated from underneath the dirt road near Yekaterinburg were officially identified as those of Nicholas II and his family, excluding one daughter (either Maria or Anastasia) and Alexei. The identifications—including comparisons to a living relative, performed by separate Russian, British and American scientists using DNA analysis—concur and were found to be conclusive.

In July 2007, the amateur historian Sergei Plotnikov discovered bones near Yekaterinburg belonging to a boy and young woman, located about 70 metres from where the rest of the family had been buried. The remains included 7 teeth and 44 pieces of bone, ranging from a few millimetres to a few centimetres in size. Three teeth with silver-amalgam fillings and 29 pieces of bone were thought to have belonged to Alexei. The remains were confirmed to have belonged to the imperial family with three DNA tests, whose samples were taken from the remains of Nicholas, Alexandra, Alix's sister Elisabeth Feodorovna, Alexander II and Alexander III. In addition to the DNA tests, Alexei's almost completely burned corpse and the high-quality silver-amalgam fillings in the remaining teeth, which were similar to the fillings of the rest of the family, were used as circumstantial evidence.

Prosecutors reopened the investigation into the deaths of the imperial family and, in April 2008, DNA tests performed by an American laboratory proved that bone fragments exhumed in the Ural Mountains belonged to two children of Nicholas II, Alexei and a daughter. That same day it was announced by Russian authorities that remains from the entire family had been recovered.

On 1 October 2008, the Supreme Court of Russia ruled that Nicholas II and his family were victims of political persecution and should be rehabilitated. In March 2009, results of the DNA testing were published, confirming that the two bodies discovered in 2007 were those of Alexei and one of his sisters.

According to Finnish diplomat and historian Max Jakobson, the director of the Soviet institute for military history, general Dmitri Volkogonov (1928 - 1995) has proven in his biography about Vladimir Lenin that emperor Nicholas II and his family were murdered by a decision of Lenin and his closest men in Moscow. In the 2000s an official investigation was conducted in Russia trying to find out whether Vladimir Lenin and Yakov Sverdlov had been guilty of giving the order to execute the Romanov family. The investigation found no trustworthy evidence that either Lenin or Sverdlov would have given the order. The investigation was stopped in early 2011.

In late 2015, at the insistence of the Russian Orthodox Church, Russian investigators exhumed the bodies of Nicholas II and his wife, Alexandra, for additional DNA testing, which confirmed that the bones were of the couple.

=== Funeral ===
After the DNA testing of 1998, the remains of the tsar and his immediate family were interred at St. Peter and Paul Cathedral, Saint Petersburg, on 17 July 1998, on the eightieth anniversary of their assassination. The ceremony was attended by Russian president Boris Yeltsin, who gave a speech at the funeral where he said, "Today is a historic day for Russia. For many years, we kept quiet about this monstrous crime, but the truth has to be spoken."

The British Royal Family was represented at the funeral by Prince Michael of Kent, and more than twenty ambassadors to Russia, including Sir Andrew Wood, Archbishop John Bukovsky, and Ernst-Jörg von Studnitz, were also in attendance.

== Sainthood ==
Saint Nicholas II of Russia
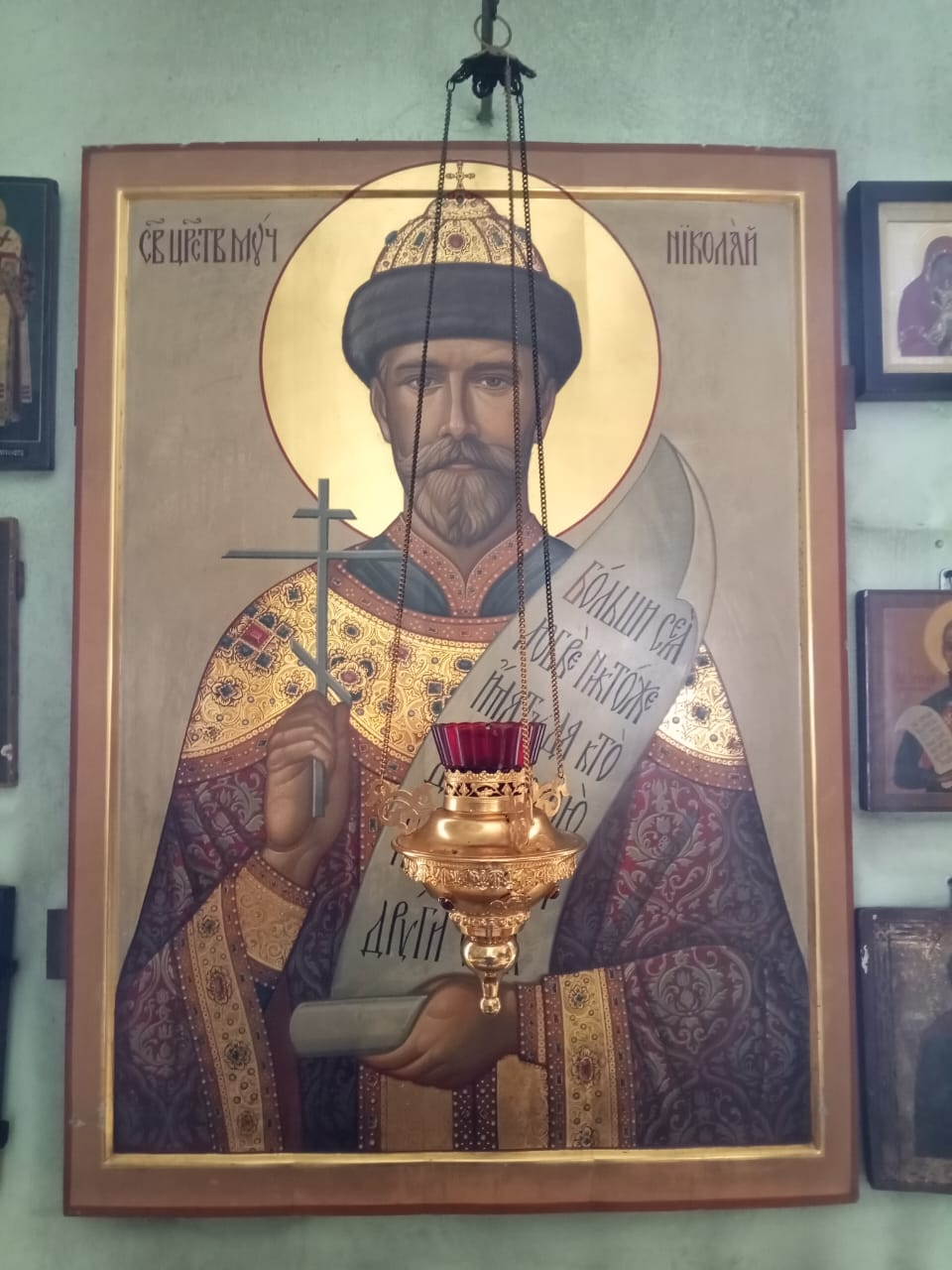

Tsar, Passion-Bearer (Note: Title used for Romanov Saints by Moscow Patriarchate) or Martyr (Note: Title used for Romanov Saints by ROCOR)
- Venerated in: Eastern Orthodox Church
- Canonized: 1981 by Russian Orthodox Church Abroad; 2000 by the Russian Orthodox Church
- Major shrine: Church on Blood, Yekaterinburg, Russia
- Feast: 17 July

In 1981, Nicholas and his immediate family were recognised as martyred saints by the Russian Orthodox Church Outside of Russia. On 14 August 2000, they were recognised by the synod of the Russian Orthodox Church. This time they were not named as martyrs, since their deaths did not result immediately from their Christian faith; instead, they were canonized as passion bearers. According to a statement by the Moscow synod, they were glorified as saints for the following reasons:

In the last Orthodox Russian monarch and members of his family we see people who sincerely strove to incarnate in their lives the commands of the Gospel. In the suffering borne by the Royal Family in prison with humility, patience, and meekness, and in their martyrs' deaths in Yekaterinburg in the night of 17 July 1918 was revealed the light of the faith of Christ that conquers evil.

However, Nicholas' canonization was controversial. The Russian Orthodox Church Abroad was split on the issue back in 1981, some members suggesting that the emperor was a weak ruler and had failed to thwart the rise of the Bolsheviks. It was pointed out by one priest that martyrdom in the Russian Orthodox Church has nothing to do with the martyr's personal actions but is instead related to why he or she was killed.

The Russian Orthodox Church inside Russia rejected the family's classification as martyrs because they were not killed on account of their religious faith. Religious leaders in both churches also had objections to canonising the tsar's family because they perceived him as a weak emperor whose incompetence led to the revolution and the suffering of his people and made him partially responsible for his own assassination and those of his wife, children and servants. For these opponents, the fact that the tsar was, in private life, a kind man and a good husband and father or a leader who showed genuine concern for the peasantry did not override his poor governance of Russia.

The Russian Orthodox Church does not recognise the remains that were found in 1991 and identified with DNA tests in the west as belonging to the imperial family or their servants. The Orthodox Church stands by Peter Ermakov's 1930 account that the bodies were burned and the traces of the crime went away in smoke. In 2004 the Japanese Tatsuo Nagani argued that the bones found in 1991 do not belong to the Romanov family or their servants. The Finnish professor and forensic dentist Helena Ranta has studied the teeth of the skull claimed to have belonged to Nicholas. In 1995 Ranta assumed that the skull did not belong to Nicholas. Ranta demanded a DNA test to be made of the skull but the Russians declined this. The Orthodox Church of Russia wanted to exhume the bodies that had already been buried so it could be confirmed whether they really were Nicholas II, Alexandra, Olga, Tatiana and Anastasia.

Despite the original opposition, the Russian Orthodox Church inside Russia ultimately recognised the family as "passion bearers", (Note: Russian: Святой страстотерпец Николай, romanized: Svyatoy strastoterpets Nikolay, IPA: [svʲɪˈtoj strəstɐˈtʲerpʲɪts nʲɪkɐˈlaj]; also called Saint Nicholas II of Russia) or people who met their deaths with Christian humility. Since the late 20th century, believers have attributed healing from illnesses or conversion to the Orthodox Church to their prayers to the children of Nicholas, Maria and Alexei, as well as to the rest of the family.

There exist two types of icons of the imperial family. In one type they are dressed in Medieval clothes, in the other they are dressed in clothes they wore in the early 20th century. In the Medieval-type icons Nicholas wears a fur-lined crown of Vladimir II Monomakh and the coronation clothes of the era of the first Romanovs. In reality, Nicholas never wore the tsar's crown, as it had fallen out of use already at the time of Peter the Great. According to Robert K. Massie, Nicholas would have wanted to take the crown back to use, but the court protocol did not allow it.

The Karlovc synod, which possesses the Nikolai Sokolov investigation committee's material and findings, such as jewellery, buttons, pieces of clothing and badges, the severed finger of the empress and the collar of Anastasia's pet Spaniel Jimmy, canonised the members of the imperial family already in 1960.

== Legacy ==
Contemporary evaluations of Nicholas portrayed him as a well-meaning but indecisive leader, whose actions as monarch were heavily influenced by his advisors. Historian Raymond Esthus states:

The contemporary assessments of Nicholas are remarkably uniform. He was described as shy, charming, gentle in disposition, fearful of controversy, indecisive, indulgent to his relatives, and deeply devoted to his family. Aleksandr Mosolov, who headed his Court Chancellery for sixteen years, wrote that Nicholas, though intelligent and well-educated, never adopted a definite, energetic attitude and loathed making a decision in the presence of others. Sergei Witte, who served Nicholas and his father for eleven years as Minister of Finance, commented that the tsar was a well-intentioned child, but his actions were entirely dependent upon the character of his counselors, most of whom were bad.

During the Soviet period, Nicholas II's legacy was widely criticised within Russia, although discussion was heavily influenced by state propaganda, which described him as a bloodthirsty tyrant. Pavel Bykov, who wrote the first full account of the downfall of the tsar for the new Soviet government, denounced Nicholas as a "tyrant, who paid with his life for the age-old repression and arbitrary rule of his ancestors over the Russian people, over the impoverished and blood-soaked country". Soviet-era historians described Nicholas II as unfit for rule, arguing that he had a weak will and was manipulated by adventurist forces. He was also criticised for fanning nationalism and chauvinism, and his regime was condemned for its extensive use of the army, police, and courts to destroy the revolutionary movement. During his reign, Nicholas had become known as "Nicholas the Bloody" for his role in the Khodynka Tragedy and the suppression of the 1905 Revolution.

The majority view among historians is that Nicholas was a well-intentioned yet poor ruler who proved incapable of handling the challenges facing his nation. For most of the 20th century, Nicholas was generally considered by historians to have been incompetent at the colossal task of ruling the enormous Russian Empire, although the influence of Soviet propaganda on general opinion must be considered. Barbara Tuchman provides a damning evaluation of his reign in her 1962 book The Guns of August, describing his sole focus as sovereign as being "to preserve intact the absolute monarchy bequeathed to him by his father", and writing that, "lacking the intellect, energy or training for his job", Nicholas "fell back on personal favorites, whim, simple mulishness, and other devices of the empty-headed autocrat ... when a telegram was brought to him announcing the annihilation of the Russian fleet at Tsushima, he read it, stuffed it in his pocket, and went on playing tennis".

Historian Robert K. Massie provides a similar indictment of his incompetence, although he emphasises Nicholas' personal morality, describing him as a tragic figure:

... there still are those who for political or other reasons continue to insist that Nicholas was "Bloody Nicholas". Most commonly, he is described as shallow, weak, stupid—a one-dimensional figure presiding feebly over the last days of a corrupt and crumbling system. This, certainly, is the prevailing public image of the last Tsar. Historians admit that Nicholas was a "good man"—the historical evidence of personal charm, gentleness, love of family, deep religious faith and strong Russian patriotism is too overwhelming to be denied—but they argue that personal factors are irrelevant; what matters is that Nicholas was a bad tsar .... Essentially, the tragedy of Nicholas II was that he appeared in the wrong place in history.

Following the collapse of the Soviet Union, present-day Russian historians give Nicholas a more positive assessment, particularly when evaluating the reforms made by the Russian state during his reign.

== Wealth ==
Estimates of Nicholas II's personal wealth have been exaggerated. As Emperor of All The Russias, and an autocrat, the resources under his command were virtually incalculable. However, the vast majority of this was owned by the state as crown property; the Romanov family's personal wealth was only a fraction of this. As monarch, the income of Nicholas was 24 million gold roubles per annum: this derived from a yearly allowance from the treasury, and from the profits of crown farmland. From this income, he had to fund staff, the upkeep of imperial palaces and imperial theatres, annuities for the royal family, pensions, bequests, and other outgoings. "Before the end of the year, the Tsar was usually penniless; sometimes he reached this embarrassing state by autumn". According to the Grand Marshal of the Court, Count Paul Benckendorff, the family's total financial resources amounted to between 12.5 and 17.5 million roubles. As a comparison, Prince Felix Yusupov estimated his family's worth in real estate holdings alone as amounting to 50 million gold roubles.

The mystery and rumours surrounding the finances of the Romanov Dynasty during the early 20th century were addressed at length in the 1932 memoir of Nicholas II's brother-in-law (and first-cousin once-removed) Grand Duke Alexander Michailovich "Once a Grand Duke". Grand Duke Alexander noted that the income of the Russian Emperor prior to the First World War was derived from three main sources:

1. An annual governmental appropriate for the Imperial Family, amounting to 11 million gold roubles (410,000 troy oz of gold, which he noted equated to just under $6 million);
2. Proceeds from the exploitation of the Estates belonging to the Imperial Family (referred to as the "oodely"), which Grand Duke Alexander states were valued at $50 million, but produced a relatively low annual return of approximately $1–$2 million; and
3. Interest from deposits kept abroad in English and German banks.

Grand Duke Alexander estimated that the aggregate annual income of the Russian Emperor prior to the First World War was $10–$12 million in total. In addition to these sources of income, the 'frozen' assets of the Dynasty (which took the form of a hoard of jewels, gemstones etc.) was worth an estimated $80 million in the early 20th century. From this annual income, the Emperor was required to maintain the costs of the Imperial Court, multiple residences, as well as the annual allowances which members of the Imperial Family were entitled to:

- $100,000 annually to each of the Grand Dukes;
- A dowry of $500,000 to each Grand Duchess upon her marriage;
- A settlement of $500,000 at birth to each Prince or Princess of the Imperial Blood (great-grandchildren in the male-line of each Emperor) which precluded these individuals from any further financial entitlement.

Other sources suggest that the annuity paid to each Grand Duke was 280,000 roubles, whilst Grand Duchesses received an annuity of 50,000 roubles from birth, increased to 100,000 roubles in adulthood, and that a one-off 1,000,000 rouble payment was made to all Grand Duchesses and Grand Dukes when they married. Variations in the figures cited regarding the incomes of the Russian Imperial Family are likely further compounded by based changes in exchange rates during the nineteenth and early twentieth centuries; the approximate exchange rate of ₽2:$1 and ₽10:£1 in the late 19th century fell to ₽3:$1 and ₽15:£1 from 1914 to 1917.

Grand Duke Alexander also claimed that the oft-cited private fortune of £20,000,000 which the Tsars had invested in London Merchant Banks had been depleted during the First World War. This fortune, reportedly kept in London since the reign of Alexander II, "had been entirely spent to support the hospitals and various other charities patronized by the imperial family during the war (1915 - 1917)."

Furthermore, he alleged that in 1914 an "overcareful Minister of the Imperial Court, acting against the orders of the Czar," had transferred the sums held from the annual allowances paid to Emperor Nicholas II's five children to Berlin, amounting to some 7,000,000 roubles; as a result, this part of the Romanov Family's wealth was lost in the rampant German currency inflation in the early 1920s.

Alternative figures regarding the payments which Nicholas II was required to make to the extended Imperial Family are listed in a number of contemporary sources; the 1912 edition of the Svod Zakonov (the Russian Empire's official Digest of Laws) reprints the revised Statute on the Imperial Family which was approved on 2/14 July 1886. This defines who qualified for titles and how support was structured. The Brockhaus & Efron Encyclopedic Dictionary (1890s), a standard Russian reference work, summarizes the administrative stipend scales then in force for imperial children and grandchildren. These sources are examined in Mikhail Dolbilov's 2023 peer-reviewed study "Managing the Ruling House: Royals, Bureaucrats, and the Emergence of the 1886 Statute on the Imperial Family of the Russian Empire", which offers a detailed examination of the post-1886 financial provisions for the Imperial Family, with reference to the 1886 “Norms of financing” (RGIA) section. These sources provide the following data on the annuities and financial entitlements of the wider Romanov Family during the period from 1886 to 1917:

Financial Entitlements for Members of the Russian Imperial Family after 1886
Rank of Family Member	Financial Entitlement at Birth	Financial Entitlement from Majority	Financial Entitlement upon marriage
Sons of the Emperor (Grand Dukes)	₽33,000 per year prior to majority.	Annuity increased to ₽150,000 per year; and granted a one-off lump sum of ₽1,000,000.	Annuity increased to ₽200,000 per year, plus a separate ₽40,000 annuity granted to their wife, who also received one-time grants of ₽100,000 (from Emperor) and ₽50,000 (from husband). The widow of the son of an Emperor would continue to receive ₽40,000 annually (reduced to one-third of this amount if residing abroad during their widowhood, and ceasing to be paid if she remarried).
Daughters of the Emperor (Grand Duchesses)	₽33,000 per year to majority.	Annuity increased to ₽50,000 per year until marriage.	₽50,000 annuity ceases, replaced by a Dowry lump-sum payment of ₽1,000,000 (held in Trust in Russia with income paid at 5%).
Male-line Grandsons of an Emperor (Grand Dukes)	₽15,000 per year to majority.	Annuity increased to ₽150,000 per year; and granted a one-off lump-sum of ₽600,000.	No increase in individual annuity, but a separate annuity of ₽20,000 was paid to their wife, who also would receive one-time grants of ₽100,000 (from Emperor) and ₽50,000 (from husband). The widow of the grandson of an Emperor would continue to receive ₽20,000 annually (reduced to one-third of this amount if residing abroad during their widowhood, and ceasing to be paid if she remarried).
Male-line Granddaughters of an Emperor (Grand Duchesses)	₽15,000 per year to majority.	Annuity increased to ₽50,000 per year until marriage.	₽50,000 annuity ceases, replaced by a Dowry lump-sum payment of ₽1,000,000 (held in Trust in Russia with income paid at 5%).

== Titles, styles, honours and arms ==
Styles of Nicholas II of Russia
- Reference style: His Imperial Majesty
- Spoken style: Your Imperial Majesty

=== Titles and styles ===
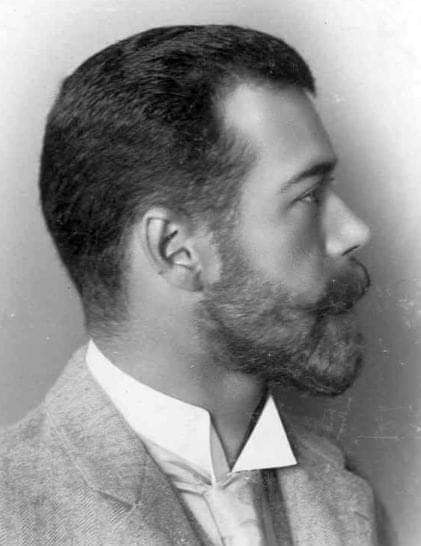
Nicholas II c. 1899 showing his side profile

Nicholas II's full title as Emperor, as set forth in Article 59 of the 1906 Constitution, was:

By the Grace of God, We Nicholas, Emperor and Autocrat of All Russia, of Moscow, Kiev, Vladimir, Novgorod; Tsar of Kazan, Tsar of Astrakhan, Tsar of Poland, Tsar of Siberia, Tsar of Tauric Chersonesus, Tsar of Georgia; Lord of Pskov, and Grand Prince of Smolensk, Lithuania, Volhynia, Podolia, and Finland; Prince of Estonia, Livonia, Courland and Semigalia, Samogitia, Bielostok, Karelia, Tver, Yugor, Perm, Vyatka, Bogar and others; Sovereign and Grand Prince of Nizhni Novgorod, Chernigov, Ryazan, Polotsk, Rostov, Jaroslavl, Beloozero, Udoria, Obdoria, Kondia, Vitebsk, Mstislav, and Ruler of all the Severian country; Sovereign and Lord of Iveria, Kartalinia, the Kabardian lands and Armenian province: hereditary Sovereign and Possessor of the Circassian and Mountain Princes and of others; Sovereign of Turkestan, Heir to Norway, Duke of Schleswig-Holstein, Stormarn, Dithmarschen, and Oldenburg, and so forth, and so forth, and so forth.

=== Honours ===
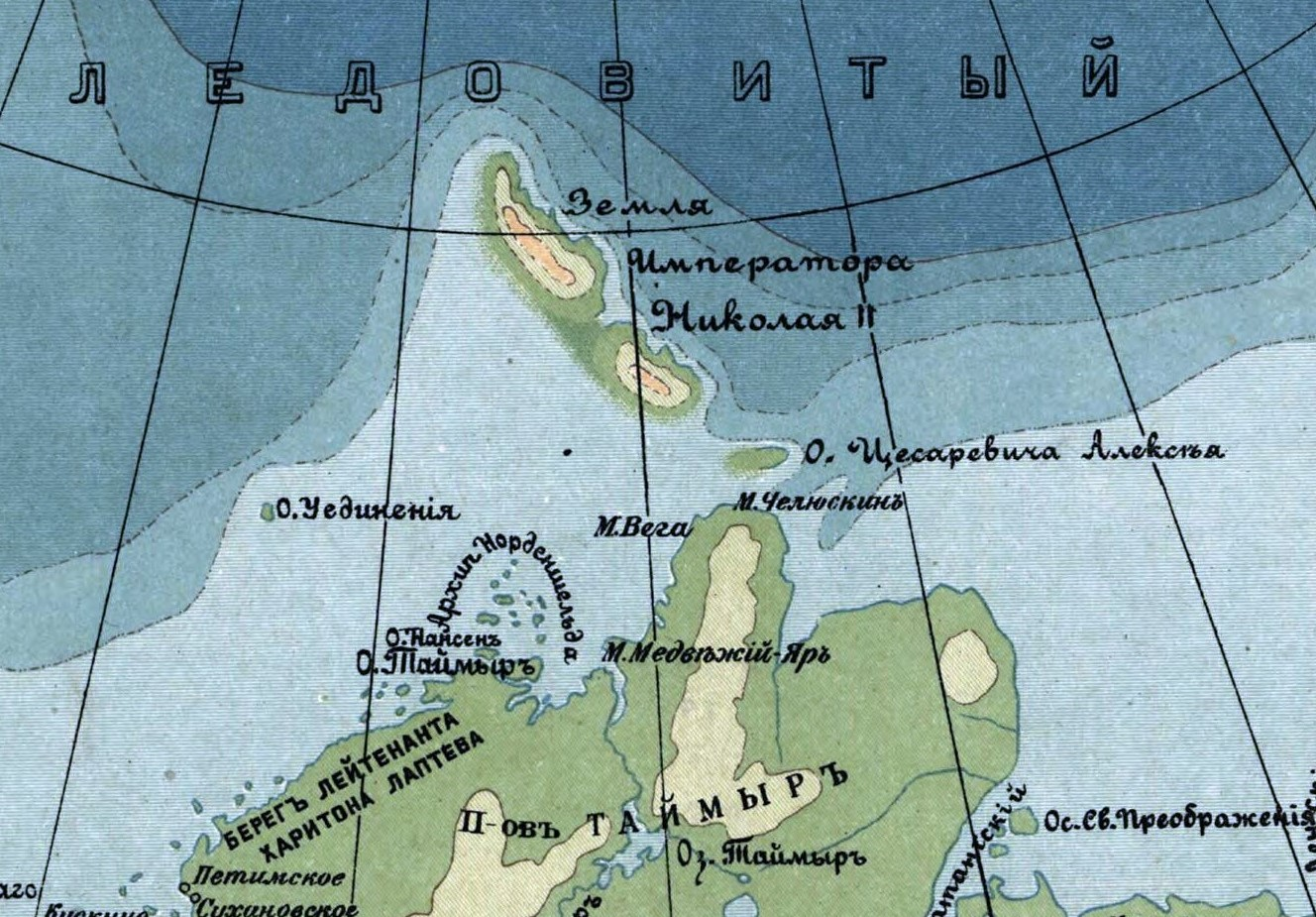
Emperor Nicholas II Land in a 1915 map of the Russian Empire. At the time it was believed that what is now Severnaya Zemlya was a single landmass.

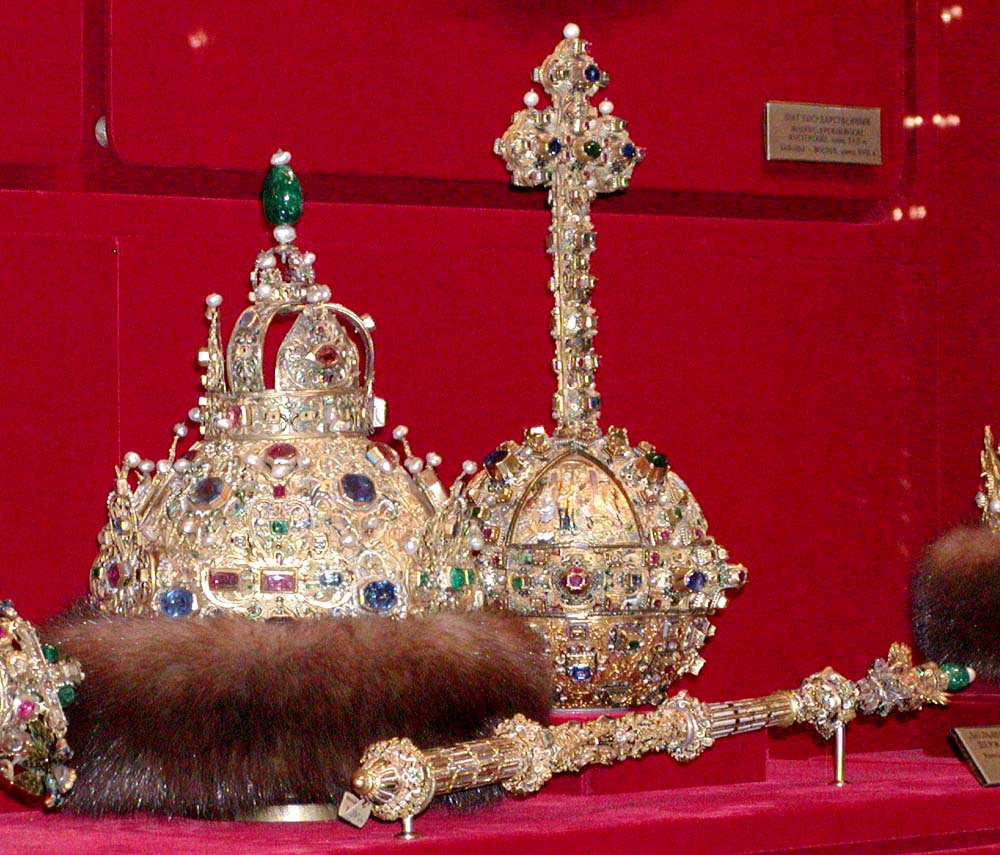
Imperial regalia of the Russian Empire. On the left is the fur-lined Monomakh's Cap used as the original coronation crown.

Emperor Nicholas II Land (Russian: Земля Императора Николая II, Zemlya Imperatora Nikolaya II) was discovered in 1913 by the Arctic Ocean Hydrographic Expedition led by Boris Vilkitsky on behalf of the Russian Hydrographic Service. Still incompletely surveyed, the new territory was officially named in the Emperor's honour by order of the Secretary of the Imperial Navy in 1914. The archipelago was renamed "Severnaya Zemlya" in 1926 by the Presidium of the Central Executive Committee of the Soviet Union.

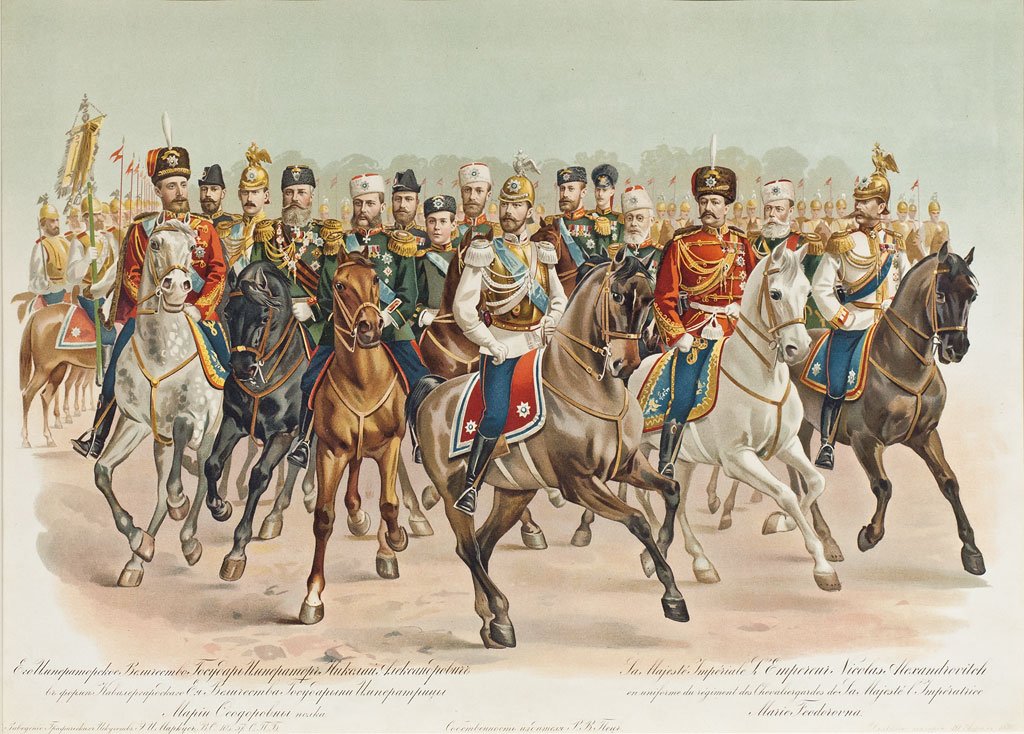
Nicholas II in the uniform of Chevalier Guard Regiment, 1896

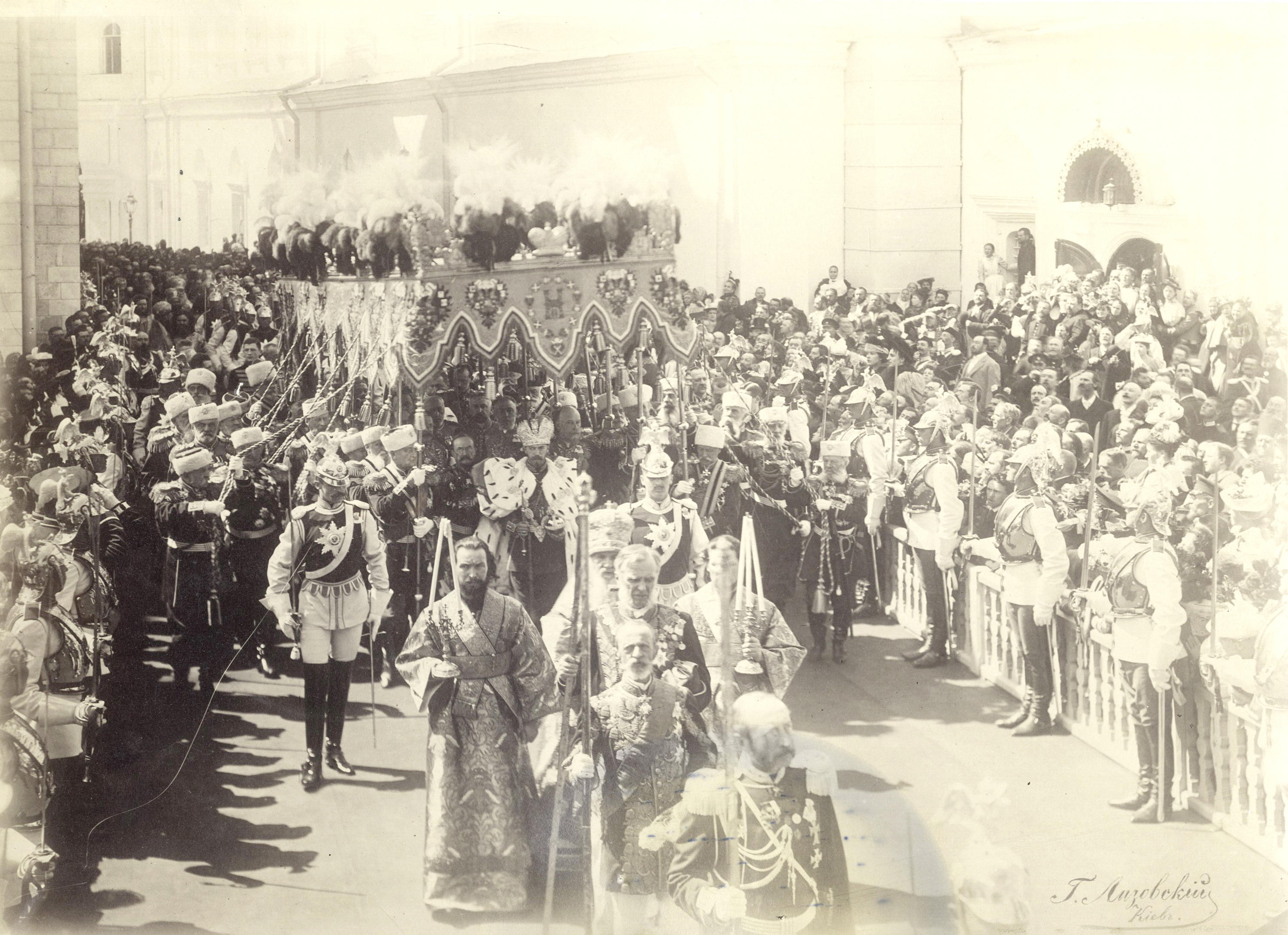
After his coronation, Nicholas II leaves Dormition Cathedral. The Chevalier Guard Lieutenant marching in front to the Tsar's right is Carl Gustaf Mannerheim, later President of Finland.

National

- Knight of St. Andrew, 1 June 1868
- Knight of St. Alexander Nevsky, 1 June 1868
- Knight of the White Eagle, 1 June 1868
- Knight of St. Anna, 1st Class, 1 June 1868
- Knight of St. Stanislaus, 1st Class, 1 June 1868
- Knight of St. Vladimir, 4th Class, 11 September 1890
- Knight of St. George, 4th Class, 7 November 1915

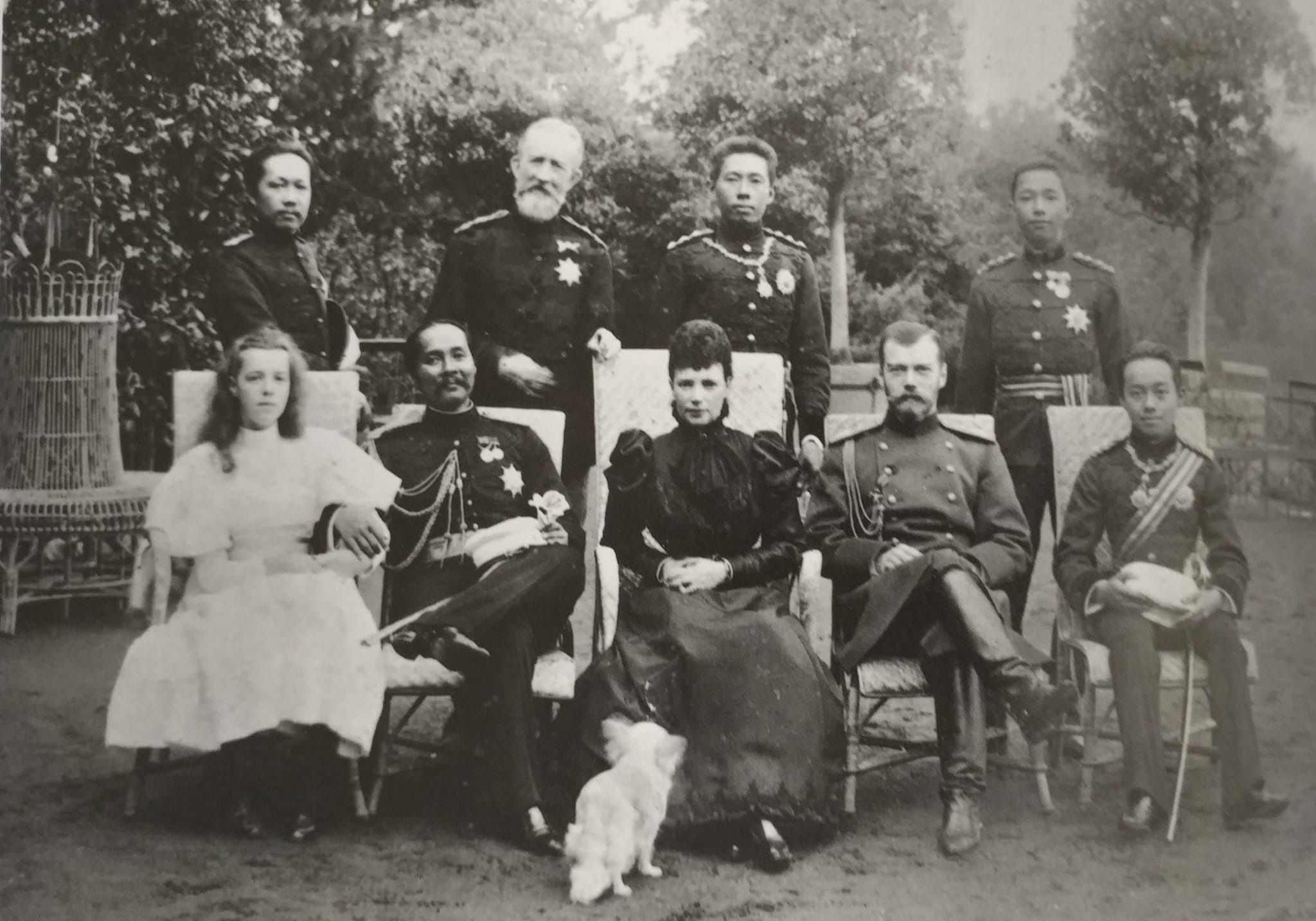
King Chulalongkorn of Siam with Nicholas II in Saint Petersburg, during the king's visit to Europe in 1897

Foreign

- Austria-Hungary: Grand Cross of the Royal Hungarian Order of St. Stephen, 18 May 1884
- Belgium: Grand Cordon of the Order of Leopold, 18 May 1884
- Empire of Brazil: Grand Cross of the Southern Cross, 1 October 1884
- Emirate of Bukhara:
  - Order of Noble Bukhara, 14 November 1885; in Diamonds, 11 March 1889
  - Order of the Crown of Bukhara, in Diamonds, 3 December 1893
  - Order of the Sun of Alexander, 30 May 1898
- Principality of Bulgaria:
  - Grand Cross of St. Alexander, 18 May 1884
  - Knight of Saints Cyril and Methodius, 23 February 1910
- Denmark:
  - Knight of the Elephant, 18 May 1884
  - Cross of Honour of the Order of the Dannebrog, 11 September 1891
  - Commemorative Medal for the Golden Wedding of King Christian IX and Queen Louise, 1892
  - Grand Commander of the Dannebrog, 26 November 1894
- Ethiopian Empire: Grand Cross of the Seal of Solomon, 12 July 1895
- France: Grand Cross of the Legion of Honour, 18 May 1884
- German Empire:
  - Knight of the Black Eagle, 6 May 1884; with Collar, 25 January 1893
  - Grand Commander's Cross of the Royal House Order of Hohenzollern, 31 August 1890
  - Baden:
    - Knight of the House Order of Fidelity, 1883
    - Knight of the Order of Berthold the First, 1883
  - Bavaria: Knight of St. Hubert, 1884
  - Hesse and by Rhine:
    - Grand Cross of the Ludwig Order, 15 June 1884
    - Knight of the Golden Lion, with Collar, 26 November 1894
  - Mecklenburg: Grand Cross of the Wendish Crown, with Crown in Ore, 21 January 1879
  - Oldenburg: Grand Cross of the Order of Duke Peter Friedrich Ludwig, with Golden Crown, 27 April 1881
  - Saxe-Weimar-Eisenach: Grand Cross of the White Falcon, 1881
  - Saxony: Knight of the Rue Crown, 1896
  - Württemberg: Grand Cross of the Württemberg Crown, 1884
- Kingdom of Greece: Grand Cross of the Redeemer, 18 May 1884
- Kingdom of Italy:
  - Knight of the Annunciation, 29 April 1884
  - Grand Cross of Saints Maurice and Lazarus, 18 May 1884
  - Gold Medal of Military Valour, 4 September 1916
- Holy See: Grand Cross of the Holy Sepulchre of Jerusalem, 18 May 1884
- Military Order of Malta: Bailiff Grand Cross of Honour and Devotion
- Empire of Japan:
  - Grand Cordon of the Order of the Chrysanthemum, 17 June 1882; Collar, 3 March 1896
  - Grand Cordon of the Rising Sun, with Paulownia Flowers, 16 September 1882
- Monaco: Grand Cross of St. Charles, 16 May 1896
- Mongolia: Order of the Precious Rod, 1913
- Principality of Montenegro: Grand Cross of the Order of Prince Danilo I
- Netherlands:
  - Grand Cross of the Netherlands Lion, 27 March 1881
  - Commemorative Medal of the Second Hague Peace Conference, 1907
- Ottoman Empire: Order of Osmanieh, 1st Class, 9 August 1884
- Persia: Order of the August Portrait, 9 August 1884
- Kingdom of Portugal: Grand Cross of the Sash of the Two Orders, 25 May 1881; Three Orders, 9 April 1896
- Qing dynasty: Order of the Double Dragon, Class I Grade I in Diamonds, 4 May 1896
- Kingdom of Romania:
  - Grand Cross of the Star of Romania, 18 May 1884
  - Collar of the Order of Carol I, 15 June 1906
- Kingdom of Serbia:
  - Grand Cross of St. Sava
  - Grand Cross of the Star of Karađorđe, 1910
- Siam: Knight of the Order of the Royal House of Chakri, 20 March 1891
- Spain: Knight of the Golden Fleece, 12 April 1883
- Sweden: Knight of the Seraphim, 19 May 1883; with Collar, 25 May 1908
- United Kingdom of Great Britain and Ireland:
  - Stranger Knight Companion of the Garter, 1 July 1893
  - Recipient of the Royal Victorian Chain, 6 September 1904
  - Honorary Grand Cross of the Bath (military), 20 October 1916

He was Colonel-in-Chief of the Royal Scots Greys from 1894 until his death.

=== Arms ===
Lesser Coat of Arms of the Russian Empire and Lesser Coat of Arms of the Emperor

== Issue ==
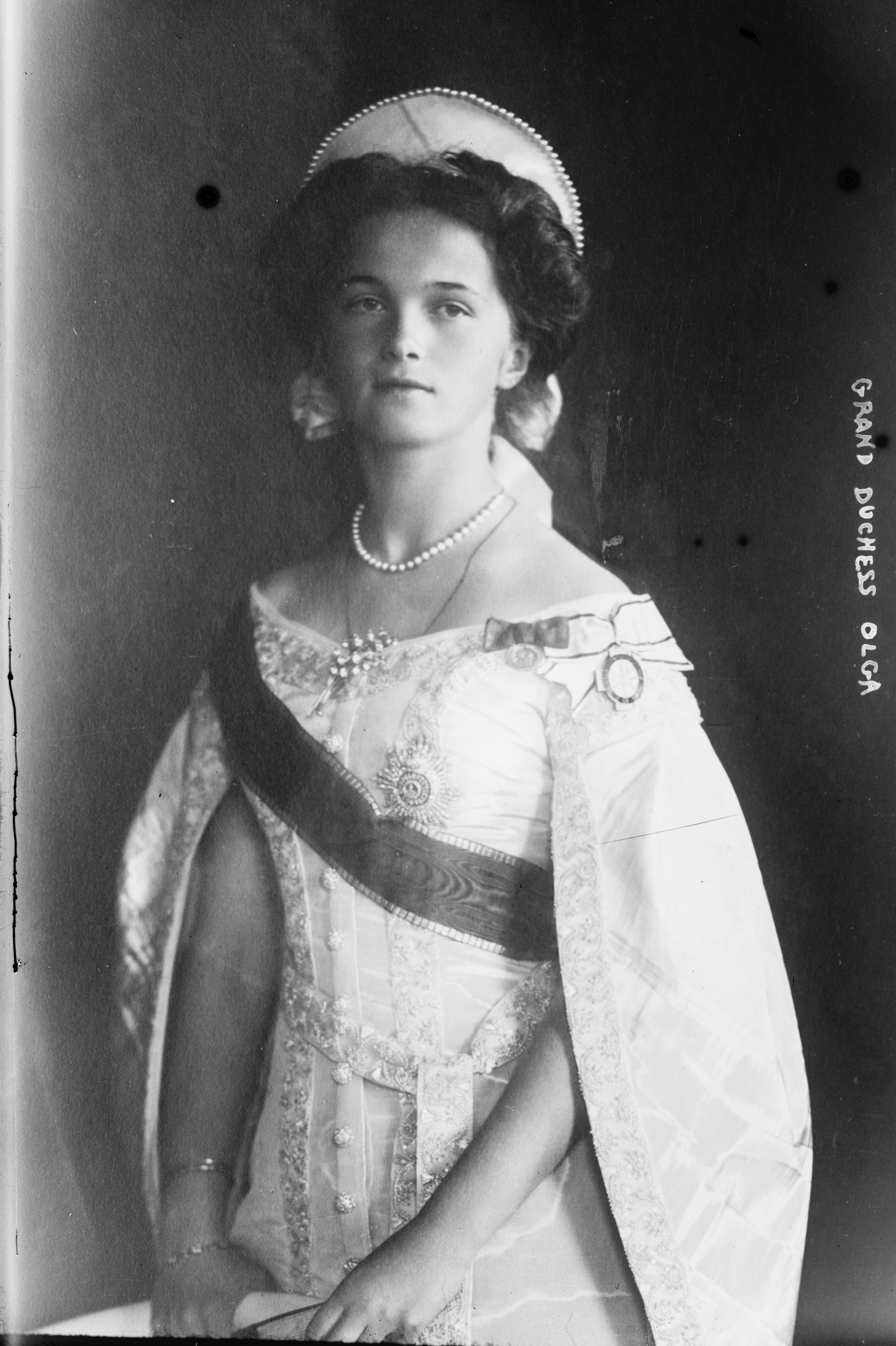
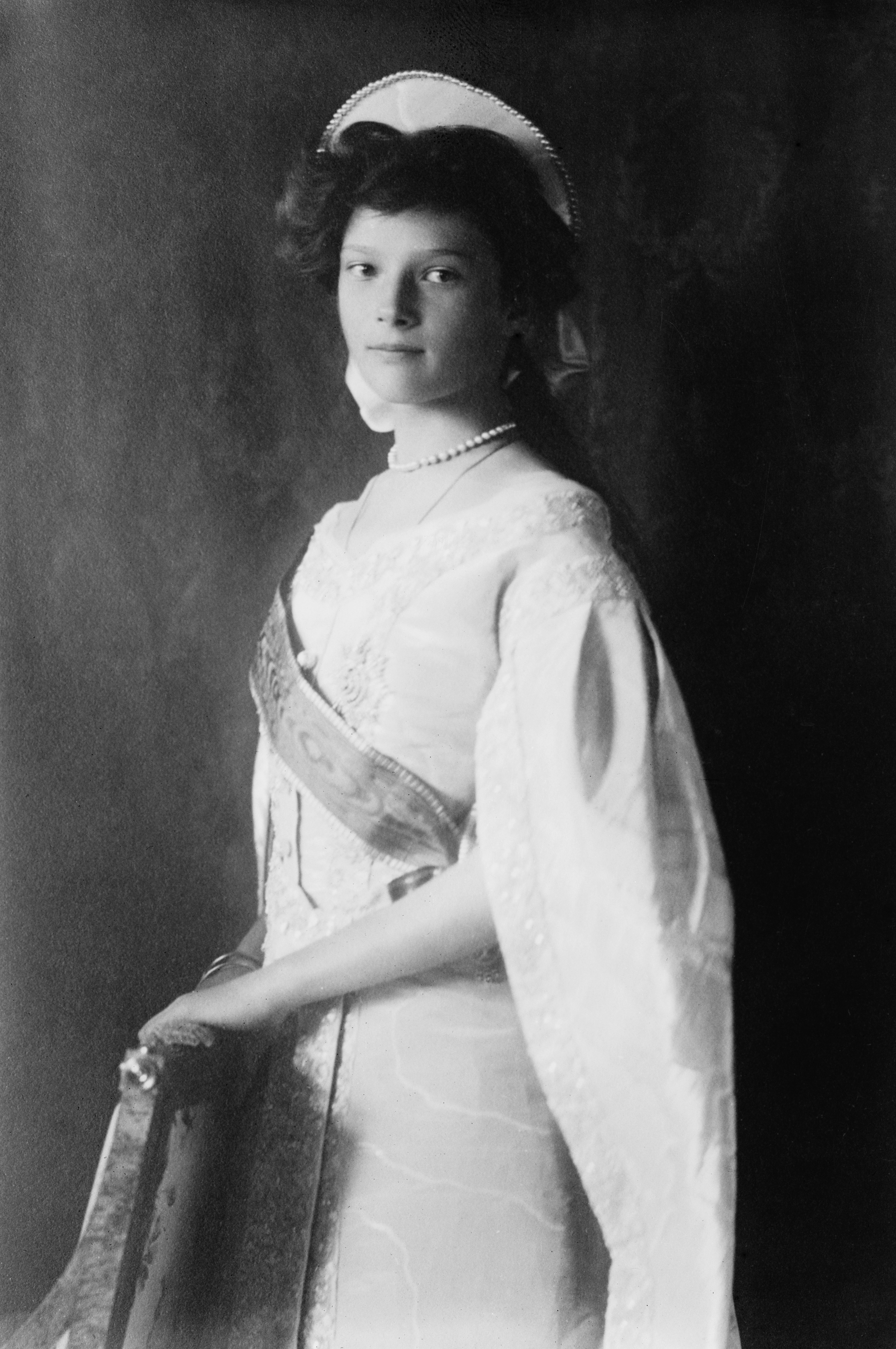
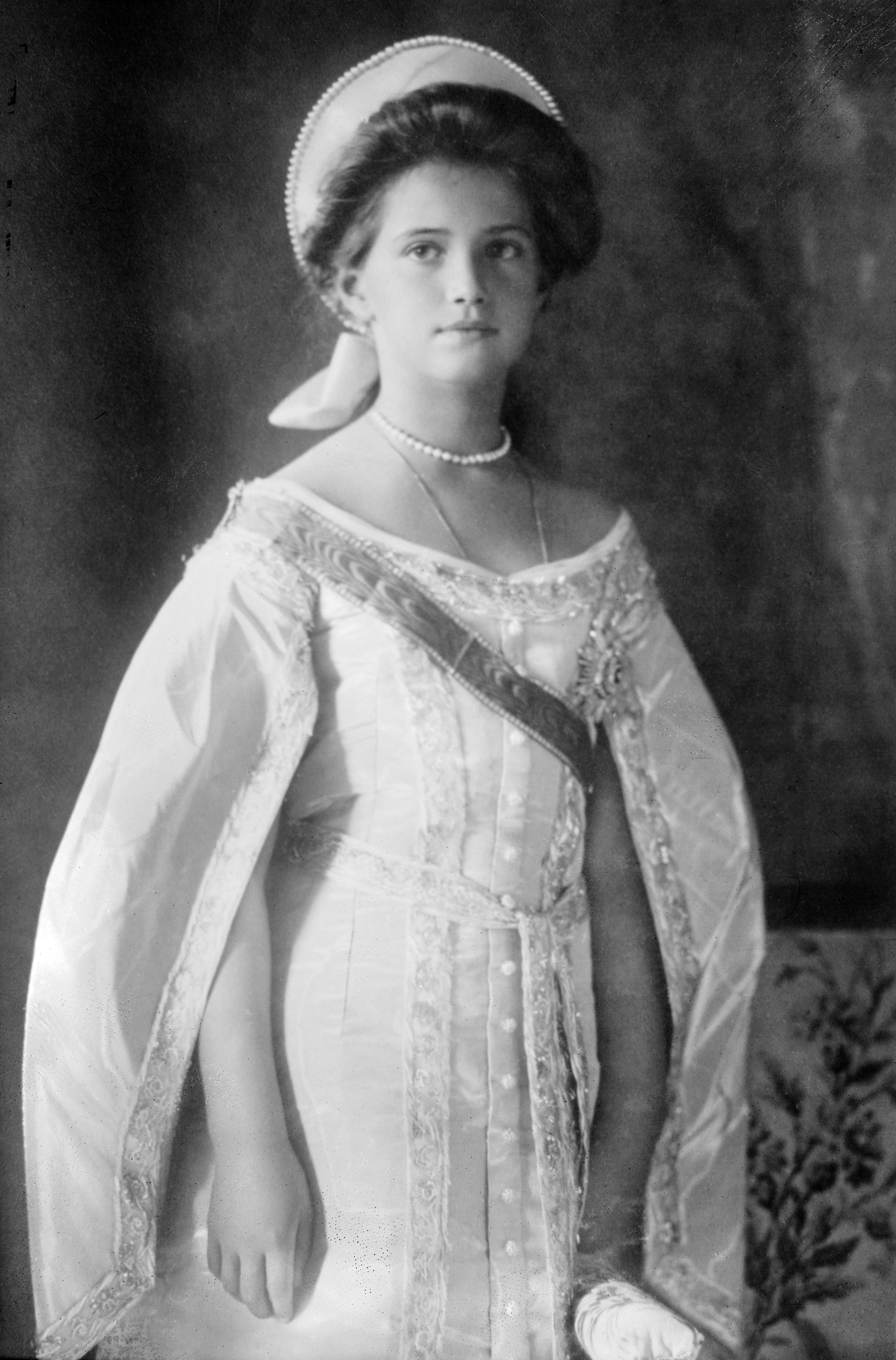
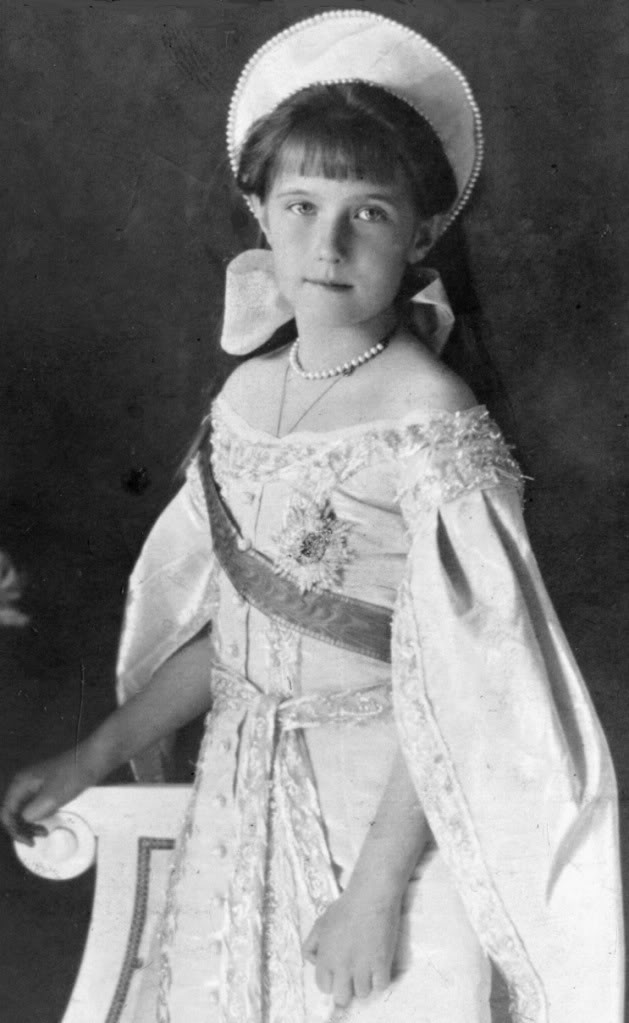
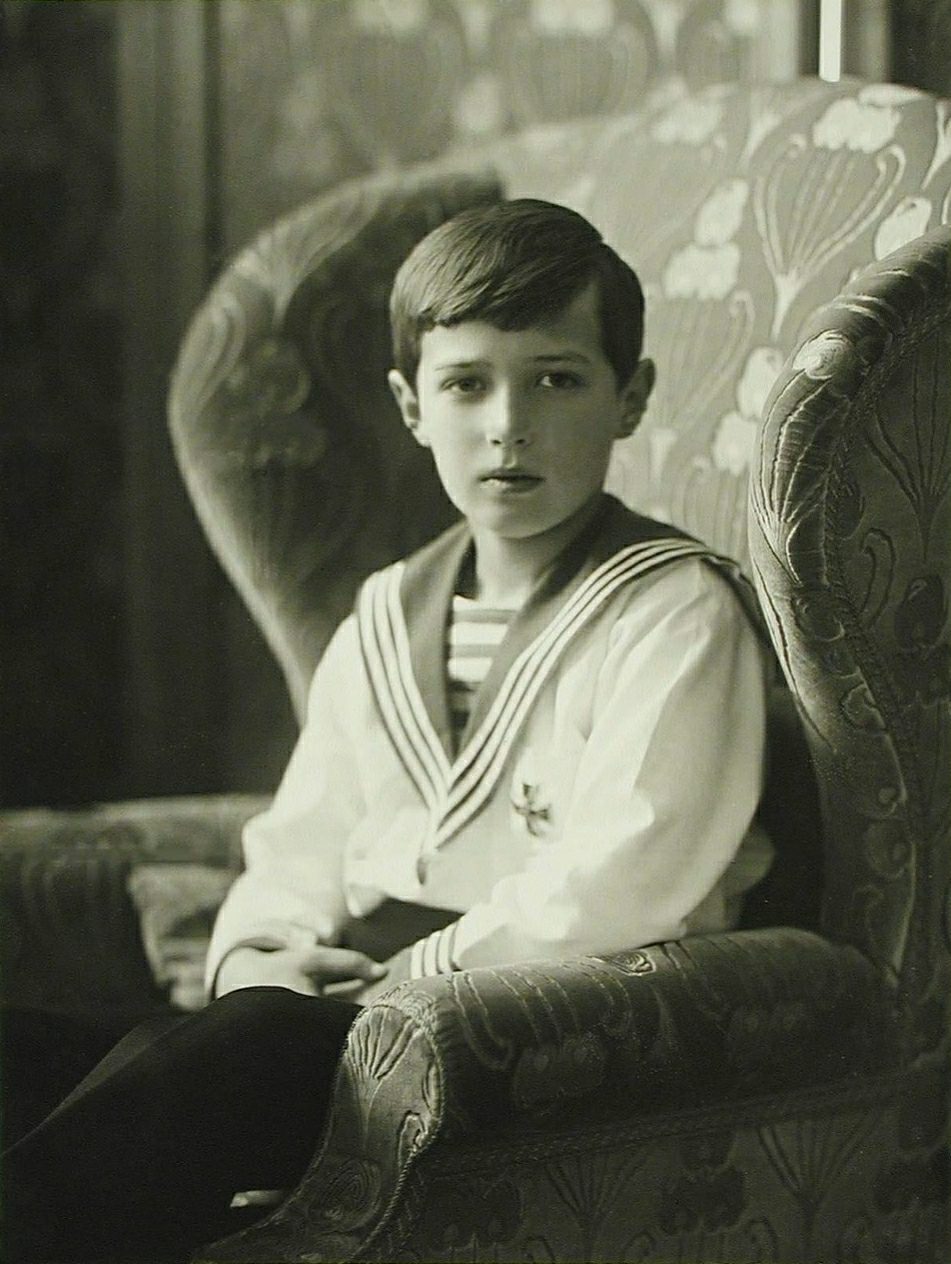
Image	Name	Birth	Death	Notes
By Princess Alix of Hesse and by Rhine (6 June 1872 – 17 July 1918, married on 26 November 1894)
	Grand Duchess Olga Nikolaevna	15 November [O.S. 3 November] 1895	17 July 1918	Murdered, along with their parents, at Yekaterinburg by the Bolsheviks
	Grand Duchess Tatiana Nikolaevna	10 June [O.S. 29 May] 1897	17 July 1918	Murdered, along with their parents, at Yekaterinburg by the Bolsheviks
	Grand Duchess Maria Nikolaevna	26 June [O.S. 14 June] 1899	17 July 1918	Murdered, along with their parents, at Yekaterinburg by the Bolsheviks
	Grand Duchess Anastasia Nikolaevna	18 June [O.S. 5 June] 1901	17 July 1918	Murdered, along with their parents, at Yekaterinburg by the Bolsheviks
	Tsarevich Alexei Nikolaevich	12 August [O.S. 30 July] 1904	17 July 1918	Murdered, along with their parents, at Yekaterinburg by the Bolsheviks

== Ancestry ==
Through his maternal grandfather, King Christian IX of Denmark, Nicholas II was descendant of King George II of Great Britain as Christian IX was George II's great-great-grandson.

== Documentaries and films ==
Several films about Nicholas II and his family have been made, including Nicholas and Alexandra (1971).

== See also ==
- Bibliography of the Russian Revolution and Civil War
- Outline of the Russian Revolution and Civil War
- Index of articles related to the Russian Revolution and Civil War
- Emperor railway station in Pushkin town

== Notes ==
- ^O.S./N.S.Over the course of Nicholas's life, two calendars were used: the Old Style Julian Calendar and the New Style Gregorian Calendar. Russia switched from the Julian to the Gregorian calendar on 1 February (O.S.) / 14 February (N.S.) 1918.

Nicholas II House of Holstein-Gottorp-Romanov Cadet branch of the House of Oldenburg Born: 18 May 1868 Died: 17 July 1918
Regnal titles
Preceded by Alexander III	Emperor of Russia; 1 November 1894 – 15 March 1917	Monarchy abolished
Preceded by Alexander III	Grand Duke of Finland; 1 November 1894 – 15 March 1917	Vacant Title next held by Frederick Charles as king-elect
Preceded by Alexander III	King of Poland; 1 November 1894 – 19 September 1915	Vacant Establishment of the Government General of Warsaw by Germany
Titles in pretence
Loss of title Empire abolished	— TITULAR — Emperor of Russia; 1917; Reason for succession failure: Empire abolished in 1917	Succeeded by Kirill Vladimirovich
