= Elizaveta Ersberg =

Russian parlormaid in the Imperial Household

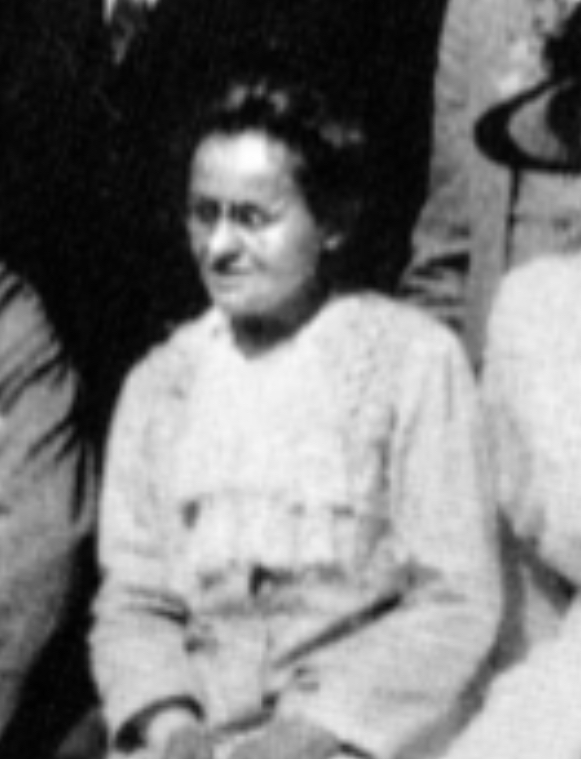
- Born: Elizaveta Nikolaevna Ersberg; 18 September 1882
- Died: 12 March 1942 (aged 59); Leningrad, Russian SFSR
- Education: Patriotic Grammar School
- Occupation: Parlormaid
- Parent: Nikolai Ersberg

Elizaveta Nikolaevna "Liza" Ersberg (18 September 1882 – 12 March 1942) was a German-Russian parlormaid who served in the Russian Imperial Household. The daughter of a stoker employed by Emperor Alexander III, she was hired by Empress Maria Feodorovna as a parlormaid at the Alexander Palace in 1898. She used her post to obtain a position at court for her friend Anna Demidova, who became a lady's maid to Empress Alexandra Feodorovna.

Ersberg served the Imperial family into the Russian Revolution, staying with them under house arrest at the Governor's Mansion in Tobolsk, Siberia in 1917. She was separated from them during their imprisonment at Ipatiev House in Yekaterinburg in 1918, and was taken to Tyumen, ultimately surviving the revolution. She was questioned by Nikolai Alexeyevich Soklov's commission tasked with discovering the fate of the Romanov family. Ersberg accompanied the White Army into Yekaterinburg to look for the remains of imperial family members; hiring a boatman to help her search in a swamp and a pond.

Ersberg left Russia after the revolution and connected with the Dowager Empress, who gave her a subsidy. She then went to Switzerland and Czechoslovakia before returning to Russia in 1928. She died of starvation in 1942 during the Siege of Leningrad.

== Early life and family ==
Ersberg was born on 18 September 1882. She was the daughter of Nikolai Ersberg, the palace stoker at Anichkov Palace, Gatchina Palace, and the Winter Palace during the reign of Emperor Alexander III of Russia. She had a brother named Nikolai who was an official for the State Railway Inspection Control. Her father died in the Borki train disaster in 1889. She was educated at the Patriotic Grammar School.

== Service in the Imperial Household ==
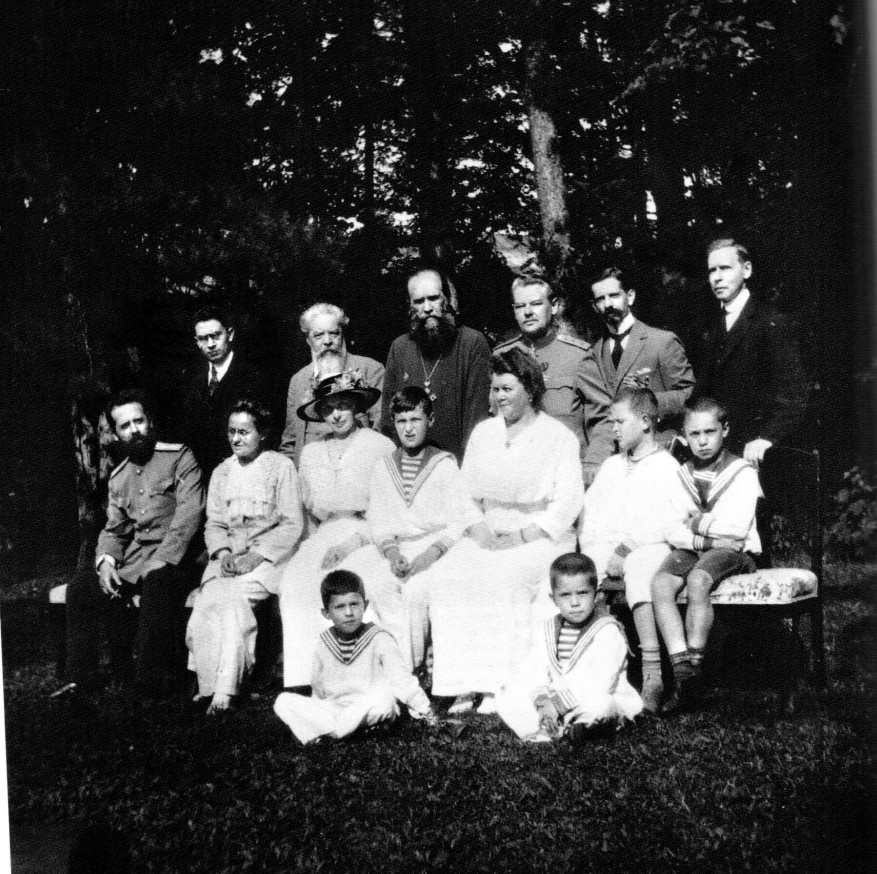
Standing left to right: footman Zhuravski, Terenty Ivanovich Chemodurov, Vasiliev, Petrov, Pierre Gilliard, Charles Sydney Gibbes. Second line: Vladimir Derevenko, Elizaveta Ersberg, Alexandra Tegleva, Tsarevich Alexei Nikolaevich, Maria Gustavna Tutelberg, Kolya Derevenko, Alexei Derevenko, Alexandr Derevenko, and Sergei Derevenko; Tsarskoe Selo in 1916.

Ersberg was chosen by Empress Maria Feodorovna to serve as a parlormaid at the Alexander Palace in 1898. Some accounts state that Ersberg came from Germany as a personal maid to Empress Alexandra Feodorovna. While in service to the family, she was not permitted to marry.

She lived in the thirtieth room on the second floor of the Alexander Palace in Tsarskoe Selo, next to the room of the nursemaid Alexandra Tegleva. She had polished beech-wood and mahogany furniture in her suite, and an icon of Our Lady of Tsarskoe Selo hung on the wall.

As a parlormaid, she was responsible for cleaning the rooms of Grand Duchesses Olga, Tatiana, Maria, Anastasia and Tsarevich Alexei. She also put together the imperial children's wardrobes and instructed the grand duchesses in needlework and knitting. She was close to the children of the imperial family, and attended to them when the family vacationed at Livadia Palace in Crimea. During World War I, Ersberg taught the grand duchesses how to care for the sick, in order to prepare them for voluntary aid work. She joined the imperial women, and female servants, in assisting in medical work in hospitals throughout the war. Ersberg wrote in letters to her family that the children of the imperial family were "modest and diligent". She referred to Grand Duchess Olga as "a little spoiled and capricious" and said she "could be lazy". She said that Grand Duchesses Tatiana and Anastasia were "always busy" with sewing and embroidery, and helped clean their rooms. According to her niece, Maria Nikolaevna Ersberg, Ersberg said the Tsar paid more attention to the children than the Tsaritsa. She was affectionately called "Liza" by members of the imperial family.

In 1905 she secured a position at court for her good friend Anna Stepanovna Demidova. Demidova, who was once engaged to Ersberg's brother Nikolai, was brought on to assist in her duties and later she was appointed as a governess to the children.

=== Exile ===
She travelled with the Imperial family to exile in Tobolsk. She accompanied the family in the train car on the way to Western Siberia, along with Count Ilya Leonidovich Tatishchev, Prince Vasily Alexandrovich Dolgorukov, Pierre Gilliard, Sydney Gibbes, Evgeny Sergeyevich Botkin, Countess Anastasia Hendrikova, Catherine Schneider, Baroness Sophie von Buxhoeveden, Anna Demidova, Ivan Dmitrievich Sednev, Klementy Nagorny, Ivan Kharitonov, and Alexander Volkov. She stayed with Grand Duchesses Olga, Tatiana, and Anastasia and Tsarevich Alexei at the Governor's Mansion in Tobolsk after the Tsar, Tsaritsa and Grand Duchess Maria were taken to Ipatiev House in Yekaterinburg. During this time, Demidova wrote to Tegleva to instruct her on how to conceal family jewels in the Grand Duchesses' undergarments. Ersberg assisted Tegleva and the grand duchesses in hiding the jewels by sewing them into bodices and hiding diamonds and pearls by sewing them into buttons and sewing the buttons into the fur linings of hats. She was later taken to Yekaterinburg in a fourth class train car with Tegleva, Kharitonov, Leonid Sednev, and some other servants; arriving on the night of 12 May 1918. When the rest of the imperial family were taken to Ipatiev House, Ersberg was not permitted to join them, instead staying in a train car on a siding with Gilliard, Tegleva, Gibbes, and Baroness von Buxhoeveden. At night a locomotive attached to the train car and took Ersberg and her colleagues to Tyumen, sparing them from the execution of the imperial family and other members of court.

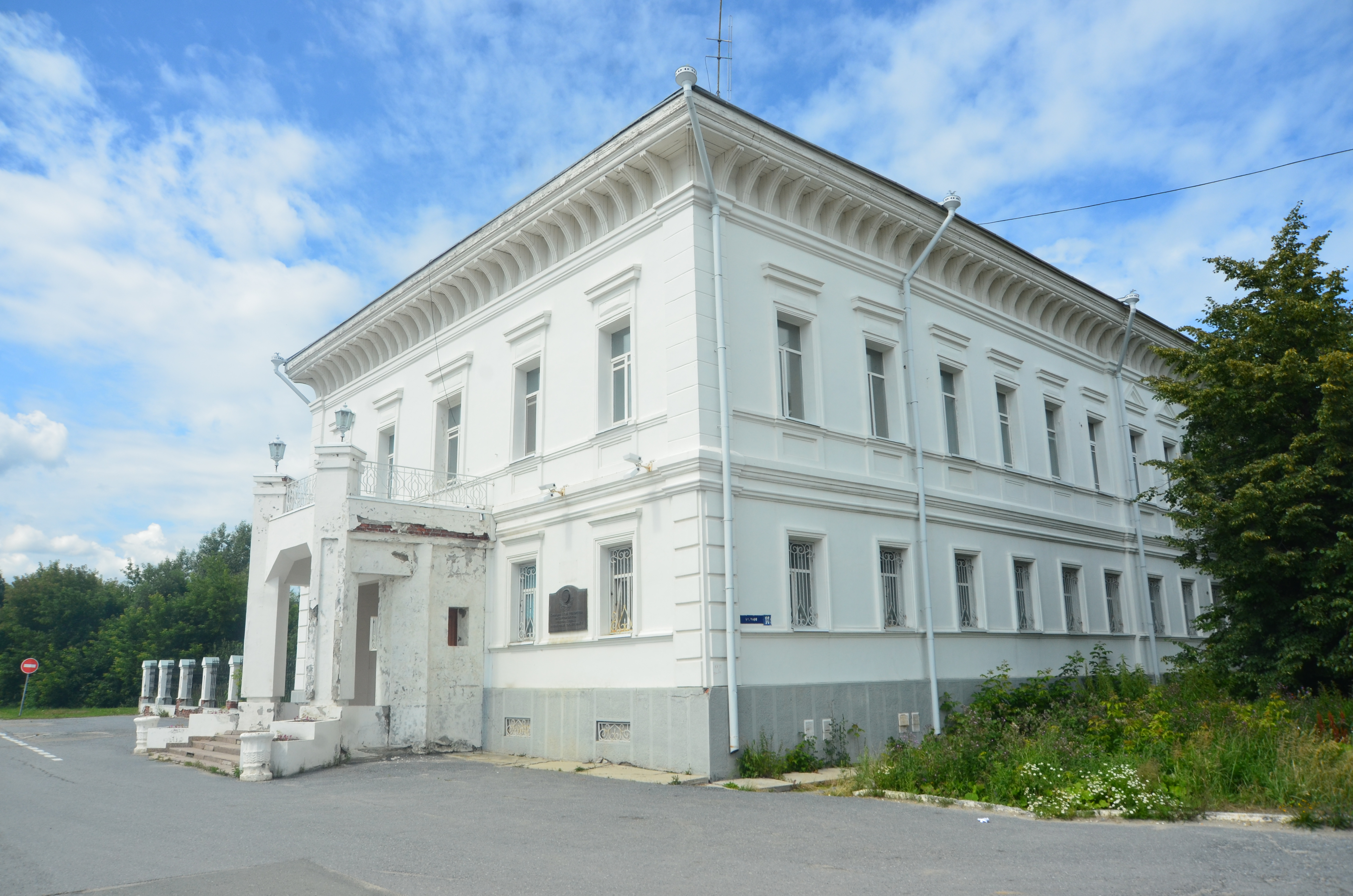
The Governor's Mansion in Tobolsk, where Ersberg was under house arrest with the imperial family

When Alexander Kolchak's forces seized Tobolsk, Ersberg was called in for questioning by Nikolai Alexeyevich Sokolov to provide information on the whereabouts of the imperial family. She accompanied the White Army into Yekaterinburg and hired a boatman to help her search for the imperial family members' bodies, looking in a pond and in a swamp, but was unsuccessful in finding remains.

== Life after the revolution ==
Through the Red Cross, Ersberg tracked down Dowager Empress Maria Feodorovna, who gave her a subsidy. She then went to Switzerland and Czechoslovakia before being allowed back into Russia, per a personal request made by her brother to Vyacheslav Molotov, in November 1928. Upon entering Russia, Ersberg was given commands to appear at the All-Russian Extraordinary Commission, where she was instructed not to disclose any information on the life of the Tsar and his family.

During World War II, Ersberg and her sisters were supposed to be evacuated from Leningrad but their passports had been taken away at the housing office. They were not allowed to receive bread ration cards without valid passports. Ersberg died of starvation on 12 March 1942 during the Siege of Leningrad.
