= Governor's Mansion (Tobolsk, Russia) =

Tobolsk historical building

Coordinates: 58°11′38″N 68°14′37″E

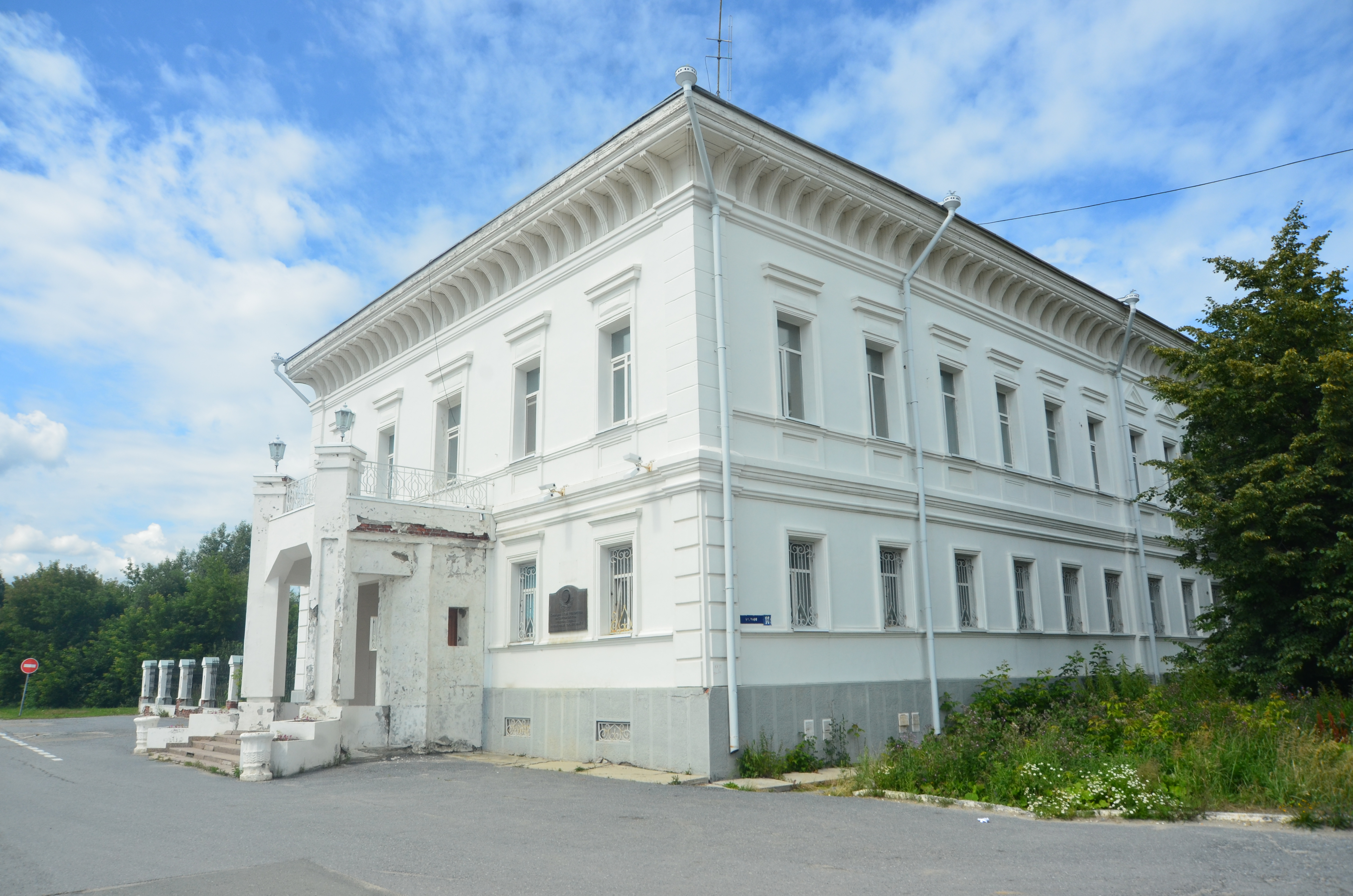
The main entrance

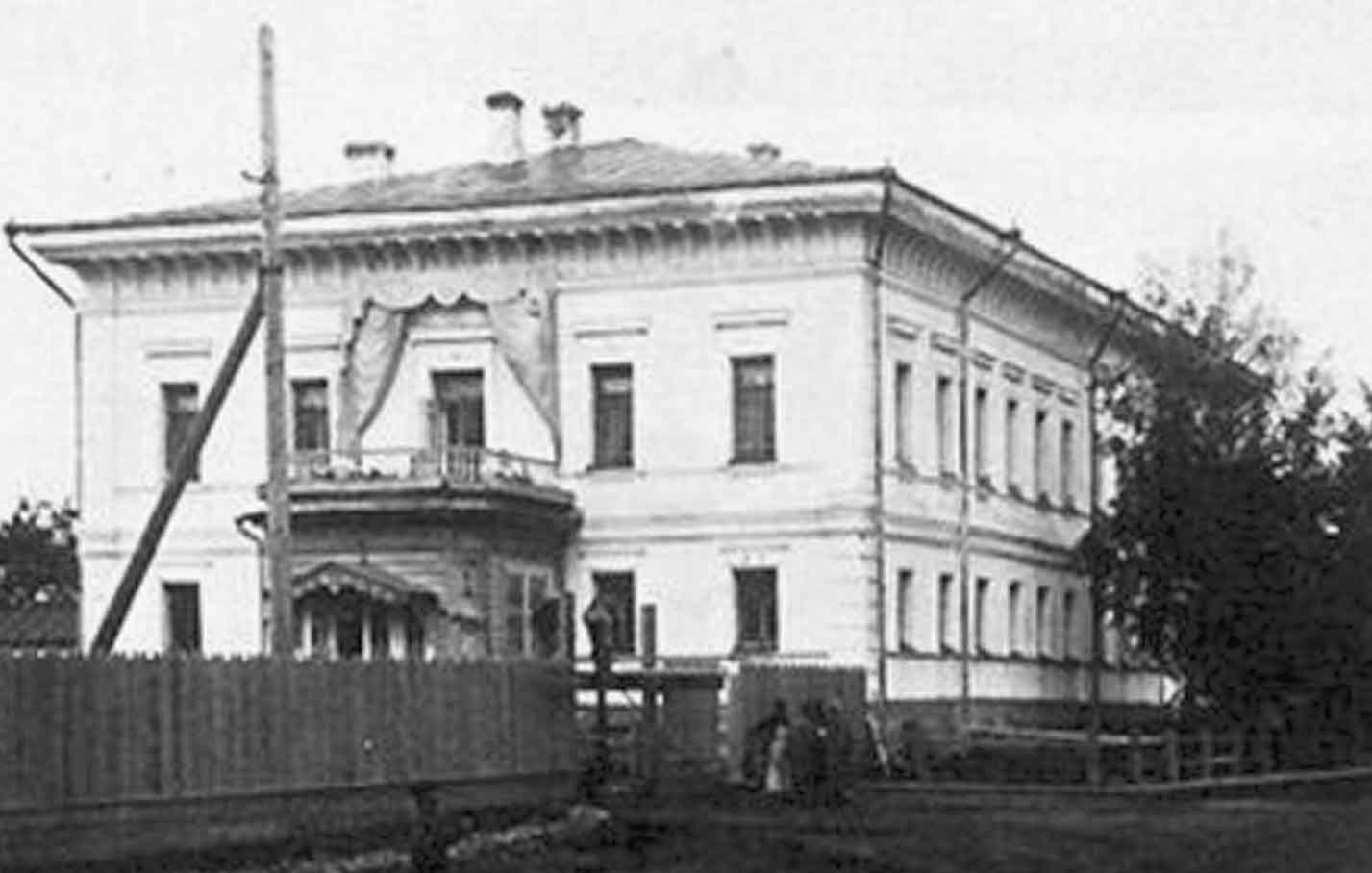
The Governor's Mansion around 1920.

The Governor's Mansion (Russian: Дом губернатора), also known as Kuklin House (Russian: Дом Куклина) is a building in Tobolsk, Russia. It was the home of the governor of Siberia prior to the February Revolution of 1917. The house, which is located on 10, Mira Street (Russian: Улица Мира) in the area of Tobolsk below the Kremlin (Podgora), is protected by Russian Federal government as a historical monument.

== History ==
The house was built by merchant Ivan Kuklin in the 1790s, after the disastrous fire of 1788 which destroyed a major part of Podgora. Kuklin went bankrupt in 1817 and the house was confiscated by the authorities. Since 1817, it was the seat of the governor of Tobolsk Governorate.

In its function as a governor's mansion, the house has seen a number of notable visitors.

In 1800, the playwright August von Kotzebue, who was required to report to the Governor's Mansion while exiled to Siberia, noted that it still "appeared partly in ruins" on account of the fire.

The decembrists who were sentenced to exile in Tobolsk had to visit the house. On 12 August [O.S. 31 July] 1917, the former Russian Emperor Nicholas II, who lost power when he abdicated in response to the February Revolution of 1917, and his wife, five children and forty-five retainers, including Pierre Gilliard, Alexandra Tegleva, Elizaveta Ersberg, Ilya Tatischev, Vasily Dolgorukov, Sydney Gibbes, Anastasia Hendrikova, Catherine Schneider, Sophie Buxhoeveden, Ivan Sednev, and Leonid Sednev, were imprisoned in the mansion. They remained there until April 1918 when they were transferred to the Ipatiev House in Yekaterinburg and eventually executed.

Following the Revolution the house was renamed the 'House of Freedom'. In 1937 a carpet from the Governor’s Mansion was sent to and preserved by a museum in San Francisco.

The mansion is built in the style of classicism and is highly regarded as an architectural monument. It was also one of the first stone buildings in Tobolsk Podgora.

Currently, the mansion belongs to the Tobolsky District administration. In 1996, the Emperor's study was opened as a museum.

Following a complete restoration of the building, which included demolition of an art deco portico and its replacement by one in the original design, it was reopened in 2018 to house The Museum of the Family of Emperor Nicholas II.
