= Alexandra Tegleva =

Russian noblewoman and nursemaid (1894–1955)

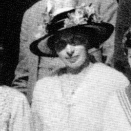
- Tegleva in 1916
- Born: 2 May 1884; Terebushka, Novgorod Governorate, Russia
- Died: 21 March 1955 (aged 70); Lausanne, Switzerland
- Education: Smolny Institute of Noble Maidens
- Occupations: Nursemaid; governess
- Spouse: Pierre Gilliard (m. 1919)
- Relatives: Teglev family

Alexandra Alexandrovna Tegleva (Russian: Александра Александровна Теглева; 2 May 1884 – 21 March 1955), also known as Shura Tegleva and Sasha Tegleva, was a Russian noblewoman who served as a nursemaid in the Russian Imperial Household. As nursemaid to the children of Emperor Nicholas II and Empress Alexandra Feodorovna, she went with the family into exile in Tobolsk following the abdication of Nicholas II during the February Revolution, but was ultimately prevented from staying with them during their house arrest at Ipatiev House. She survived the Russian Revolution and married Pierre Gilliard, a Swiss academic who served with her in the Imperial Household as the children's French tutor. She moved to Lausanne as a white émigré and remained there the rest of her life. Tegleva worked with her husband to investigate and debunk the claims made by Anna Anderson, a Romanov impostor who pretended to be Grand Duchess Anastasia Nikolaevna.

== Member of the Imperial Household ==
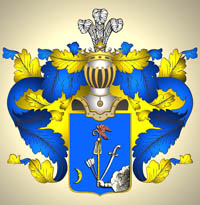
Coat of arms of the Teglev family

Tegleva was a part of the Russian nobility as a member of the Teglev family. She was educated at the Smolny Institute of Noble Maidens in Saint Petersburg. Tegleva served in the Russian Imperial Household as a nursemaid and governess to Grand Duchess Olga Nikolaevna, Grand Duchess Tatiana Nikolaevna, Grand Duchess Maria Nikolaevna, Grand Duchess Anastasia Nikolaevna, and Tsarevich Alexei Nikolaevich. She lived with the family in the Alexander Palace in Tsarskoye Selo, occupying the thirty-first room on the second floor. In her room she had paintings by Vasily Volkov.

While many of the attendants in the service of the Empress spoke English, Tegleva was instructed to speak Russian with the children. She was assisted by a maid named Anna Yakovlevna Utkina.

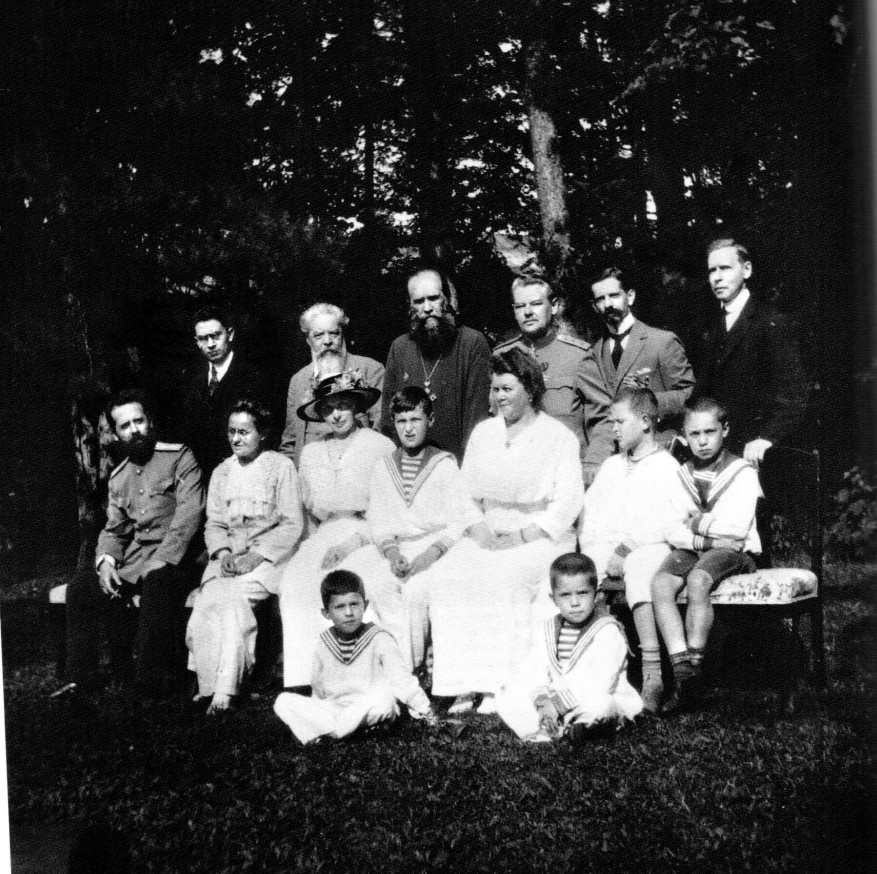
Standing left to right: footman Zhuravski, Terenty Ivanovich Chemodurov, Vasiliev, Petrov, Pierre Gilliard, Charles Sydney Gibbes. Second line: Vladimir Derevenko, Elizaveta Ersberg, Alexandra Tegleva, Tsarevich Alexei Nikolaevich, Maria Gustavna Tutelberg, Kolya Derevenko, Alexei Derevenko, Alexandr Derevenko, and Sergei Derevenko; Tsarskoe Selo in 1916.

In 1904, Empress Alexandra gave Tegleva a gold pocket watch made by Swiss manufacturer Paul Buhre as a Christmas present. The watch was engraved with the inscription Given by the Sovereign Empress on 24 December 1904. Tegleva was awarded a Fabergé brooch, bearing the Romanov family crest embellished with a diamond and four rubies, in 1913 on the occasion of the Romanov Tercentenary.

=== Exile with the Imperial family ===
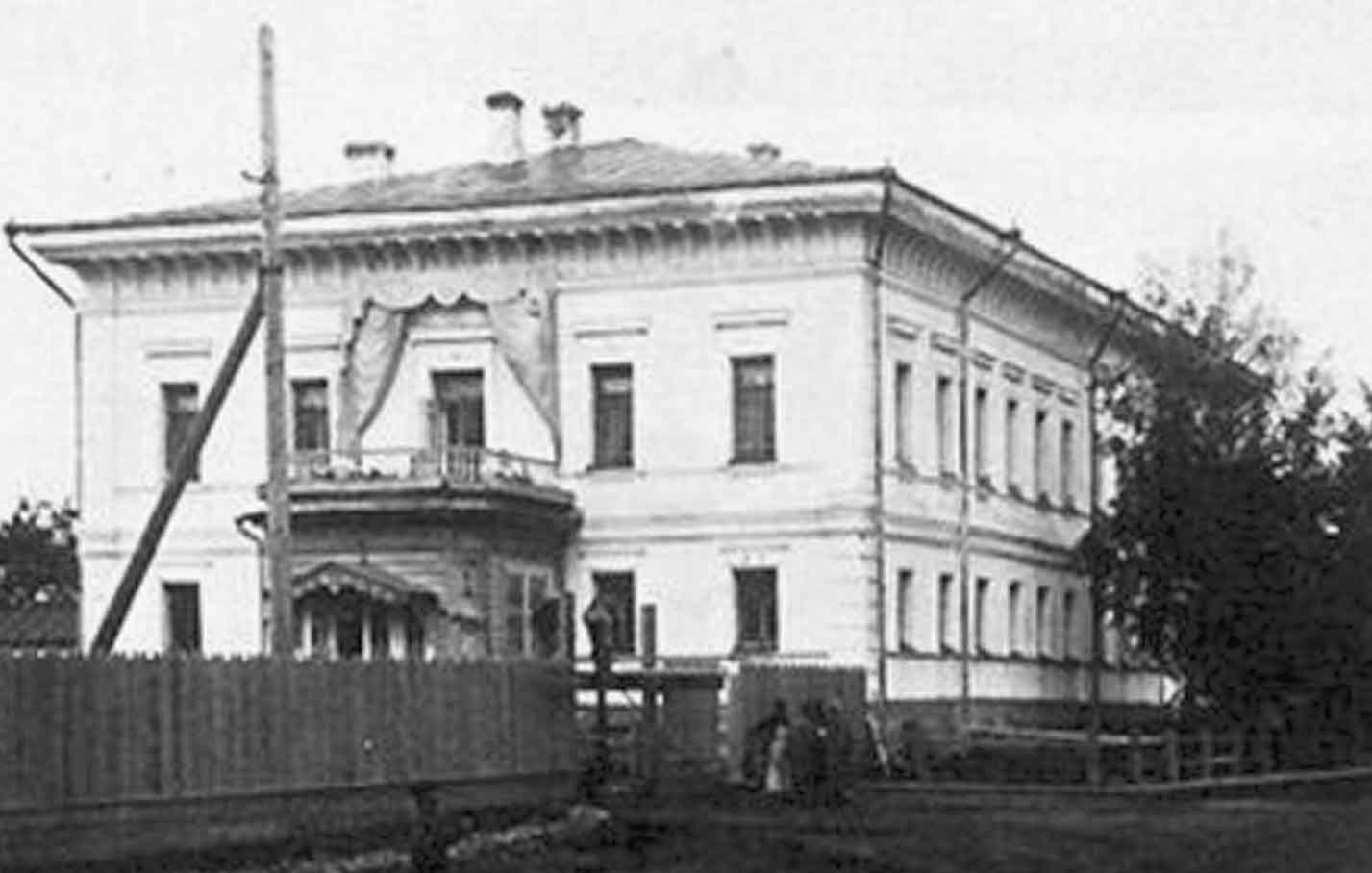
The Governor's Mansion in Tobolsk, where Tegleva lived with the Imperial family under house arrest

Following the abdication of Nicholas II during the February Revolution, Tegleva went with the imperial family into exile in Western Siberia and lived with them under house arrest at the Governor's Mansion in Tobolsk. Unlike many other members of the imperial household, Tegleva left many of her personal belongings at the Alexander Palace upon going into exile, including fine clothes, photographs with fellow staff, photographs with the imperial family, shoes, socks, and mementos given to her by the children. After the October Revolution in 1917, she stayed with the Grand Duchesses Tatiana, Olga, and Anastasia and the Tsarevich while the family were separated and the emperor and empress, as well as Grand Duchess Maria, were taken to the Ipatiev House in Yekaterinburg in April 1918. During this time one of the Empress's ladies in waiting, Anna Demidova, wrote to Tegleva to give her instructions on how to conceal family jewels in the Grand Duchesses' undergarments so that they would not be found when the family went through searches. She was assisted in hiding the jewels by the parlor maid Elizaveta Ersberg and lady's maid Maria Gustavna Tutelberg. In May 1918 the rest of the imperial family was taken to Ipatiev House, but Tegleva was not allowed to enter with them. Tegleva was detained with Pierre Gilliard, Charles Sydney Gibbes, and Baroness Sophie Karlovna von Buxhoeveden in a separate residence from the imperial family in Yekaterinburg. She was almost killed by the Bolsheviks in Tyumen but was freed by the White Army.

== Later life ==
When Nikolai Sokolov, a legal investigator for the Omsk Regional Court, was assigned by Admiral Alexander Kolchak to investigate the execution of the Romanov family in 1919, Tegleva and other members of the Romanov entourage were interviewed.

In 1919 she married Swiss academic Pierre Gilliard, who had worked with her in the imperial household as the children's tutor. She survived the Russian Revolution, arriving in Lausanne, Switzerland, in 1920 as a white émigré.

Tegleva worked with her husband to investigate and debunk the claims made by Anna Anderson, a Romanov impostor who pretended to be Grand Duchess Anastasia Nikolaevna. On her second visit to Anderson in St. Mary's Hospital in Berlin in 1925, Anderson mistook Tegleva for Grand Duchess Olga Alexandrovna. On another visit, Anderson asked Tegleva to moisten her forehead with eau de Cologne, a comforting gesture Tegleva used to do for Grand Duchess Anastasia as her nursemaid. The interaction left Tegleva feeling shaken. Ultimately, she and her husband believed Anderson to be a fraud, although Tegleva felt an immense love for Anderson as she had for Grand Duchess Anastasia.

Tegleva was the godmother of her niece, Marie-Claude Gilliard Knecht.

She died in Switzerland in 1955.

== In popular culture ==
Tegleva is portrayed by Katharine Schofield in the 1971 British film Nicholas and Alexandra. She was portrayed by Michele Valence in the play Daughter of A Soldier performed at the Theatre of the Open Eye in New York in 1988. She is also a character in the play The Anastasia Trials in the Court of Women: An Interactive Comedy in Two Acts, written by Carolyn Gage and Don Nigro. She was portrayed by Milda Noreikaite in the 2019 Netflix documentary drama The Last Czars.

== Citations ==
- Rappaport, Helen. Four Sisters: The Lost Lives of the Romanov Grand Duchesses. Pan Macmillan, 2014. ISBN 978-1-4472-5935-0
