= Vladimir Derevenko =

Russian surgeon (1879–1936)

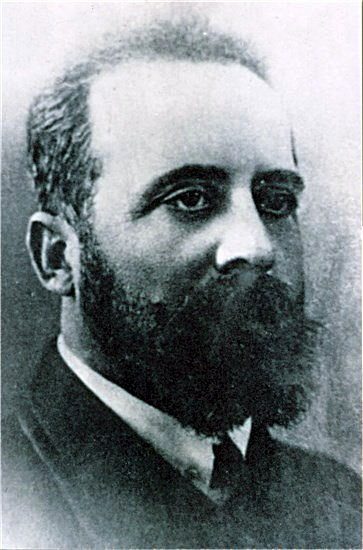
Photograph of Derevenko, before 1920

Vladimir Nikolaevich Derevenko (Russian: Владимир Николаевич Деревенко; 1879–1936) was a Russian and Soviet medical doctor and surgeon who served at the court of Emperor Nicholas II of Russia.

== Time with the Romanovs ==
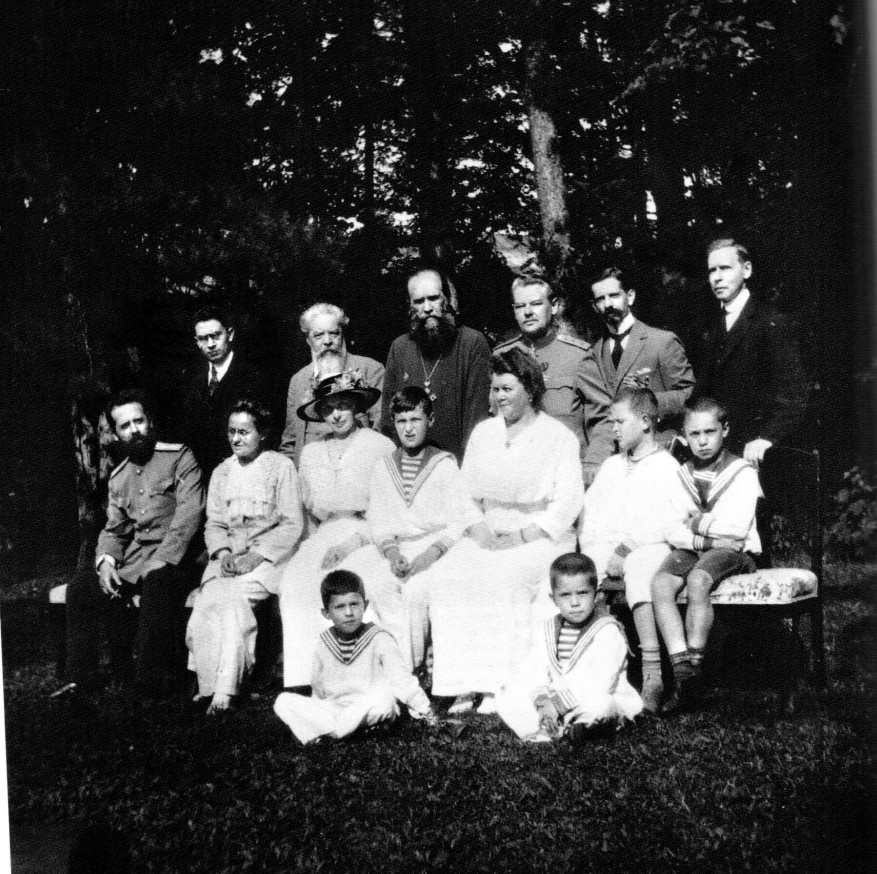
Standing left to right: footman Zhuravski, Terenty Ivanovich Chemodurov, Vasiliev, Petrov, Pierre Gilliard, Charles Sydney Gibbes. Second line: Vladimir Derevenko, Elizaveta Ersberg, Alexandra Tegleva, Tsarevich Alexei Nikolaevich, Maria Gustavna Tutelberg, Kolya Derevenko, Alexei Derevenko, Alexandr Derevenko, and Sergei Derevenko; Tsarskoe Selo in 1916.

Before the revolution, Derevenko was a physician who served at the court of the last Tsar, Nicholas II. He was a specialist doctor assigned to look after the Tsarevich in 1912, who suffered from haemophilia. His son, Kolya Derevenko, was a friend of Alexei. Nicholas II abdicated in March 1917 and was exiled with his family to the Siberian village of Tobolsk that August, a journey on which Derevenko and his family voluntarily embarked. In May 1918 the Derevenkos accompanied the Imperial family to the Siberian city of Yekaterinburg. Like many others, they were prohibited from staying with the Romanovs inside the Ipatiev House. Instead they stayed in a house across the street, though Derevenko was occasionally allowed to treat Nicholas's son, Alexei Nikolaevich. Early in the morning of 17 July 1918 the former Imperial family and four retainers were murdered by order of the Bolshevik government.

== After the Romanovs ==
One week after the murders, Yekaterinburg fell to the anti-Bolshevik White Army. As the civil war reached its climax. Derevenko and his family remained in Yekaterinburg, where he practised medicine and aided White investigators in their inquiry into the Imperial family's murder. When the Bolshevik Red Army recaptured the city in late 1918, Derevenko moved his family to the White Army stronghold of Perm, where he taught at Perm University's hospital. The Bolsheviks regained the city the next year and the Derevenkos again relocated, this time to Tomsk, where he became head of the district military hospital.

He was arrested by the NKVD in the early 1930s and executed in 1936 during the Great Purge.

== In literature and drama ==
Derevenko features as a character in the play, Ekaterinburg about the time in captivity of the Romanovs and their retainers inside the Ipatiev House in Ekaterinburg.
