= Terenty Ivanovich Chemodurov =

Russian butler

Terenty Ivanovich Chemodurov (1849 – 1919), was a Russian servant. He was the personal butler of Tsar Nicholas II of Russia from December 1 (14), 1908; he voluntarily followed the Imperial Family into exile and accompanied the Sovereign during his transfer from Tobolsk to Yekaterinburg. He is known as a witness of the imprisonment of the former Russian Imperial Family in Yekaterinburg.

He was held at the Ipatiev House, Yekaterinburg, until 11 (24) May, 1918, when he was removed due to the wish of Nicholas II stated in his diary – "decided to let my old man Chemodurov go to rest". According to Chemodurov himself (testimony given on 2-3 (15-16) August 1918 to the Member of the Yekaterinburg District Court Iv. Sergeev) upon release he was then confined in the Yekaterinburg prison: "On May 11/24, I was taken from the Ipatiev House not to the railway station but to prison, where I remained in confinement until July 5." (note: 5 July is most likely Old Style and is 18 July 1918 New Style).

== In his own words – quote from his testimony to the Member of the Yekaterinburg District Court Iv. Sergeev ==
"On December 1, 1908, I entered the service of the Palace Administration—specifically the Office of the Grand Marshal of the Court—as a valet to the former Sovereign Emperor Nicholas Alexandrovich, a position I held until quite recently. Prior to that, I had served for 19 years as a valet to Grand Duke Alexei Alexandrovich, remaining in his service until the day of his death. There were three valets serving the former Sovereign: myself, Pyotr Fedorovich Kotov, and Nikita Kuzmich Teterevyatnikov; we took turns serving the former Sovereign on a weekly basis. The duties of the valet on duty included, in addition to routine tasks, carrying out all the Sovereign’s personal orders and announcing any persons who had personal access to him; no one—with the exception of the Sovereign’s wife and children—was permitted to enter the Sovereign’s study without being announced by the valet. During my nearly ten years of service to the Sovereign, I became well acquainted with his habits and inclinations in his private life, and I can say in good conscience that the former Tsar was a devoted family man."

== Biography ==
Terenty Ivanovich Chemadurov was born in 1849. (His surname is often spelled "Chemodurov," but this is incorrect.) He came from a peasant family in the village of Krupets, Krupets Volost, Putivl Uyezd, Kursk Governorate.

He was married to Ekaterina Andreevna, with whom he had a daughter, also named Ekaterina, born on 19 November, 1891.

Like most servants who later served at the Imperial Court, T.I. Chemadurov most likely began his military service in one of the Life-Guard regiments; there, he caught the eye of Grand Duke Alexei Alexandrovich—the fourth son of Emperor Alexander II and the last General-Admiral of the Imperial Russian Navy—and was invited to enter his service. He was appointed to the service of His Imperial Highness Grand Duke Alexei Alexandrovich as a waiter on 6 January, 1891. On 1 January, 1895, he was appointed to the position of Reitknecht (groom/riding attendant). T.I. Chemadurov performed his duties in an exemplary manner; upon the Grand Duke's recommendation, he was nominated for the Silver Medal "For Diligence," which was awarded to him by Imperial command in 1897.

On 1 May, 1898, T.I. Chemadurov was appointed to the position of "Acting Valet." He evidently handled these new responsibilities very well, too; in 1901, he was nominated for the Gold Medal "For Diligence," and on 20 May, 1906, he was elevated to the rank of Personal Honorary Citizen. For more than 17 years, T.I. Chemadurov served in the personal retinue of the Grand Duke and was discharged from service only after the latter's death, effective November 1, 1908. However, the devoted servant was not forgotten. Exactly one month later—with the Sovereign's permission and pursuant to Order No. 55 of the Court Marshal’s Department of the Ministry of the Imperial Court and Domains, dated 1 December, 1908—Terenty Chemadurov was appointed a supernumerary Valet to His Imperial Majesty; he was subsequently enrolled in a regular staff position of the same title on November 23, 1910. For many years, T.I. Chemadurov accompanied the Sovereign on all his journeys, serving him faithfully and loyally; in recognition of this service, he was granted the rank of Hereditary Honorary Citizen on 6 April, 1914.

With the outbreak of the First World War, T.I. Chemadurov continued to accompany the Sovereign on his travels; for his "special efforts in attending to His Imperial Majesty's journeys to the Active Army," he was awarded the Gold Neck Medal "For Diligence" in 1915 and the Order of St. Stanislaus, 3rd Class, in 1916.

Following the February Upheaval, Terenty Chemadurov—along with other servants who refused to abandon their Sovereign—remained at the Alexander Palace; on 1 August, 1917, he followed the Imperial Family to Tobolsk. For his long and unblemished service, T.I. Chemadurov was awarded:

- The Silver Medal "For Diligence" for wear on the chest, suspended from the Order of St. Stanislaus ribbon (2 January, 1897); – Gold Medal "For Diligence" (for wear on the chest on the Order of St. Stanislaus ribbon) (20 May, 1901);
- Light Bronze Medal "In Commemoration of the 300th Anniversary of the Reign of the House of Romanov" (21 February, 1913);
- Gold Medal "For Diligence" (for wear around the neck on the Order of St. Stanislaus ribbon) (6 May, 1915);
- Order of St. Stanislaus, 3rd Class (6 December, 1916);
- Prussian General Honor Cross (15 March, 1914);
- Hessian Silver Cross (15 March, 1914);

He was discharged from service due to the abolition of the Court Marshal’s Department, pursuant to an order by the People's Commissar of State Property V.A. Karelin dated 15 January, 1918, and was granted a one-time severance payment of 650 rubles.

On 17 (30) April, 1918, T.I. Chemadurov arrived in Yekaterinburg with the Imperial Family; there, along with other captives, he was placed under arrest at the Ipatiev House (the "House of Special Purpose"). He lived alongside the Imperial Family under arrest until 11 (24) May, 1918.

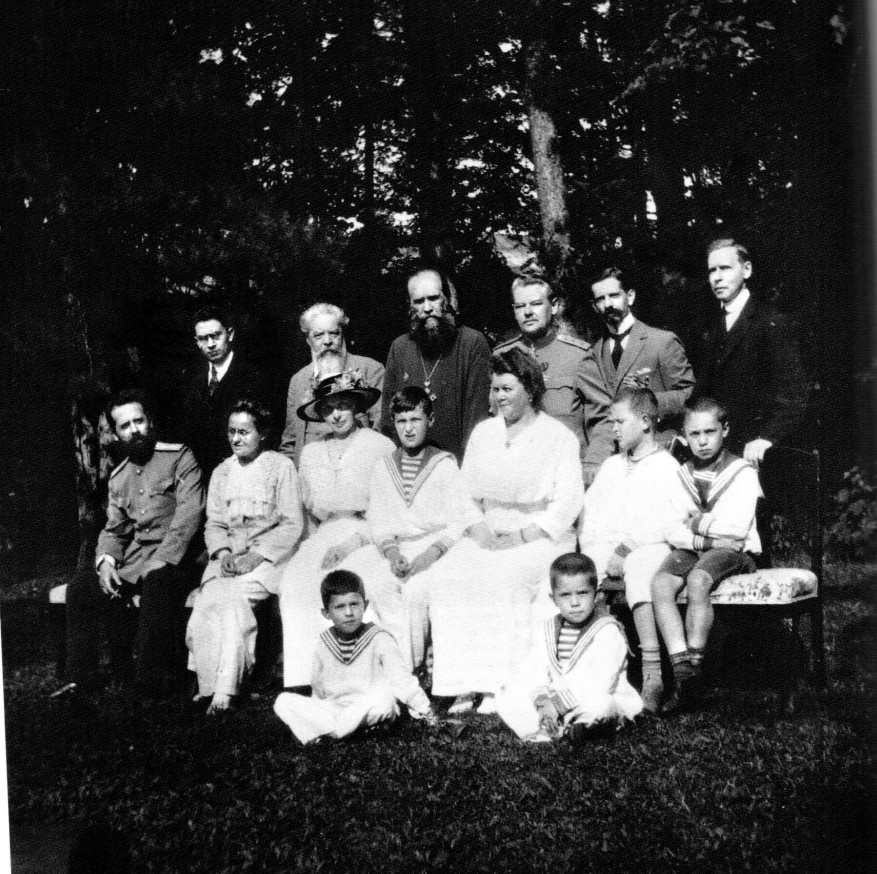
Standing left to right: footman Zhuravski, Terenty Ivanovich Chemodurov, Vasiliev, Petrov, Pierre Gilliard, Charles Sydney Gibbes. Second line: Vladimir Derevenko, Elizaveta Ersberg, Alexandra Tegleva, Tsarevich Alexei Nikolaevich, Maria Gustavna Tutelberg, Kolya Derevenko, Alexei Derevenko, Alexandr Derevenko, and Sergei Derevenko; Tsarskoe Selo in 1916.
