= Tatishchev =

Tatishchev may refer to:

- Tatishchev family, a Russian noble family
- Dmitry Tatishchev (1767–1845), Russian diplomat and art collector
- Vasily Tatishchev (1686–1750), Russian Imperial statesman, historian, philosopher, and ethnographer
- 4235 Tatishchev, a minor planet
