= Sophie Buxhoeveden =

Russian lady-in-waiting (1883–1956)

Sophie von Buxhoeveden
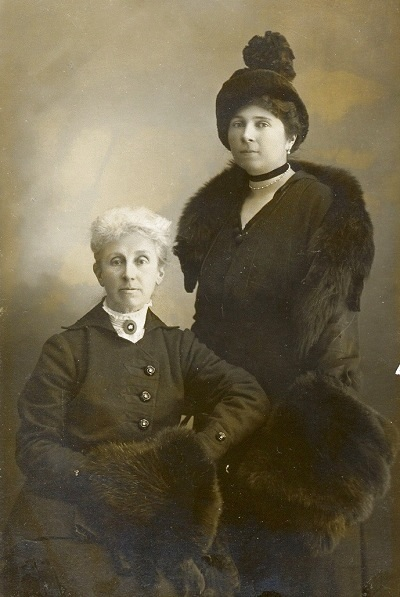
- Baroness von Buxhoeveden (right) with her mother Lyudmila (left), 1910s
- Born: September 6, 1883; St. Petersburg, Russia
- Died: November 26, 1956 (aged 73); England
- Parent(s): Karlos von Buxhoeveden; Lyudmila Osokina

Sophie Freiin von Buxhoeveden (Russian: София Карловна Буксгевден, romanized: Sofiya Karlovna Buksgevden; 18 September [O.S. 6 September] 1883 – November 26, 1956), also known as Baroness Sophie Buxdoeveden, was a Russian lady-in-waiting of Baltic German descent in service to Empress Alexandra of Russia. She was the author of three memoirs about the imperial family and about her own escape from Russia.

In her book Before the Storm, Sophie describes a side of old Russia seldom seen elsewhere, a family in the old-fashioned provincial country life of the gentry in the years before the revolution. As a child, Sophie shared picnics and mushroom hunts with other famous players in the story such as Anna Vyrubova, Felix Yussupov, Dmitri Pavlovich and the sons of poet Konstantin Romanov.

== Early life ==
According to her memoirs, Buxhoeveden's father, Baron Karlos Matthias Konstantin Ludwig Otto von Buxhoeveden (1856–1935), was the Russian minister in Copenhagen, Denmark during World War I. Her mother was Lyudmila Petrovna Osokina (1858–1917).

== Lady-in-waiting ==
In her youth, she was a part of the social life of St. Petersburg. Buxhoeveden was chosen as an honorary Lady in Waiting to the Tsarina in 1904, and became an official Lady in Waiting in 1913. She was nicknamed "Isa" by the Tsarina and her four daughters and, during World War I, was often chosen by the Tsarina to accompany the four grand duchesses to official duties.

She had no time for Grigori Rasputin, but witnessed his miracles first-hand and was baffled by his powers. Alexandra would have liked her to accept Rasputin as a holy man, but knew Buxhoeveden's opinion was not likely to be changed. The fact she kept her negative opinion to herself was appreciated by the Empress, who knew Buxhoeveden would say nothing to discredit her.

She followed the family to exile in Siberia following the Russian Revolution of 1917. She was released by the Bolsheviks, unlike many of the other people in the family's entourage, most likely because they mistook her Danish name for Swedish (she was Baltic German) and assumed she was a foreign national. The Bolsheviks did not imprison foreign nationals in fear of reprisals from other nations. Sophie spent many months on the run across Siberia, with other members of the royal household, including Gibbes, Alexandra Tegleva, and Gilliard. She was only allowed safe passage out of Russia when she made it to Omsk, which was then under the control of the Russian White Army and the British Military. Her experiences can be read in her book "Left Behind."

== Exile, death and legacy ==
After being refused permission to join the family in the Ipatiev House, Sophie, along with the foreign tutors, Pierre Gilliard and Sydney Gibbes, and attendants Alexandra Tegleva and Elizaveta Ersberg, lodged in a fourth class railway car while they tried to find a way to help the family. Every day, the three of them badgered Thomas Preston, the British consul, discussing all possible options. She and her two companions even made personal representations to the Ural Soviet on behalf of the Romanovs. These attempts failed and they were forced to leave Ekaterinburg.

Following many long months of fleeing across Siberia in fear for her life, Buxhoeveden was finally able to leave Russia with the help of the British military, namely General Alfred Knox, who got her safe passage on a military train. While in Omsk she had a surprise reunion with Joy, Alexei's spaniel, who had been rescued by Colonel Paul Rodzianko. Though now almost blind, the dog seemed to recognize her. Joy had been traumatized by the loss of the family, and was heartbroken. It was a sad but bittersweet reunion for her too; seeing the dog brought back vivid memories of the Tsarevich.

From Omsk, they had to travel across China to avoid unsafe parts of Siberia. Upon reaching Vladivostok, she described it as "Vladivostok, being the base of the Allied forces, was full of foreigners. There was the military element as well as representatives of the various Red Cross units, some Canadian detachments that had never gone any farther, as well as civilians and diplomats." She also described seeing the Pacific coast for the first time in her life, and expressed her sadness as she sailed away from her native country:

"I was leaving Russia. Would I ever see my country again, and in what condition would I find it if I ever returned? Who among my friends and relations would have survived the storm? The Russia I had known, the old Russia, disappeared slowly from view."

After she passed through Japan and Hawaii, regretting not having more time to see these places, her ship landed in San Francisco, where she took a train across the United States. She marveled at the sights she had never seen before:

"Everything in America seemed to me on such a monumental scale that it dwarfed every bit of European scenery I had ever seen before, or have ever seen since. What were the Norwegian fjords, or even the Alps, after the Rocky Mountains? What are the largest buildings of other towns after those in San Francisco and New York?"

When she finally arrived in Denmark at the home of her father, she told of seeing the Dowager Empress in Copenhagen, and how melancholy it was to hear "God Save the Tsar" played, knowing what had happened to the country she had loved.

"Was this to be the last time that they would hear that hymn? The Empire had been wiped out, the Emperor was no more, our great country had lost even its name. In the notes of our anthem was the echo of one of the world's greatest tragedies. It seemed to set a seal on a past that for us was gone... gone forever."

In exile, Buxhoeveden lived in Copenhagen with her father, then at Hemmelmark in northern Germany, the estate owned by Prince Heinrich of Prussia, younger brother of Kaiser Wilhelm II, and his wife, Princess Irene, the Tsarina's sister.

Finally at Kensington Palace in London, Baroness Buxhoeveden faithfully performed lady-in-waiting services for the late Tsarina's older sister Victoria, Marchioness of Milford Haven. It is quite incorrectly claimed, without any historical verification, that the Baroness was not trusted by the Tsar's sister, Grand Duchess Xenia Alexandrovna of Russia, who warned Victoria that "Isa" was not to be trusted. The truth of the matter was revealed through a statement made in March 1958 by Grand Duchess Xenia that she believed in her. "Isa" died in England in grace and favor rooms granted to her by the Queen, the drawers chests were crammed with mementos of the family, photo albums and pieces of Fabergé.

After her death she left a number of items that had belonged to the Russian imperial family to Grand Duchess Xenia including, "a green enamel Fabergé pencil given to me by Empress Alexandra ... a white china cup with a pattern of cornflowers and the mark NII used by the Emperor at Tobolsk .. a small wooden Ikon .. with a few words of prayer written by the Empress at Tobolsk ... ".

== Allegations of betrayal of the Romanovs ==
Amateur historians, usually Anna Anderson supporters, have accused her of betraying the family by taking money from them and later informing their guards that the Romanov children had sewn jewels into their clothing. This was based on a claim by Anderson that Buxhoeveden, after she denounced Anderson as a fraud pretending to be Grand Duchess Anastasia, had betrayed the family. She allegedly told Rodionov that "The buttons on her coat aren't buttons, they are diamonds; the aigrette of that hat conceals a diamond from the shah of Persia; and that belt there – underneath it are ropes of pearls.

Such a proposition has been completely disproven since the Bolsheviks had no idea the jewels were in the clothes until after the execution. Yurovsky stated "They shot the daughters but nothing happened, then Yermakov set the bayonet in motion and that didn't help; then they were finally finished off by being shot the head. Only in the forest did I discover what hampered the shooting of the daughters." According to King and Wilson, Yurovsky wrote in his 1922 memoirs about "the damn valuables and jewels we knew they had concealed in their clothes when they arrived, which caused troubles to no end."

It is fact that Yurovsky explained that while the truck was stuck in the forest, "some of Yermakov's people started to pull at the girls' blouses, where they discovered the valuables.".."Things that had been sewn into the daughters' clothing were discovered when the bodies began to be undressed..The daughters had bodices made up of diamonds and other precious stones that served not just as a receptacle for valuables but as protective armor. This is why neither bullets nor bayonets yielded results during the shooting and bayonet blows..there turned out to be eighteen pounds of such valuables." One of the large diamonds that had been carefully covered and concealed in a button was never discovered by the Bolsheviks, and was later found by the Whites trampled into the mud at the grave site after they took Ekaterinburg. The diamond was identified by two former servants who had helped the Grand Duchesses sew the jewels into the clothing.

King and Wilson allege that Buxhoeveden borrowed 1,300 rubles from the Romanov children's tutor Charles Sydney Gibbes to escape Russia. It is claimed she told him she would return the money, but never did. "I knew she was greedy, but I never knew she'd go that far!" Gibbes allegedly wrote to the French tutor Pierre Gilliard. Others said that Sophie's apparent poverty, as described by Gilliard and Gibbes, is proof she never had any money and certainly had not stolen anything from anyone. At her own admission, Sophie's rooms had been searched, and nothing of value had been found.

One source of the allegations blaming her with theft from the family was Boris Soloviev, the true guilty party. He was the husband of Maria Rasputin, author of historically disproven books, having married her to gain the trust of Rasputin supporters who were financing a plot to rescue the Romanovs. It was he who betrayed the family, and attempted to cast doubt on others. Soloviev really was involved in a scheme to defraud the family of the money sent by supporters to rescue them, and betray the rescuers to the Bolsheviks. The maid Anna Romanova was an accomplice of Soloviev. Romanova, said by some to have joined Buxhoeveden in the alleged 'betrayal' over the jewels and was supposedly interrogated in on the subject in Ekaterinburg, actually never even made the trip and stayed in Tobolsk.

== Involvement in the Anna Anderson affair ==
In 1922, in Berlin, a woman, later known to the world as Anna Anderson, was reportedly claiming to be a Romanov Grand Duchess. It was said that she was Grand Duchess Tatiana. She claimed, however, according to nurse Thea Malinovski to be Grand Duchess Anastasia in the fall of 1921. Baroness Buxhoeveden went to Berlin to visit the woman and pronounced her "too short" to be Tatiana.

She was in bed close to the wall, she was turned facing against the window, in full sunlight. When she heard us enter the room, she hid herself under the cover to hide herself from our stares, and we were not able to get her to show us her face....The unknown one spoke German with Miss Peuthert. Although she was permitted to get up, she preferred to stay in bed as long as possible. This is how I found her. After asking my companions to move away from the bed a little, I tried to attract the young woman's attention as I caressed her hair and speaking to her in English while using the types of phrases I would have used while speaking with the Grand Duchesses, but I did not refer to her by any name other than 'Darling'. She did not reply and I saw that she did not understand a word of what I had said, for when she raised the cover after a certain period of time, and I saw her face, there was nothing in her eyes which showed she had recognized me. The eyes and forehead showed some resemblance to the Grand Duchess Tatiana Nicolaievna, resemblance that disappeared, nevertheless, as soon as her face was not covered. I had to remove the cover by force, and I saw that neither the nose, the mouth, nor the chin were formed like that of the Grand Duchess. The hair was lighter in color, some of her teeth were missing-and the remaining ones were not like those of the Grand Duchess ... Her hands were also completely different, the fingers were longer and the nails narrower. I wanted to measure her height, but she refused, and I found it impossible to get an exact measurement without force. We judged roughly that in any case, she was smaller than me, while the Grand Duchess Tatiana was more than ten centimeters taller than me. I have been able to verify this, thanks to the patient's official measurement at the time of her arrival at the hospital and that corresponded exactly with the one which was taken in my presence.

I tried to awaken the memory of the young woman by all the possible means; I showed to her an 'icon', with the date of the Romanov jubilee, that the emperor had given to some persons of the suite, after that a ring that had belonged to the empress; the latter had been given to her in the presence of the Grand Duchess Tatiana. But none of these things seemed to evoke in her the slightest recognition. She remained completely indifferent, she whispered some incomprehensible words into Ms. Peuthert's ear. Although I noted a certain similarity in the upper part of the face with the unknown—currently Mrs. Tschaikovski—with the Grand Duchess Tatiana, I am sure that she is not her. I later learned that the she supposes that she is the Grand Duchess Anastasia, but she does not physically resemble her in the least. She has none of the special characteristics that would allow any one who knew the Grand Duchess Anastasia well to identify her.

— Pierre Gilliard

It was after that Anderson mentioned Buxhoevden's alleged treachery and betrayal of the family to the Bolsheviks, claiming that was why she denied her. Except among diehard supporters, this vicious counter-attack did little to cushion the blow of having been flatly rejected by someone who was very close to the Imperial family. Sophie Buxhoeveden never wavered in her view that Anderson was an impostor.

Baroness Buxhoeveden was also involved in disproving another Romanov claimant, this time Eugenia Smith, who claimed to be Grand Duchess Anastasia. She wrote about Smith, "I found no likeness whatsoever to the Grand Duchess physically.... Although a total stranger, she is sympathetic on the whole, but seemed to be labouring under a mental delusion."

== Writings ==
The Baroness wrote three books that are considered to give one of the best accounts of the Romanov family's life and final days. They were Life and Tragedy of Alexandra Feodorovna, published in 1928; Left Behind: Fourteen Months in Siberia During the Revolution, published in 1929; and Before the Storm.
