= Teglev family =

Russian noble family

Teglev
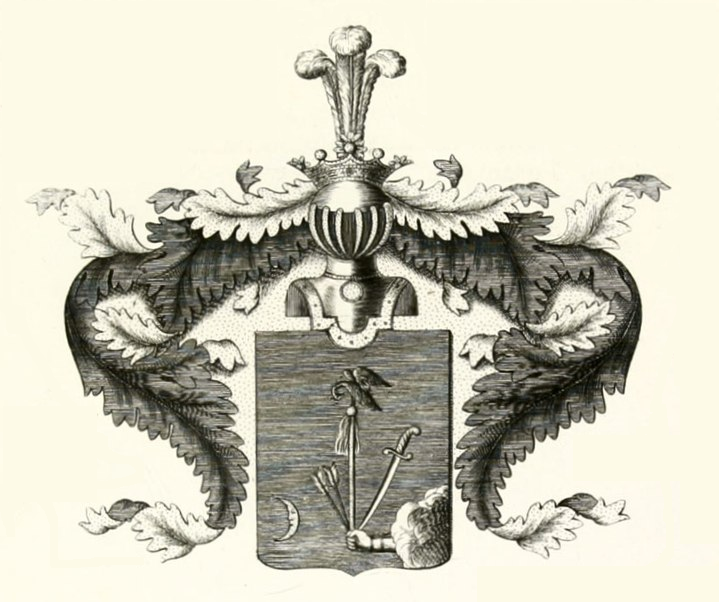
- Coat of Arms of the Teglevs
- Country: Grand Duchy of Moscow; Tsardom of Russia; Russian Empire
- Origin: Great Horde

The Teglev family is an old Russian noble family which can trace its line back to 15th century.

== History ==
The family descends from Yuri Tegl, the great-grandson of an attendant of Vasily II of Moscow. The family were added to the nobility of the Grand Duchy of Moscow in the seventeenth century.

The coat of arms of the Tyeglev family is included in the second part of the General Armorial of the Noble Families of the Russian Empire.

== Notable family members ==
- Alexandra Tegleva (1894–1955), Nursemaid to the imperial family
- Alexey Vasilievich Teglev (1791-1854), Rear-Admiral of the Imperial Russian Navy
- Semyon Matveevich Teglev (ru:Теглев, Семён Матвеевич; 1771–1849), Sculptor and archivist of the Imperial Academy of Arts

== Sources ==
- "Теглевы" . Brockhaus and Efron Encyclopedic Dictionary (in Russian). 1906.
