= Maria Gustavna Tutelberg =

Maid in the Russian Imperial Household

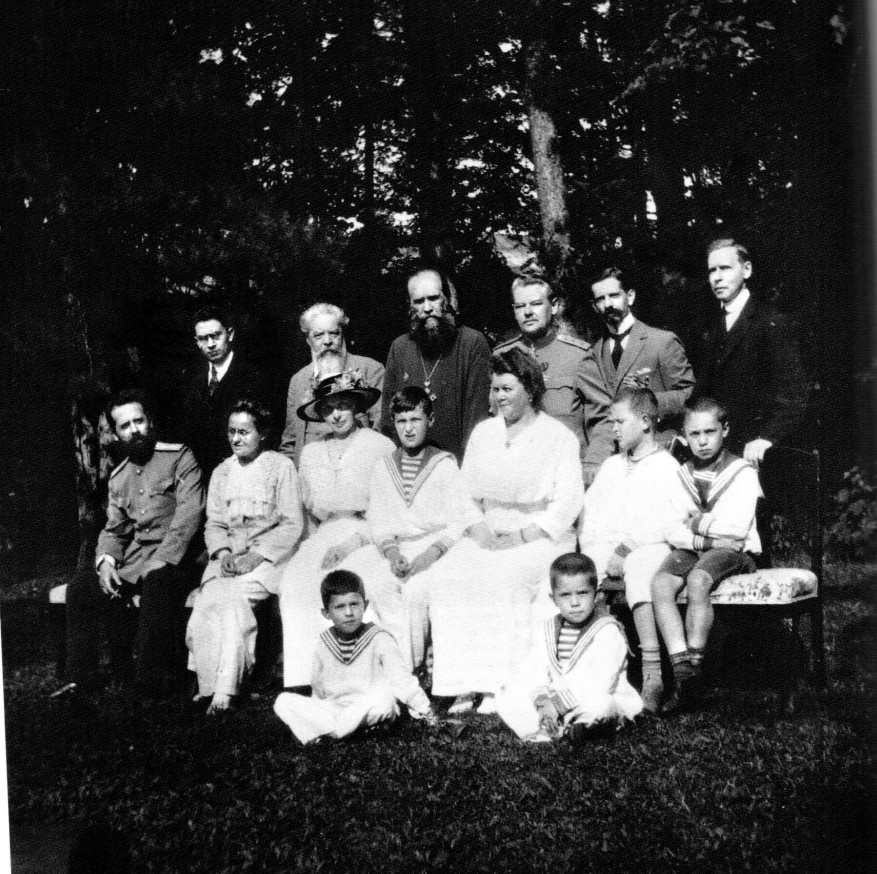
- Standing left to right: footman Zhuravski, valet Chemodurov, Vasiliev, Petrov, Gilliard, Gibbs. Second line: V.N. Derevenko, Elizaveta Ersberg, Alexandra Tegleva, Alexei, Maria Gustavna Tutelberg, Kolya Derevenko and botsman Derevenko's sons Alexei, Alrxandr, Sergei. Tsarskoe Selo 1916.
- Occupation: lady's maid

Maria Gustavna Tutelberg was a Baltic-German noblewoman who served as a chief maid to Empress Alexandra Feodorovna at the Alexander Palace. She was second lady's maid to the Empress, and served in the Imperial Household until the Imperial family's execution during the Russian Revolution.

== Biography ==
=== Imperial household ===
Tutelberg was from the Baltic region and was described by lady-in-waiting Anna Vyrubova as being a "rather slow and quiet girl". She was employed as a maid to Empress Alexandra Feodorovna. She lived in a room on the upper floor of the Alexander Palace, across from the rooms of the Grand Duchesses Olga, Tatiana, Maria, and Anastasia and the Tsarevich Alexei. Another palace maid, Madeleine Zanotti, hated Tutelberg but the two worked together to request not to wear caps and aprons while in service to the Empress. Empress Alexandra permitted them, as chief maids, to wear simple black gowns and ribbon bows in their hair. Tutelberg and Zanotti were assisted by three Russian undermaids.

Tutelberg was sceptical of Grigori Rasputin's abilities to heal Tsarevich Alexei Nikolaevich of his haemophilia, and expressed her doubts to the empress. Empress Alexandra responded to Tutelberg, saying: "Our Saviour chose his disciples among simple fishermen and carpenters, not among learned theologians. It is said in the Gospel that faith can move mountains... I believe that my son will rise. ... I know that people think me mad for my faith, but so did they think of the Martyrs."

=== Imprisonment with the imperial family ===
When the Imperial family was placed under house arrest during the Russian Revolution, they had to live on steamers while awaiting a house to be sent to. While living on the steamer, Tutelberg worked with Elizaveta Ersberg, Alexandra Tegleva, Anna Demidova, Count Ilya Leonidovich Tatischev, Anastasia Hendrikova, and Catherine Schneider to arrange the furniture. She lived with the family under arrest at Governor's Mansion in Tobolsk, occupying a room on the first floor under the main staircase. She accompanied the family to Ipatiev House in Yekaterinburg.

Tutelberg, along with Ersberg, were brought by the White Army into the woods where the Imperial family had been buried to help identify the relics. She and Ersberg had assisted in sewing up the bodices, buttons, and hats of the Grand Duchesses and knew which jewels belonged to which duchess.
