= Anna Demidova =

Russian lady's maid (1878–1918)

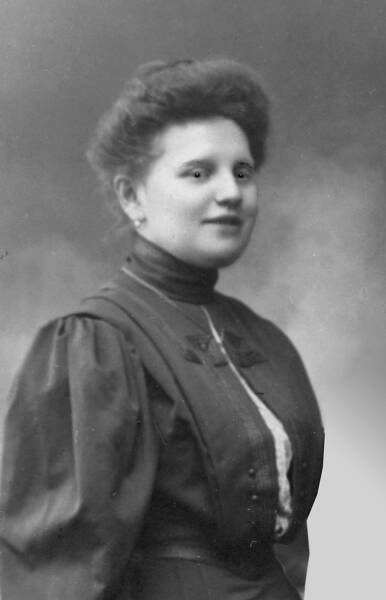
- Anna Demidova
- Born: 26 January 1878; Cherepovets, Russian Empire
- Died: 17 July 1918 (aged 40); Ipatiev House, Yekaterinburg, Russian Soviet Republic
- Cause of death: Murder
- Occupation: Lady's maid
- Parent: Stepan Demidov (father)

Anna Stepanovna Demidova (26 January 1878 – 17 July 1918) was a lady's maid in the service of Empress Alexandra of Russia. She stayed with the Romanov family when they were arrested, and was murdered together with Alexandra and the Romanov family on 17 July 1918.

She had shared the Romanov family's exile at Tobolsk and Ekaterinburg following the Russian Revolution of 1917 before their murder. She is remembered for staying with the Romanovs to the end.

== Life ==
Anna Demidova, whose nickname was "Nyuta," was described in adulthood as a "tall, statuesque blonde." She was the daughter of Stepan Demidov and his wife. Her father was a well-off merchant in Cherepovets, where he also served on the Cherepovets City Duma, and was a member of the House of Demidov, a Russian noble family. Demidova graduated from the Yaroslavl Institute for Maids with a teaching certificate.

She was a good friend of Elizaveta Ersberg, a parlormaid at the court, and was once engaged to Ersberg's brother Nikolai. About 1905 Ersberg secured her friend a position at the court as a governess. In his memoirs, Charles Sydney Gibbes, the Romanov children's English tutor, described Demidova as "of a singularly timid and shrinking disposition."

=== Exile and death ===
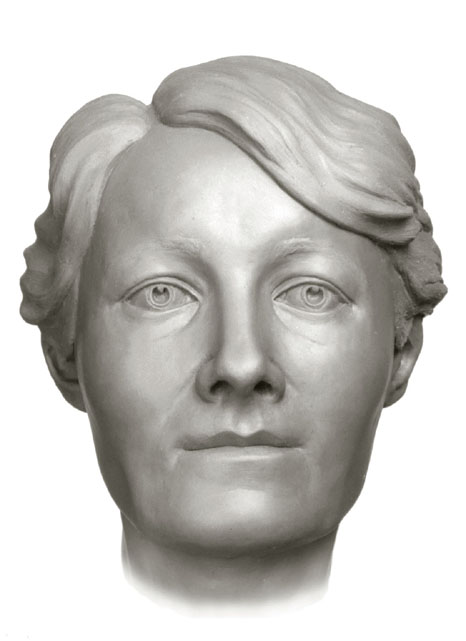
A forensic facial reconstruction of Anna Demidova by S.A. Nikitin, 1994.

Later Demidova began working more directly in service to Tsarina Alexandra and followed her into captivity. In April 1918, after the Russian Revolution, she accompanied her mistress, Tsar Nicholas II, and Grand Duchess Maria Nikolaevna of Russia when they were transferred by Bolsheviks from Tobolsk to Ekaterinburg. The remaining four Romanov children and other members of their retinue stayed behind in Tobolsk for a month because the Tsarevich Alexei was ill as a result of his hemophilia. As her group left Tobolsk, Demidova said to Gibbes, "I am so frightened of the Bolsheviks, Mr. Gibbes. I don't know what they will do to us."

On the night of the murders, the family was awakened and told to dress. Demidova carried two pillows into which gems had been sewn. After the first volley of fire by the firing squad, Demidova, who had fainted after being wounded, revived and, finding herself still alive, exclaimed "Thank God! God has saved me!" Hearing her, the killers turned on her. Crying, she attempted to defend herself, but was stabbed to death with bayonets.

== Discovery of remains ==
The Bolsheviks, followed by the Soviet Union government, tried to suppress information about the murders of the Romanov family and their retainers. In 1979 the gravesite containing most of the bodies was found by an amateur, but the government did not acknowledge this until 1989, in the period of glasnost. DNA analysis and forensics were used to identify the Romanov members.

The remains of Tsarevich Alexei and one of his sisters were missing from this gravesite, but were finally discovered in 2007 in another, nearby, unmarked gravesite. Their identities were confirmed by DNA analysis, but the Russian Orthodox Church asked to retain Alexei's remains for more testing and, as of 2015, still held them.

== Funeral ==
A state funeral was held on 17 July 1998, in Peter and Paul Cathedral in St. Petersburg for the Romanov family, Demidova, and the other victims killed by the Bolsheviks 80 years earlier. Demidova's grandniece, Natalie Demidova, was among the attendees. At the time, leaders of the Russian Orthodox Church did not attend because they disputed the identification of victims.

== Canonization ==
In 2000, the Russian Orthodox Church canonized all seven members of the Russian Imperial Family: Nicholas and Alexandra, and their five children. Demidova was under consideration for canonization as of 2016.

== In literature and drama ==
Demidova is featured as a character in the play, Ekaterinburg (2013) by D. Logan. It explores the time in captivity of the Romanovs and their retainers in the Ipatiev House in Ekaterinburg.

== See also ==
- Romanov sainthood
