= Tatishchev family =

Russian noble family

Tatishchev family Тати́щевы
- noble family
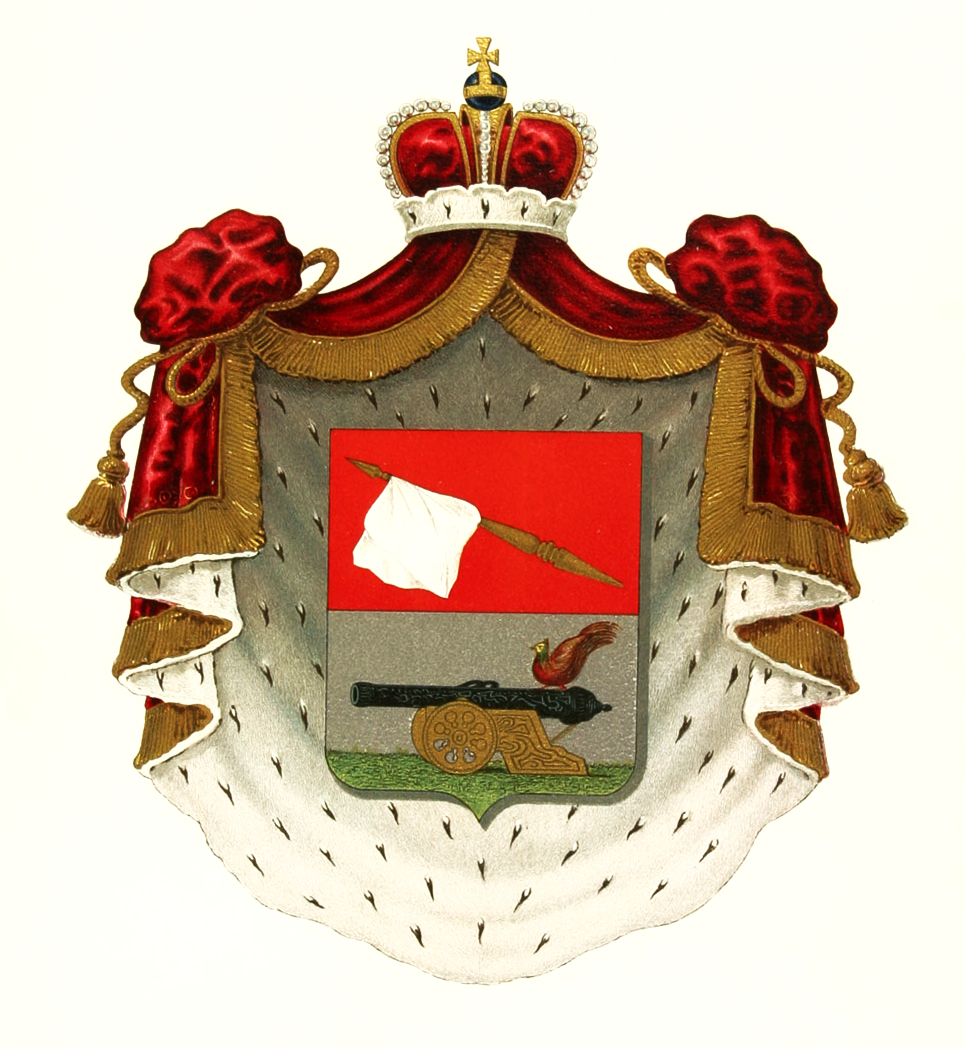
- Coat-of-arms of the Tatischev family (non-titled)
- Parent family: Rostislavichi of Smolensk
- Current region: Russia, France
- Origin: Principality of Smolensk
- Founded: 15th century
- Founder: Prince Vasily Yuryevich Tat-isch

The House of Tatischev or Tatishchev (Russian: Тати́щевы) is a Russian noble family traditionally believed to be descended from the Princes of Solomerech of the Rostislavichi of Smolensk. This version of the Tatischev family's genealogy had made it to the Velvet Book. A cadet branch of the family bears the title of counts. The Tatischevs are listed in the Parts 5 (titled nobility) and 6 (ancient nobility) of the genealogical books of Moscow, Tver, Tula, Kostroma, Penza and Saint-Petersburg governorates. From the four lineages of the family, the cadet one was granted the title of counts in 1801.

== History ==
According to the genealogical books, the progenitor of the Tatishchevs (Tatischevs) was Prince Vasily Yuryevich nicknamed Tat-isch (Russian: Тать-ищь), the son of Prince Yuri Ivanovich of Solomerech (Solomirsky), the son of Prince Ivan Dmitrievich Shah, the Prince of Solomerech, who served to Duke Ivan III. The family legend claims that Vasily Yuryevich was the viceroy of Duke Vasily I of Moscow at Veliky Novgorod in the early 1400s, but other sources do not mention him as the viceroy. The reliability of the Tatischevs' genealogy is disputed by some researchers.

In the 15th century, the Tatischevs did not play a significant role. In the late 1500s, Ignaty Tatischev was a prominent figure who had reached the office of the royal treasurer. Matvey Tatischev was a voivode at Gdov (1582 — 1584), Ivan Tatische — a voivode at Izborsk (1582), Mikhail Tatischev (d. 1609) was a yaselnichy (an assistant to the royal equerry) and a prominent figure of the Times of Troubles. Alexey Tatischev (d. 1760) was a general-in-chief. In the 18th — 19th centuries, the Tatischev family had produced a large number of generals, courtiers, governors and diplomats.

== Estates ==
- Tatischev Pogost, a village in the Rostovsky district, Yaroslavl Oblast.
- Nikolskoe-Sverchkovo, a village in the Klinsky district, Moscow Oblast.
- Troitskoe, a village near Klin, Moscow Oblast.
- Kritsy, a locality near the village of Zapolye, Plyussky district, Pskov Oblast.

== Notable members ==
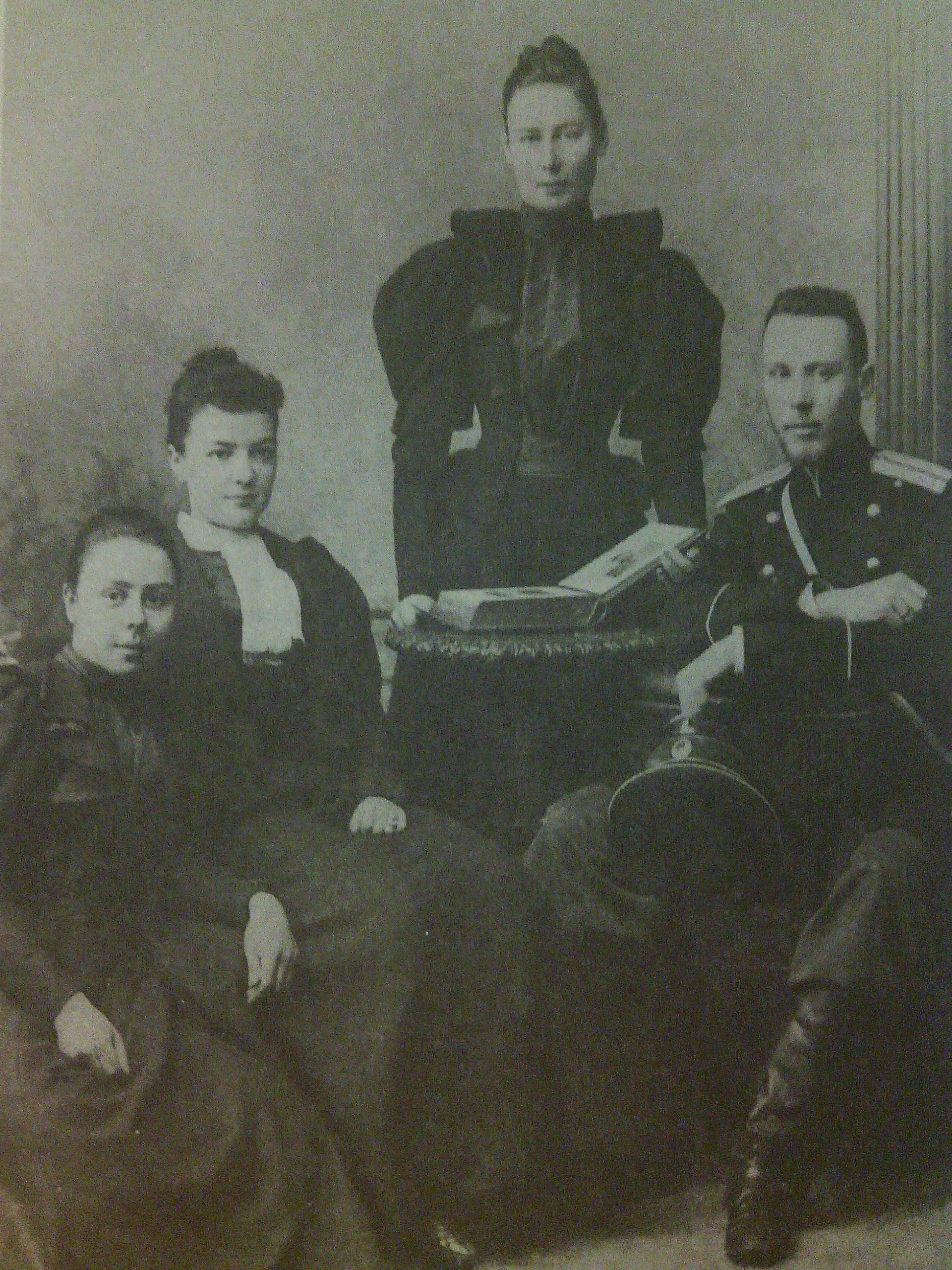
- Count Dmitry Tatishchev with his wife (second from left), and sisters Natalia and Nina (standing)
  Alexander Aleksandrovich Tatischev (1823—1895) was the governor of Penza (1872—1886).
- Count Alexander Ivanovich Tatischev (1763 — 1833) was a Russian general of the Infantry in the Napoleonic war. In 1826, received the title of count, but died childless.
- Alexey Danilovich Tatischev (1697 — 1760) was a Russian general-in-chief (the second highest class in the Table of Ranks), full chamberlain and a senator.
- Vasily Nikitich Tatischev (1686 — 1750) was a famous Russian historian.
- Dmitry Alexandrovich Tatischev (1824 — 1878) was a Russian major general, the head of the 5th Hussars Alexandra's Regiment (since 1861), the Grodno Hussar regiment of the Imperial Guard (1863 —1865) and the Emperor's Guard's Hussar Regiment (1865—1867).
- Count Dmitry Nikolayevich Tatischev (1867 — 1919) was a Russian lieutenant general (since 1916), the governor of Yaroslavl (1909—1915), the head of the Special Corps of Gendarmes (1915—1917).
- Dmitry Pavlovich Tatischev (1767 — 1845) was a Russian statesman, the senior chamberlain (ober-kammerherr), a member of the State Council, senator, an envoy extraordinary to Naples (1802—1803 and 1805—1808) and the plenipotentiary to Spain (1812—1821) and Austria (1822—1841). He was the first in Russia to have received the Order of the Golden Fleece.
- Jacques Tatischeff (1907 — 1982) was a French filmmaker. He was the grandson of General Dmitry Alexandrovich Tatischev (1824 — 1878).
- Count Ivan Dmitrievich Tatischev (1830—1913) was a Russian general of Infantry.
- Ivan Yuryevich Tatischev (1652—1730) was an associate of Peter the Great, voivode and the organizer of the first Russian Baltic shipyards.
- Ilya Leonidovich Tatischev (1859 — 1918) was an adjutant general of Nicolas II. In 1910—1914 he personally represented Tsar Nicolas II at the court of Emperor Wilhelm II. He did not abandon Tsar Nicolas II after the Revolution and followed his in exile. He was killed by Bolsheviks in Yekaterinburg in 1918. He was canonized in the Russian Orthodox Church.
- Mikhail Iganyevich Tatischev (d. 1609) was a Muscovite statesman and a diplomat. He was the leader of the embassy to Georgia to get the Kakhetian tsar Alexander II to alliage to Tsar Boris Gudonov and find good matches for the children of Boris Godunov.
- Nikita Alekseevich Tatischev (1879 — 1948) was the last governor of Moscow.
- Count Nikolay Alekseevich Tatischev (1739 — 1823) was a Russian general of Infantry, the head of the Preobrazhensky regiment.
- Count Nikolay Dmitrievich Tatischev (1829—1907) was a Russian lieutenant general, a hero of the Russo-Turkish war.
- Count Nikolay Ivanovich Tatischev (1861 — 1937) was the mentor of the Imperial princes John Konstantinovich and Gabriel Konstantinovich.
- Stepan Nikolaevich Tatischev (1935 — 1985) was the cultural attaché at the French Embassy in Moscow (1971—1974). He was the grandson of Dmitry Tatischev, the governor of Yaroslavl.
