= Vasily Volkov =

Russian painter

- Василий Алексеевич Волков
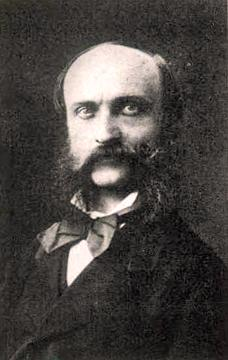
- Born: March 21, 1840; Saint Petersburg
- Died: April 22, 1907 (aged 67); Poltava
- Education: Imperial Academy of Arts (1868)
- Known for: Painting
- Movement: Peredvizhniki

Vasily Alekseyevich Volkov (Russian: Василий Алексеевич Волков; 21 March 1840, Saint Petersburg – 22 April 1907, Poltava) was a Russian-Ukrainian Academic painter; known primarily for portraits and historical scenes.

== Biography ==
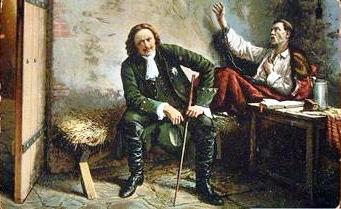
Peter the Great and Pavlo Polubotok (reproduction)

From 1858 to 1863, he studied at the Imperial Academy of Fine Arts. From 1861, he was also a teacher at a local gymnasium. After graduating, he settled in Poltava.

In 1867, he was awarded the title of "Artist" (Third degree). From 1875 until his death, he taught drawing at the Petrovsky Poltava Cadet Corps school. He also occasionally taught at the local Institute for Noble Maidens.

During this time, he also operated his own art school and exhibited with the Peredvizhniki, although he never became a member. He apparently served as a State Councillor. In 1907, he died of cardiac asthma.

Among his best-known portraits are those of Tsars Alexander II and Alexander III, Grand Duke Konstantin Konstantinovich and his fellow painters, Nikolai Yaroshenko and Leonid Pozen. However, he is largely remembered today on the basis of one work.

In 1901 his painting, "Peter the Great Visiting Pavlo Polubotok at Peter and Paul Fortress in 1724" was presented by the Peredvizhniki in Moscow. Peter died 41 days after visiting Polubotok, who ominously forecast that "Soon, very soon, the judgment of God will judge Peter and Paul!".

Public response to the painting was immediate and positive. It was praised in Niva and several other periodicals, including Iskri (Sparks), a satirical magazine. The exhibition catalog sold out and the painting was reproduced as postcards; black and white, color prints and hand-painted versions (which are valuable collector's items).

The current whereabouts of the original are unknown. It is said that Volkov sold it to a visiting Englishman not long after it was exhibited, but there is no record of it being taxed or having left the country; something that was usually documented very meticulously. Most of the reproductions were apparently made from a copy.
