= Klimenty Nagorny =

Russian sailor

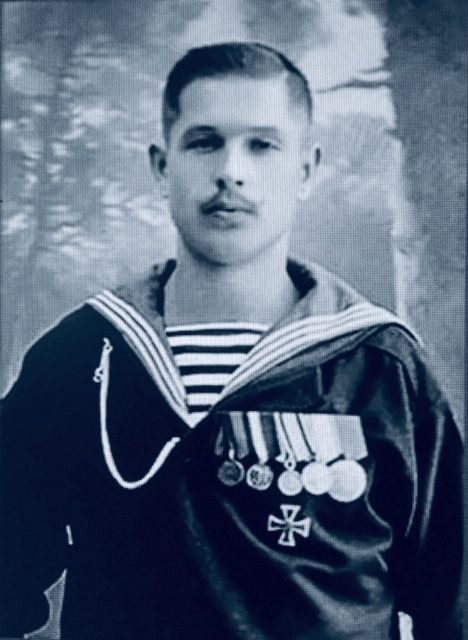

Personal details
- Born: 7 February 1887 Antonovskaya Volost, Kiev Governorate, Russian Empire
- Died: 28 June 1918 (aged 31) Shartash, Yekaterinburg, Soviet Russia

Klimenty Grigorievich Nagorny (Russian: Клименты Григориевич Нагорный; 7 February [O.S. 25 January] 1887 – 28 June 1918) was a Russian sailor and the personal assistant of Alexei Nikolaevich, Tsarevich of Russia.

== Biography ==
Klimenty Grigorievich Nagorny was born in 1887. He originally served as a sailor of the imperial yacht and served the former Imperial family during their exile in Siberia during the Russian Revolution.

He and Ivan Dmitrievich Sednev, another former Russian imperial sailor, were killed shortly before the murder of the Romanov family on 28 June 1918 in Yekaterinburg, where the Romanovs would later die on 17 July 1918.
