= Sydney Gibbes =

British academic (1876–1963)

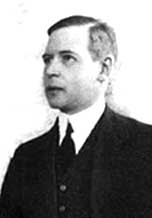
Charles Sydney Gibbes in 1916

Charles Sydney Gibbes (19 January 1876 – 24 March 1963) was a British academic who from 1908 to 1917 served as the English tutor to the children of Emperor Nicholas II of Russia. When Nicholas abdicated the throne in March 1917 Gibbes voluntarily accompanied the Imperial family into exile to the Siberian city of Tobolsk. After the family was murdered in 1918 Gibbes returned to the United Kingdom and eventually became an Orthodox monk, adopting the name of Nicholas in commemoration of Nicholas II. He died in 1963 and is buried at Headington cemetery, Oxford, Oxfordshire, England.

== Biography ==
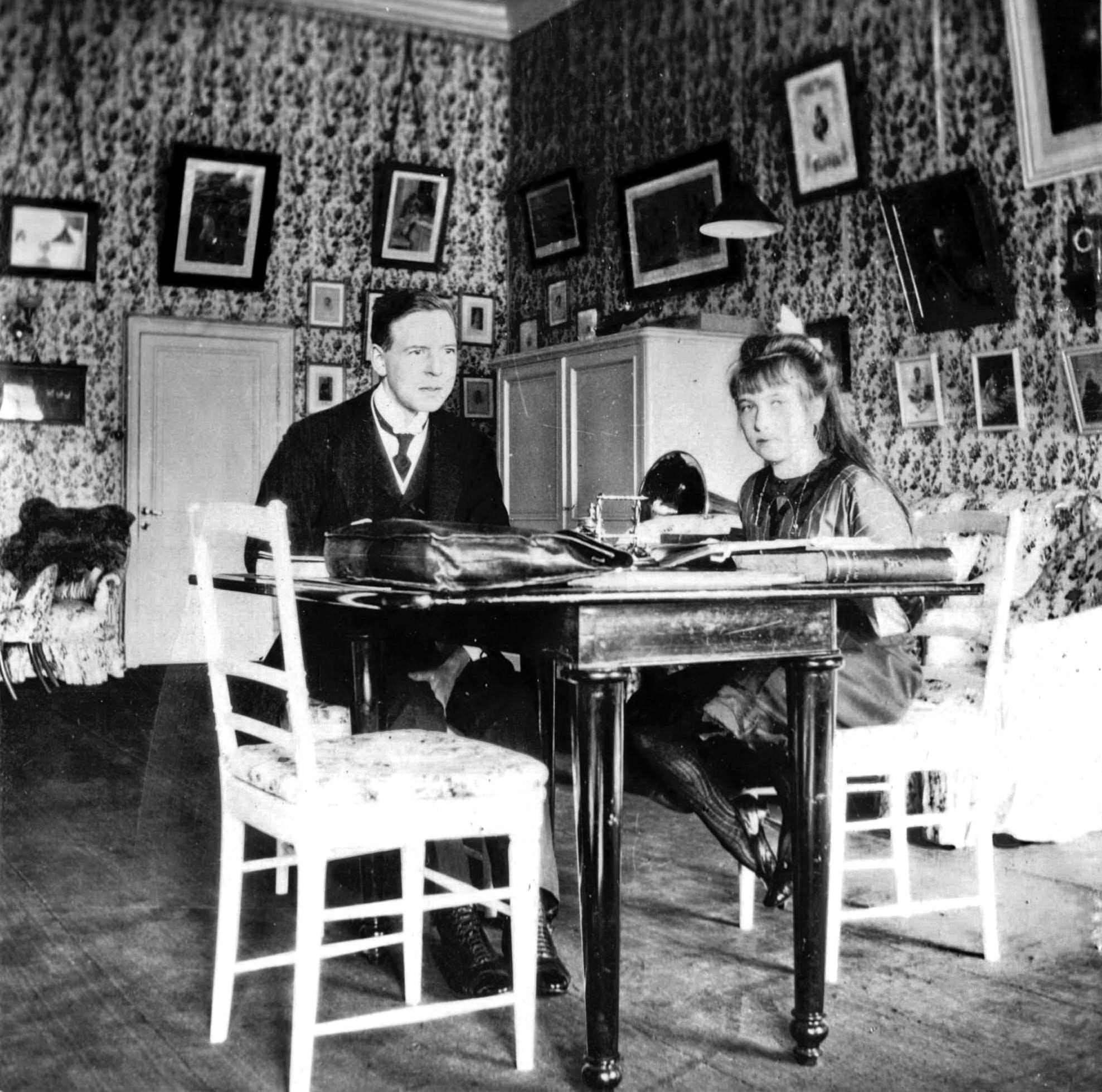
Sydney Gibbes with Grand Duchess Anastasia, c. 1910

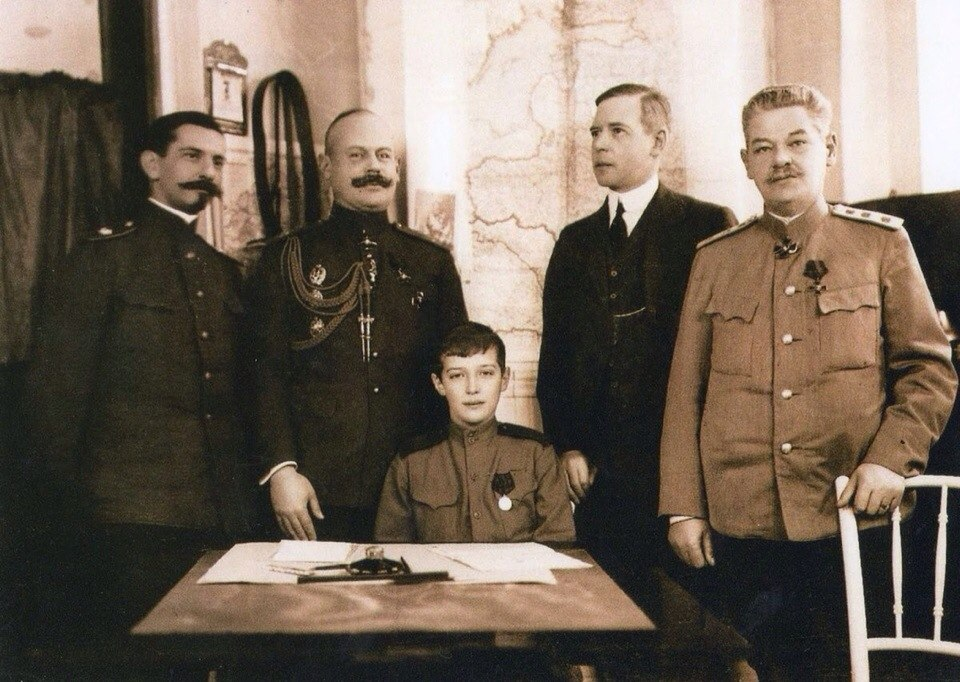
(Left to right) Pierre Gilliard, Major General Voyeikov, Tsarevich Alexis, Sydney Gibbes, Pyotr Vassilievich Petrov, c. 1916

Charles Sydney Gibbes was born in Rotherham, Yorkshire, England, on 19 January 1876. He was the youngest surviving son of John Gibbs, a bank manager, and Mary Ann Elizabeth Fisher, the daughter of a watchmaker. The fate of a younger son often being to enter the church, at the behest of his father, he took the Moral Sciences Tripos at St John's College, Cambridge, gaining a BA in 1899. Whilst at the University of Cambridge, Charles Sydney added the 'e' to the spelling of his own name. He entered upon theological studies in Cambridge and Salisbury in preparation for holy orders but realised that he had no religious vocation. Sydney is described as: severe, stiff, self-restrained, imperturbable, quiet, gentlemanly, cultured, pleasant, practical, brave, loyal, honourable, reliable, impeccably clean, with high character, of good sense and with agreeable manners. He could also be stubborn, use corporal punishment freely, that he could be very awkward with others, and he is recorded as having quite a temper, at least in his younger years.

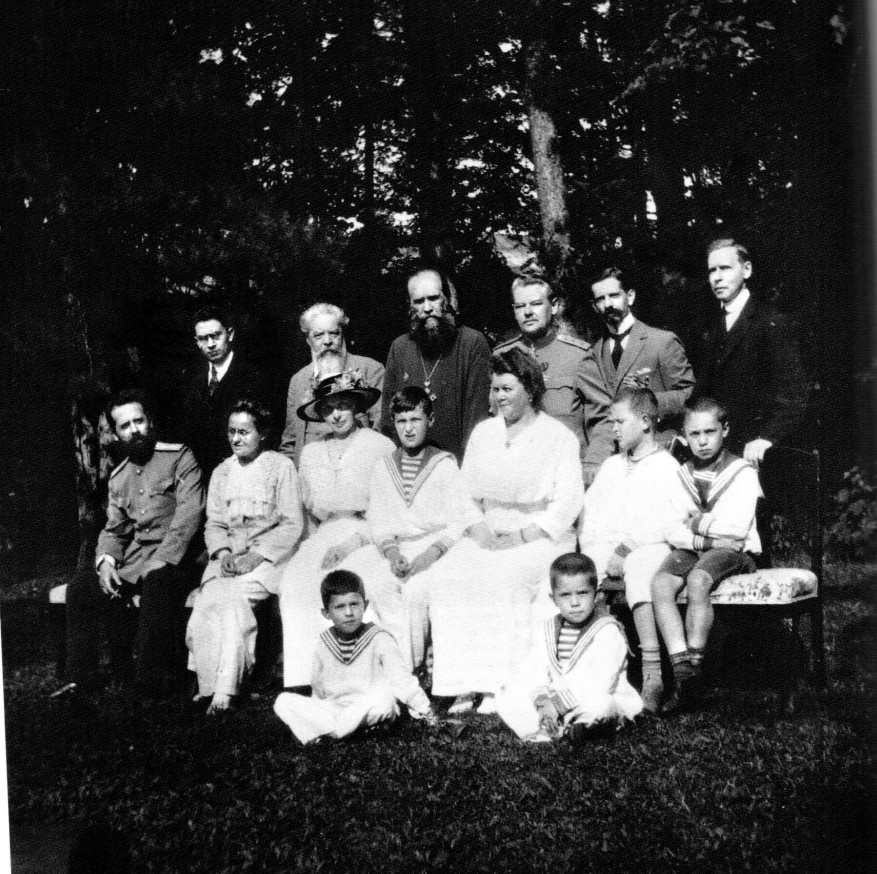
Standing left to right: footman Zhuravski, Terenty Ivanovich Chemodurov, Vasiliev, Petrov, Pierre Gilliard, Sydney Gibbes. Second line: Vladimir Derevenko, Elizaveta Ersberg, Alexandra Tegleva, Tsarevich Alexei Nikolaevich, Maria Gustavna Tutelberg, Kolya Derevenko, Alexei Derevenko, Alexandr Derevenko, and Sergei Derevenko; Tsarskoe Selo in 1916.

Having some talent at languages, he decided to teach English abroad. In 1901 he went to Saint Petersburg, Russia, as tutor to the Shidlovsky family and then the Soukanoff family. He was then appointed to the staff of the Imperial School of Law, and by 1907 he was qualified as vice-president and committee member of the Saint Petersburg Guild of English Teachers. He came to the attention of the Empress Alexandra and in 1908 was invited as a tutor to improve the accents of the Grand Duchesses Olga and Tatiana; and subsequently Maria and Anastasia. In 1913 he became tutor to Tsarevich Alexei. The children referred to him as Sydney Ivanovich.

Gibbes' career as court tutor continued until the February Revolution of 1917, after which the Imperial family was imprisoned in Alexander Palace in Tsarskoe Selo. He was in Saint Petersburg at the time, and immediately after returning to Tsarskoe Selo was proscribed from seeing the family, only being allowed to recover his possessions after the family was transported to the house of the Governor-General of Tobolsk in Siberia. Gibbes voluntarily accompanied the family, arriving in the village in October 1917 shortly before the Provisional Government fell to the Bolsheviks. In May 1918 the Imperial family was moved to the Ipatiev House in Yekaterinburg, and neither Gibbes, French tutor Pierre Gilliard, nursemaid Alexandra Tegleva, nor most other servants were allowed to enter. The servants stayed in the railway carriage which had brought them to the city.

This carriage became part of a refugee train on 3 June and the tutors were in Tyumen but returned to Yekaterinburg after the murder of the Imperial family on the night of 16/17 July 1918 and the fall of the city to the White Army on 25 July. Gibbes and Gilliard were early visitors to the scene of the executions at the Ipatiev House and were both involved in the subsequent enquiries carried out by Ivan Alexandrovich Sergeiev and by Nicholas Alexievich Sokolov.

As the Bolsheviks took Perm and closed in on Yekaterinburg, enquiries were abandoned and Gibbes and Gilliard left for Omsk. Gibbes was appointed as a secretary to the British High Commission in Siberia in January 1919, retreating eastwards as Siberia was captured by the Red Army. He was briefly employed at the British Embassy in Beijing and then became an assistant in the Chinese Maritime Customs in Manchuria.

There was a large White Russian refugee community in Harbin and it was there in 1922 that he met an orphan, Georges Paveliev, whom he adopted. He established George in 1934 on a fruit farm at Stourmouth House in East Stourmouth in Kent.

=== Return to England and conversion to Orthodoxy ===
Gibbes returned to England in 1928 and enrolled as an ordinand at St Stephen's House, Oxford, but again decided that ordination in the Church of England was not to be his vocation.

In Harbin, China on 25 April 1934 he was received into the Orthodox church by Archbishop Nestor (Anisimov) of Kamchatka and Petropavlovsk who was there in exile. Gibbes took the baptismal name of Alexei in honour of the former Tsarevich. He was tonsured monk on 15 December, ordained deacon on 19 December and priest on 23 December, taking the name Nicholas in honour of the former Tsar. In March 1935 he became an Abbot. He again returned to England in 1937 and was established in a parish in London.

At the time of the Blitz he moved to Oxford where in 1941 he established an Orthodox chapel in Bartlemas. In 1949 he bought a house at 4 Marston Street, subsequently known as the Saint Nicholas House. The house was built circa 1890 by a charity founded to distribute free medicine to the poor. During the war the building became the central 'Air Raid Protection' telephone exchange and there is still a 'bomb proof' concrete partition between the ground and first floor. Gibbes kept a chapel dedicated to St Nicholas the Wonderworker within the property. This chapel was home to several icons and mementos of the Imperial family which he brought with him from Yekaterinburg, including a chandelier from the Ipatiev House. The house was divided into flats in the 1960s, and the chapel was converted into a flat in the late 1980s.

=== Death ===
Gibbes died at St Pancras Hospital, London, on 24 March 1963. His open coffin was displayed in the cellar (or crypt) of Saint Nicholas House before his funeral. He is buried in Headington cemetery, Oxford, Oxfordshire, England.

His collection of Russian possessions were left with his adopted son, George, in Oxford, and George subsequently donated them to the museum at Luton Hoo. A small chapel was built there to house these memorabilia, consecrated by Metropolitan Anthony of Sourozh. The museum has been moved from Luton Hoo and is now a part of the Wernher Collection in Greenwich.

A blue plaque, unveiled in 2022, marks his father's workplace at the former Sheffield and Rotherham bank in Rotherham.

== See also ==
- Margaretta Eagar
- Pierre Gilliard
