= Vasily Alexandrovich Dolgorukov =

Russian general (1868–1918)

Prince Vasily Alexandrovich Dolgorukov
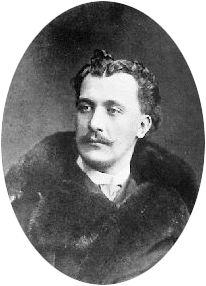

Marshal of the Imperial Court
- In office 1914–1917

Personal details
- Born: 1868
- Died: July 10, 1918 (aged 49–50)

Prince Vasily Alexandrovich Dolgorukov (Russian: Князь Василий Александрович Долгоруков, tr. Vasilij Aleksandrovič Dolgorukov; 1868–1918) was an advisor to Russian Emperor Nicholas II, and a Marshal from 1914 to 1917. After the arrest of the Russian Imperial Family following the February Revolution, he voluntarily accompanied the family into internal exile in Tsarskoe Selo and later Tobolsk. He was barred from joining them in Yekaterinburg in April 1918, and was killed by order of the Bolshevik government in that July.

== Early life ==
Vasily Alexandrovich Dolgorukov was born in 1868 as the second son of Prince Alexander Vasilievich Dolgorukov (1839-1878) and his wife, Princess Maria Sergeievna Dolgorukova (1847-1936).

== Career ==
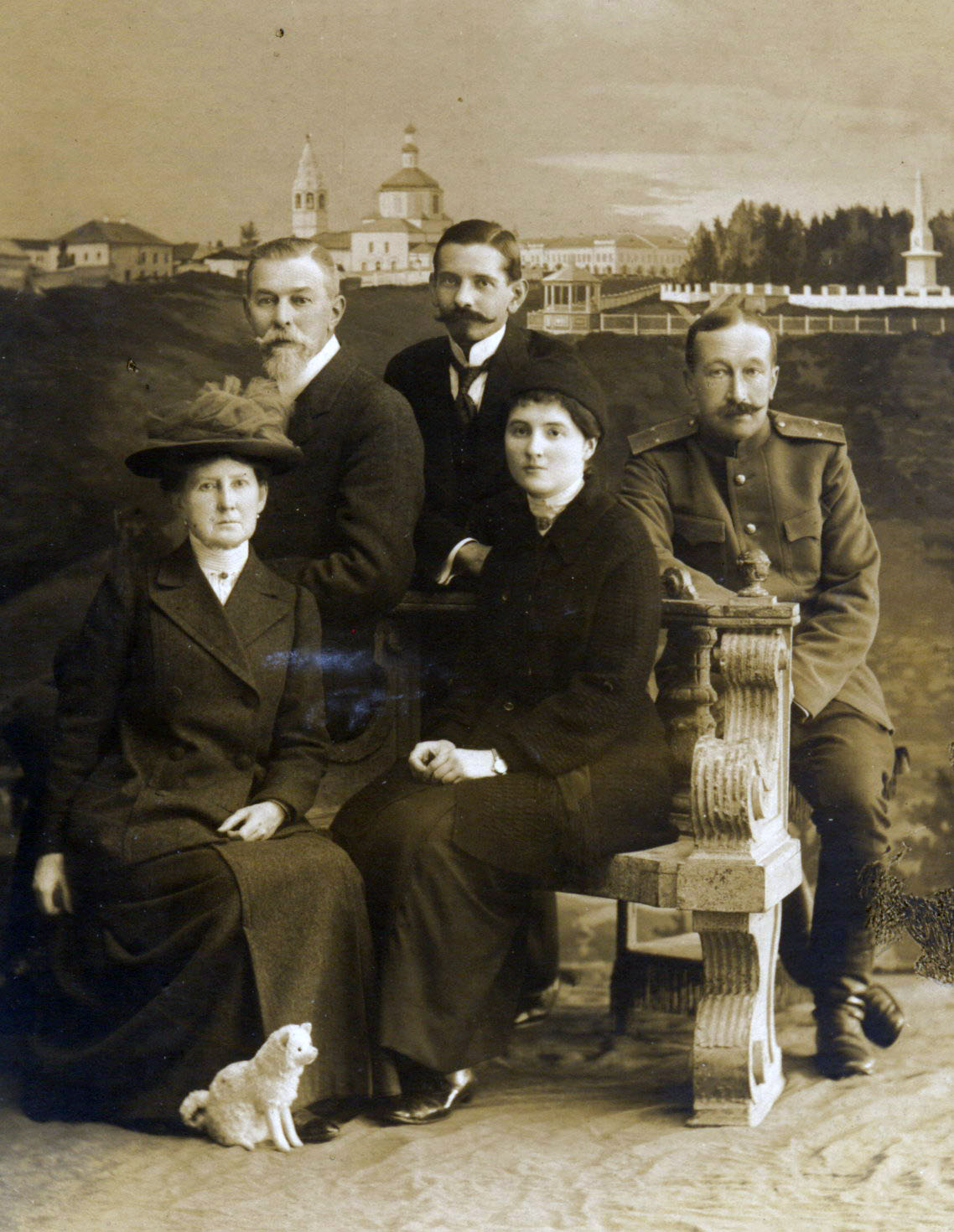
Prince Vasily Dolgorukov (right) with Countess Anastasia Hendrikova, Pierre Gilliard, Count Ilya Tatishchev & Catherine Schneider

In 1907 Dolgorukov became an adjutant, in 1910 a General, and in 1914 a commander of the Imperial Guard cavalry regiment, the Life-Guard Horse Artillery unit. During World War I, he was appointed Marshal of the Imperial Court. In this position, he assisted his stepfather, Count Pavel Benckendorff (1853-1921), in giving military advice to the Tsar. Deeply devoted to the Tsar, on August 14, 1917, he voluntarily accompanied the Imperial family to imprisonment in Tobolsk. He was separated from them when they were transferred to Ekaterinburg.

Dolgorukov was initially allowed to stay in the city when he arrived at the end of April, but was arrested by the Cheka secret police, along with Count Ilya Tatischev, as "enemies of the socialist revolution", after maps of the region showing river routes were allegedly found in his lodgings. During imprisonment, Dolgorukov constantly pressured the British Consulate in Ekaterinburg to help the Imperial family, using pencil-written notes smuggled from his prison cell. Accused of plotting to rescue the Imperial family, Dolgorukov and Tatishchev were taken by Bolshevik revolutionary Grigory Nikulin and Cheka agents beyond the city's Ivanovskoe Cemetery on July 10, shot in the head and thrown into a pit. Nikulin went on to participate in the murder the Romanov family a week later. The bodies of Dolgorukov and Tatishchev were never found.

== Canonization ==
On October 31/November 1, 1981 the Russian Orthodox Church Outside Russia canonized the Prince as The Holy Martyr Warrior, Vasily.
