= Ivan Dmitrievich Sednev =

Russian sailor

Ivan Dmitrievich Sednev (1881 – 28 June 1918 Yekaterinburg), was a Russian sailor. He was the personal servant of the Imperial children of Tsar Nicholas II of Russia. His nephew, Leonid Sednev, was a kitchen boy in the imperial court and was Tsarevich Alexis's last companion in the days before his execution at the Ipatiev House.

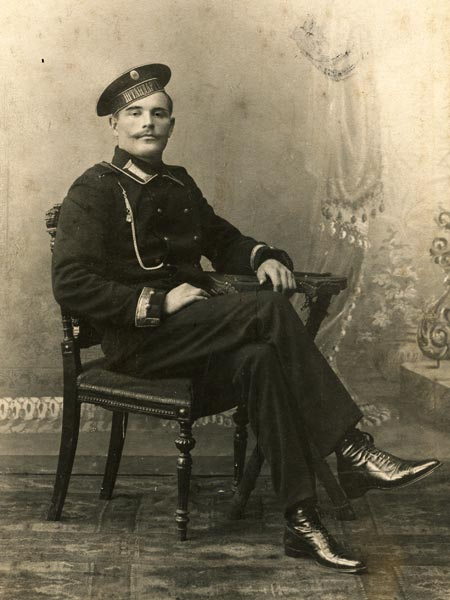
Photograph of Ivan Dmitrievich Sednev

== Biography ==
Ivan Dmitrievich Sednev originally served as a sailor of the imperial yacht. He served the former Imperial family during their exile in Siberia during the Russian Revolution.

He and Klimenty Grigorievich Nagorny, who was another former sailor aboard the imperial yacht, were killed shortly before the murder of the Romanov family, on 28 June 1918.
