= Leonid Sednev =

Servant to the last Russian Emperor Nicholas II and his family

Leonid Ivanovich Sednev
- Leonid Sednev circa 1917
- Born: 1903
- Died: c. 30 September 1941 — 7 January 1942 or 17 July 1942 (aged 37/38/39)
- Occupation: Chef's Assistant
- Relatives: Ivan Dmitriyevich Sednev

Leonid Ivanovich Sednev (Russian: Леонид Иванович Седнев) (1903 – 1941 or 1942) was a chef's assistant who, together with his uncle Ivan Dmitriyevich Sednev, served former Emperor Nicholas II of Russia and his family during their exile in Siberian villages of Tobolsk and Yekaterinburg from 1917 to 1918. Six hours before the Imperial family and their four retainers were murdered in the cellar of the Ipatiev House on the night of July 16/17, 1918, Sednev was taken to a neighboring house, where he was held until July 20. Officials from the Ural Regional Soviet then shipped him off to live with relatives in Kaluga.

Sednev is alleged to have written a brief set of memoirs of his time in the Ipatiev House, though its existence is disputed. There are conflicting accounts of his ultimate fate; according to one report, he was shot in 1929 in Yaroslavl on charges of participating in a counter-revolutionary conspiracy, while other evidence suggests that he was killed during the Battle of Moscow in 1941; according to the obd-memorial.ru (CAMO) he was executed on the verdict of the tribunal of the Bryansk Front for an unspecified crime on 17 July 1942, exactly 24 years to the day the Romanovs were executed.

On October 1, 2008, the Presidium of the Russian Supreme Court approved a petition to recognize the Imperial Family and many of their servants, including Sednev, as victims of political repression. However, of those listed on the original petition only Nicholas, his wife and their five children received mention in the verdict.

== In popular culture ==
- Leonid serves as the narrator in the novel The Kitchen Boy, giving his account of the last days of the Romanovs.
- He appears twice in The Missing series by Margaret Peterson Haddix; in Risked he is a secondary character, and in Rescued he is the protagonist.
