= Ilya Leonidovich Tatischev =

Count Ilya Tatischev
- Илья́ Леони́дович Тати́щев
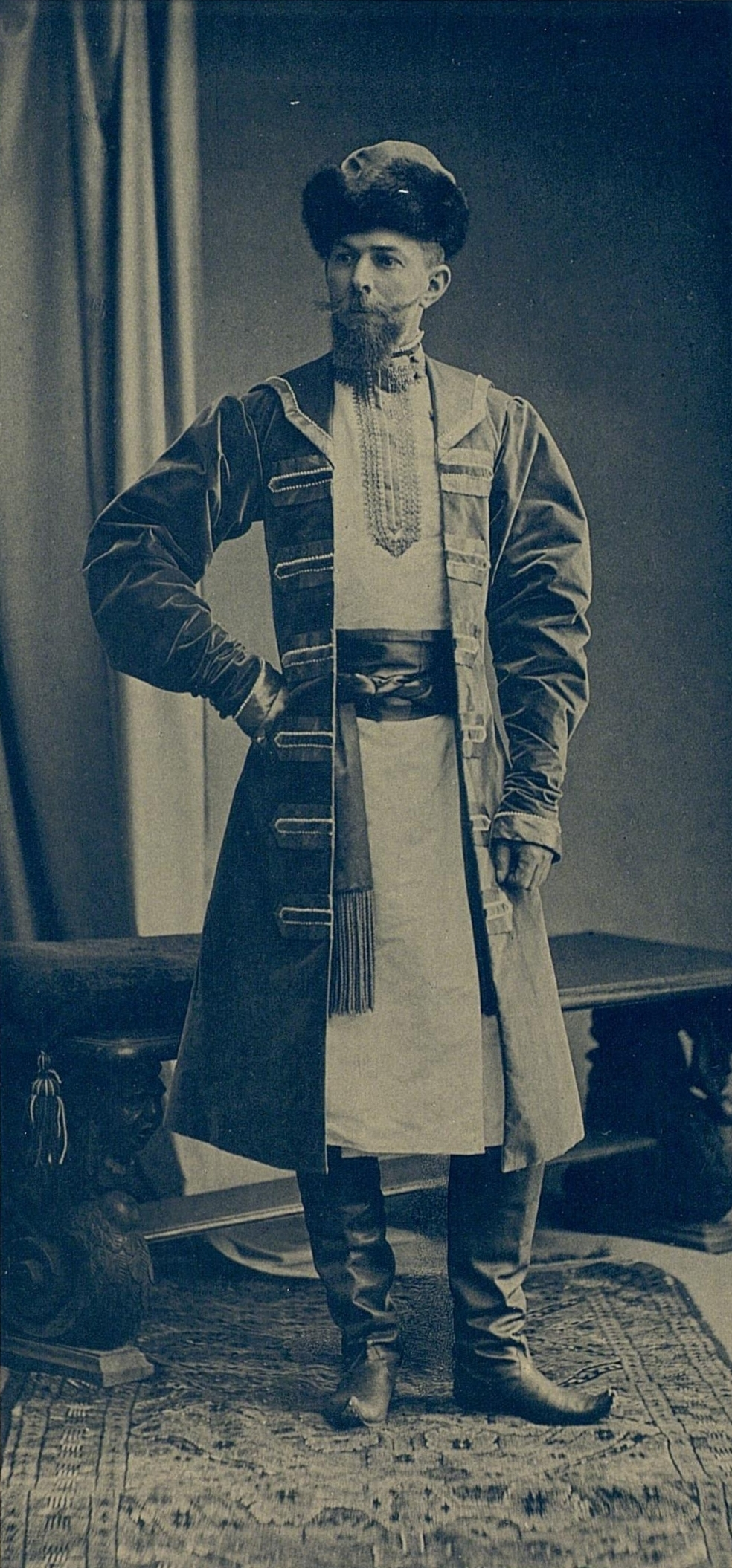
- Count Ilya Tatischev at the 1903 Imperial ball
- Born: Ilya Leonidovich Tatischev; 11 December 1859; Saint Petersburg, Russian Empire
- Died: July 1918 (aged 58); Yekaterinburg, Russia
- Burial place: Ivanovskoe cemetery
- Spouse: never married no issue
- Military career
- Allegiance: Russian Empire
- Branch: Imperial Guard Russian Emperor's Suite
- Service years: 1877–1917
- Rank: lieutenant general adjutant general
- Unit: Hussar Regiment Cavalry

Count Ilya Leonidovich Tatischev (Russian: Илья Леонидович Татищев) (11 December 1859 – July 1918) was a Russian nobleman and Adjutant General to Tsar Nicholas II. He was executed by the Bolsheviks and canonized in the Russian Orthodox Church Outside Russia as a new martyr.

== Biography ==
Count Ilya Tatischev was born on 11 December (24), 1859, in Saint-Petersburg. His father was lieutenant general Count Leonid Alekseevich Tatischev (1827–1881), his mother was Ekaterina Ilyinichna Bibikova (1836–1916), the daughter of adjutant general and general of the artillery Ilya Gavrilovich Bibikov. His mother was a lady-in-waiting to Empress Alexandra Fyodorovna. In 1879 he graduated from the Page Corps.

Together with his brother, Leonid, he owned the village of Protasovo, in the Saransky Uyezd (now Lyambirsky district) Penza Governorate.

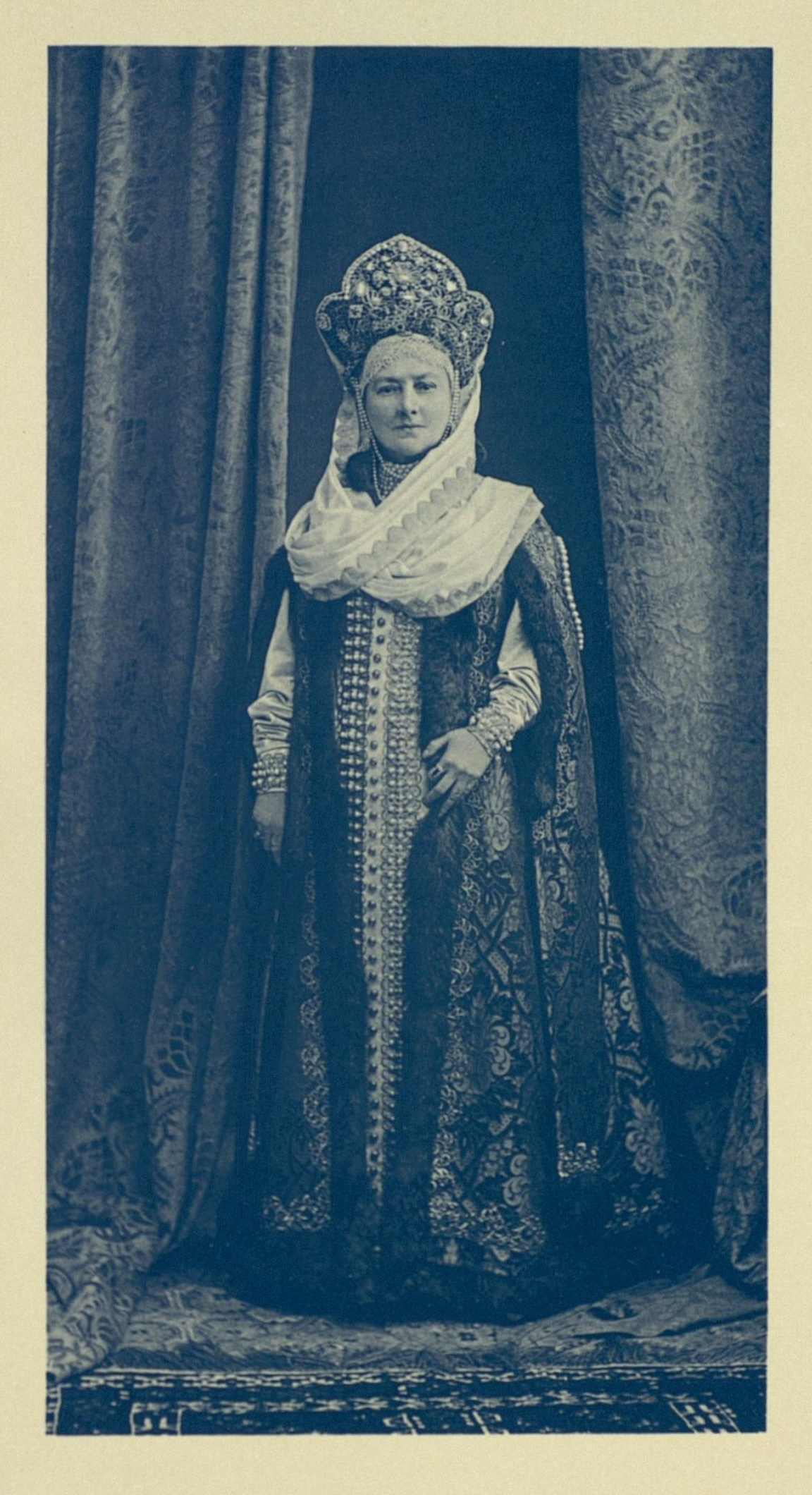
Countess Ekaterina Tatischeva, mother of Ilya Tatischev, at the 1903 Imperial ball

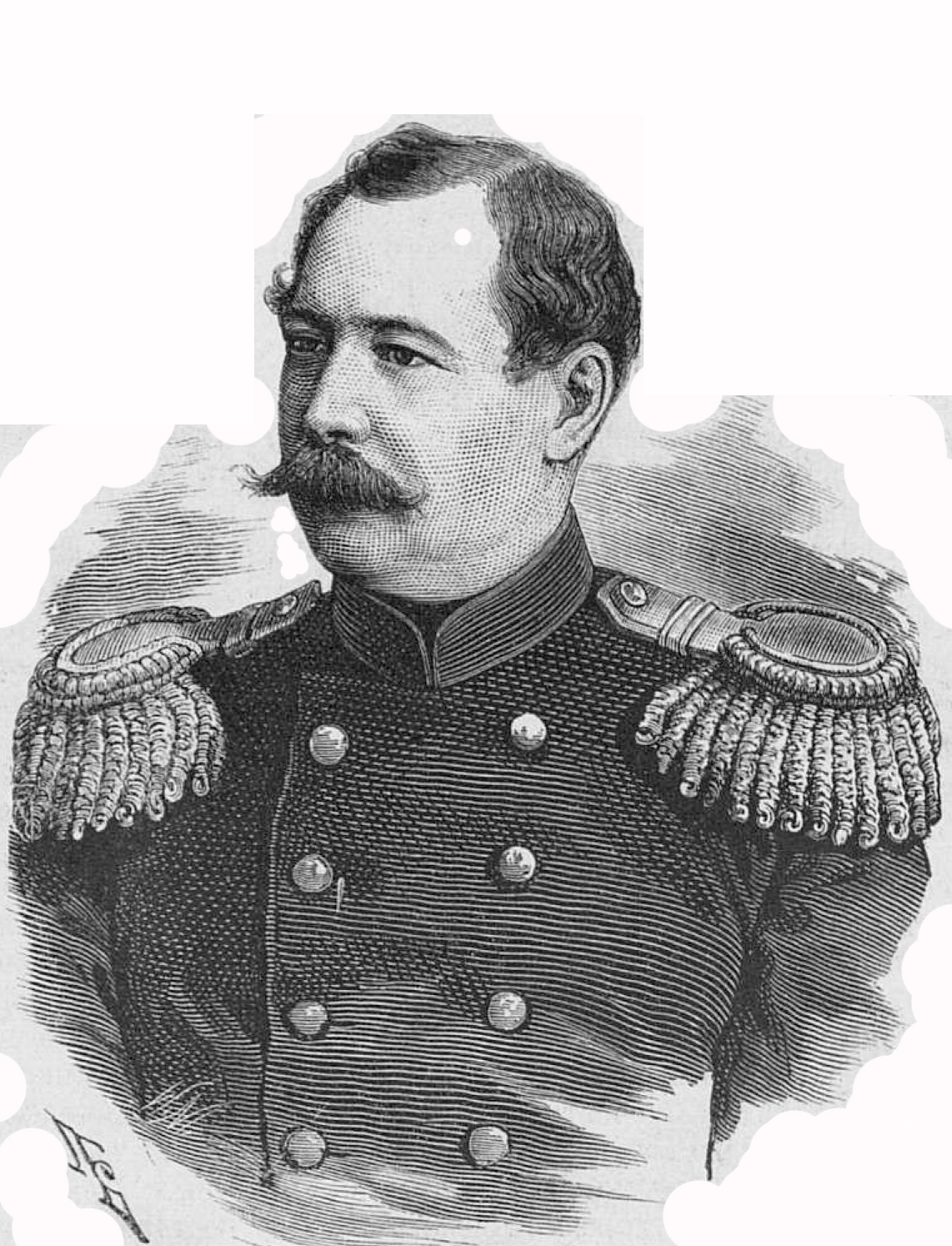
General Count Leonid Tatischev, father of Ilya Tatischev

=== Military career ===
Count Illya Tatischev started military service in 1877. In 1879 he entered the Hussar Regiment of the Russian Imperial Guard in the rank of cornet. In 1890 he was appointed adjutant to Grand Duke Vladimir Alexandrovich as the Commander-in-Chief of the Imperial Guard and Saint-Petersburg Military District. After five years in this rank, in 1895 he received the rank of colonel. Since 11 November 1905, he was appointed the personal adjutant of Grand Duke Vladimir Alexandrovich. In 1905, the son of Grand Duke Vladimir Alexandrovich, Kirill, was expelled from the Imperial House of Russia due to mismarriage. This caused his father to resign. The new commander, Grand Duke Nikolay Nikolayevich, dismissed Illya Tatischev on 6 December 1905. However, on the very same day he was raised to major general and enrolled in the Imperial Suite.

The new position obliged Count Tatischev to represent Tsar Nicholas II at the court of Emperor Wilhelm II, which implied finding out secret information on the state of German military forces. He stayed in Germany until 15 April 1914, when he asked for retirement and was commissioned back to Russia. However, he remained close to Tsar Nicholas II.

During WWI, Illya Tatischev served to the Chief Head of the Sanitary and Evacuation Unit of the Russian Red Cross Society Duke Alexander of Oldenburg. In 1916 he was made lieutenant general of the Imperial Cavalry and appointed Adjutant General of Tsar Nicholas II.

== The Revolution ==
On 18 April 1917, he retired due to illness. Soon, Count Tatischev joined the arrested Imperial family at Tsarskoye Selo.

Tatischev followed the emperor to his exile in Tobolsk. When in April 1918 Nicholas II and his wife were convoyed from Tobolsk to Yekaterinburg, Ilya Tatischev stayed in Tobolsk with their children as wished the empress.

In May 1918, alongside the royal children, he was convoyed to Yekaterinburg, where together with Vasily Dolgorukov, he was kept in prison. According to the witnesses, the two men were shot down by the Bolsheviks 10 days before the Imperial family. It is said that their bodies were found by nuns of the Novo-Tikhvinsky convent and buried at the Ivanopsvkoe cemetery.

== Canonization ==
In October 1981, Count Ilya Leonidovich Tatischev was canonized by the Russian Orthodox Church Outside Russia as a new martyr under the name of Holy Martyr Warrior Illya (Russian: Святой Мученик Воин Илья).

== Awards ==
Domestic awards:

- Order of Saint Stanislaus: 3rd class (1886), 2nd class (1895), 1st class (1906).
- Order of Saint Anna: 3rd class (1891), 2nd class (1897), 1st class (1910).
- Order of Saint Vladimir: 4th class (1900), 3rd class (1903), 2nd class (1913).

Foreign Awards:

- Order of the Lion and the Sun, Persia, (1878).
- Order of the Crown (Württemberg), (1890).
- Order of the Zähringer Lion, Duchy of Baden, Germany, (1890).
- Order of the Crown of Italy (1894), 3rd class, commander.
- Legion of Honour, France, (1894), Chevalier.
- Order of the Griffon, Mecklenernburg-Schwerin, Germany: Honour Cross (1895), Grand Commander's Cross (1897).
- Order of the Crown (Prussia), 2nd class (1898), 1st class (1907), 1st class with diamonds (1909).
- Order of Philip the Magnanimous, Hesse-Darmstadt, Germany: Commander's cross (1901), 1st class (1902).
- Order of the White Eagle, Serbia, 1st class (1915).
- Order of the Sacred Treasure, Japan, 1st class (1915).

== See also ==
- Tatischev family
- Vasily Dolgorukov
- Anastasia Hendrikova
