= Pierre Gilliard =

Swiss tutor to the Russian imperial family (1879–1962)

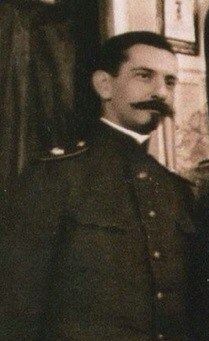
- Gilliard c. 1916
- Born: 16 May 1879; Fiez, Switzerland
- Died: 30 May 1962 (aged 83); Lausanne, Vaud, Switzerland
- Occupations: Tutor; academic; writer
- Spouse: Alexandra Tegleva (m. 1919; died 1955)

Pierre Gilliard (16 May 1879 – 30 May 1962) was a Swiss academic and author, best known as the French-language tutor to the five children of Russian emperor Nicholas II from 1905 to 1918. In 1921, after the Russian Revolution, he published a memoir, Thirteen Years at the Russian Court, about his time with the family. In his memoirs, Gilliard described Empress Alexandra's torment over her son Alexei's hemophilia and her faith in the ability of the starets (elder) Grigori Rasputin to heal the boy.

== Biography ==
Pierre Gilliard was born on 16 May 1879 in Fiez, Switzerland. In his memoirs, Gilliard wrote that he initially came to Russia in 1904 as a French tutor to the family of Duke George of Leuchtenberg, a cousin of the Romanov family. He was recommended as a French tutor to the Tsar's children and began teaching the elder children, Grand Duchesses Olga and Tatiana Nikolaevna of Russia in 1905.

He grew fond of the family and followed them into internal exile at Tobolsk, Siberia, following the Russian Revolution of 1917. The Bolsheviks prevented Gilliard from joining his pupils when they were moved to the Ipatiev House in Ekaterinburg in May 1918. He described his final view of the children in his memoirs:

The sailor Nagorny, who attended to Alexei Nikolaevitch, passed my window carrying the sick boy in his arms, behind him came the Grand Duchesses loaded with valises and small personal belongings. I tried to get out but was roughly pushed back into the carriage by the sentry. I came back to the window. Tatiana Nikolaevna came last carrying her little dog and struggling to drag a heavy brown valise. It was raining and I saw her feet sink into the mud at every step. Nagorny tried to come to her assistance; he was roughly pushed back by one of the commissars ...

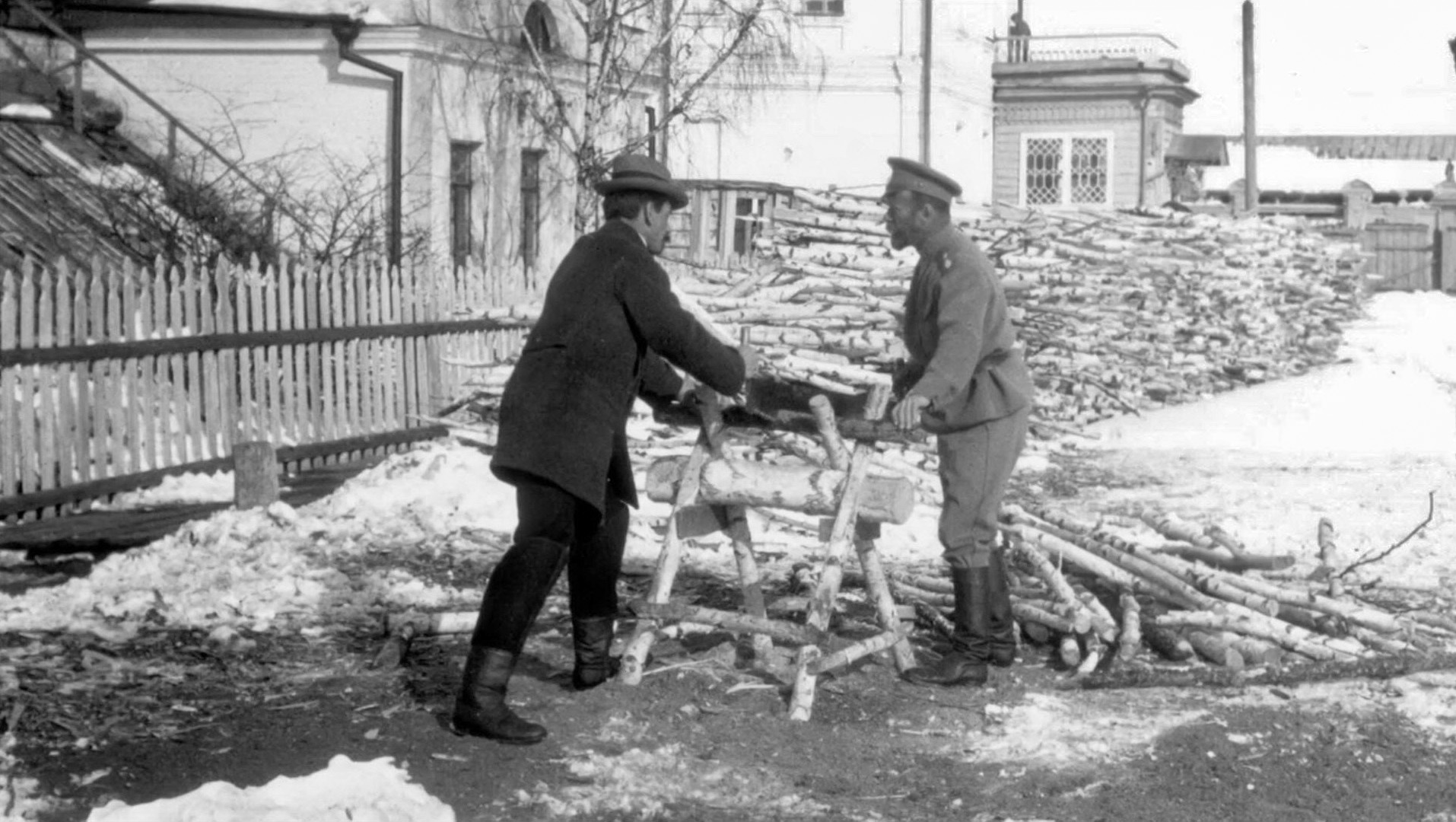
Pierre Gilliard (left) and Nicholas II sawing wood while in exile at Tobolsk, winter 1917–18

Gilliard remained in Siberia after the murders of the family, for a time assisting White Movement investigator Nicholas Sokolov. He married Alexandra "Shura" Tegleva, who had been a nurse to Grand Duchess Anastasia Nikolaevna of Russia, in 1919. In Siberia, he was instrumental in unmasking an impostor who claimed to be the Tsarevich Alexei.

For over a year Gilliard was in the service of General Maurice Janin, the commander of the French military mission during the Russian Civil War, until early November 1919 when along with thousands of others, including ministers and government officials of the old regime, he fled Omsk and headed east on the Trans-Siberian Railway. After a journey lasting six months, he arrived in Vladivostok in early April 1920. He then took an American ship to San Francisco, and from there travelled by ship along the Pacific coast, through the Panama Canal, across the Atlantic Ocean and the Mediterranean Sea to Trieste. He travelled through Italy to Switzerland, and in August 1920 he reached his parents' home in Fiez, which he had left 16 years before.

He became a French professor at the University of Lausanne and was awarded the French Legion of Honor. In 1921, he published a book titled Le Tragique Destin de Nicholas II et de sa famille, which described the last days of the Tsar and his family, and the subsequent investigation into their deaths.

== Anna Anderson ==
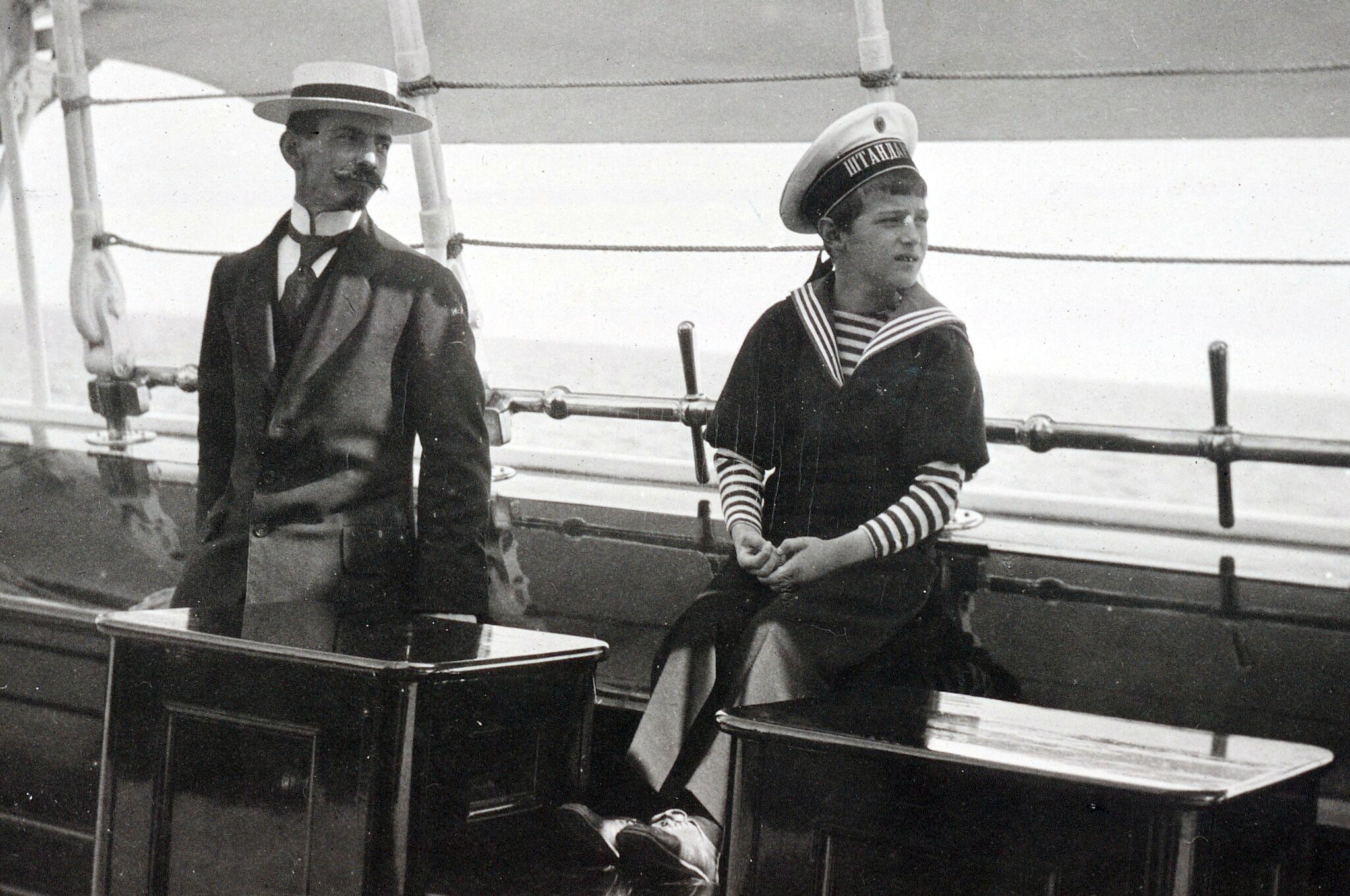
Gilliard and Tsarevich Alexei on board the imperial yacht Standart

In 1925, the Tsar's sister, Grand Duchess Olga Alexandrovna of Russia, asked Gilliard and his wife to investigate the case of Anna Anderson, who claimed to be Grand Duchess Anastasia. On 27 July 1925, the Gilliards saw Anderson at St. Mary's Hospital in Berlin, where Anderson was being treated for a tubercular infection of her arm. Anderson was severely ill and semi-conscious. Madame Gilliard asked to examine Anderson's feet, and noted that Anderson's feet were shaped similarly to Anastasia's: both had bunions. Gilliard insisted that Anderson be moved to a better hospital, to ensure her survival while her identity was investigated.

After an operation on Anderson's arm, she recuperated at the Mommsen Nursing Home in Berlin. There, in October 1925, the Gilliards saw Anderson again. Anderson did not recognise Gilliard, which she later claimed was because he had shaved off his goatee beard. When he asked her to "tell me everything about your past", she refused. According to Gilliard, Anderson mistook Shura for Grand Duchess Olga on the second day of their visit. At a subsequent meeting, Anderson mimicked the actions of Anastasia when she asked Shura to moisten her forehead with eau de Cologne, which left Shura shaken.

Anderson's supporters claimed that the Gilliards recognized Anderson as Anastasia, while the Gilliards denied it, and said her supporters mistook their compassion for recognition. Anderson's friend and lifelong supporter, Harriet von Rathlef, wrote that she spotted Gilliard in the hallway, looking agitated, and muttering in French, "My God, how awful! What has become of Grand Duchess Anastasia? She's a wreck, a complete wreck! I want to do everything I can to help the Grand Duchess!" Gilliard denied that he said this and in his book The False Anastasia he noted that Rathlef wrote to him with purported "memories" of the "Grand Duchess", yet all these either were general knowledge, or if more personal, contained errors the real Anastasia would never have made. Gilliard was appalled to find out that Mrs Rathlef would take his corrections of these "memories" and then publish the corrected version. Shura was said to have cried when she left Anderson, wondering why she loved the woman as much as she loved the grand duchess, yet "Anastasia" had thought Shura to be her Aunt Olga, nor could she answer any of the "little intimate questions" they asked. Subsequent investigation by Gilliard demonstrated that the woman had learned her extensive knowledge about the Imperial Family through living two years in Russian noble society in Berlin.

On departure from the hospital, Gilliard told the Danish Ambassador in Berlin, Herluf Zahle, "We are going away without being able to say that she is not Grand Duchess Anastasia." Gilliard later wrote to von Rathlef making further inquiries about Anderson's health, but he referred to her as "the invalid" rather than "Anastasia". By the beginning of 1926, however, Gilliard was clearly of the opinion that Anderson was an impostor.

Pierre Gilliard (1923). Thirteen Years at the Russian Court (open source). Chapter Thirteen "Tsar at the Duma – Galacia – Life at G.Q.H. – Growing Disaffection". Click to open the PDF.

While supporters of Anderson insisted that the Gilliards recognized her as Anastasia and then recanted, possibly the couple was hesitant at first because her emaciated condition made her look so different from the plump teenage Anastasia they had last seen. While this was enough to suspend their initial doubts, they eventually decided, once she was better and they could question her more closely, that she was an impostor. Anderson's supporters accused Gilliard of turning his back on her because he was paid off by the Tsarina's brother, Ernest Louis, Grand Duke of Hesse.

Like Ernest Louis, Gilliard became a vociferous opponent of Anderson and her circle. Gilliard wrote articles and a book titled The False Anastasia, which claimed she was a "vulgar adventuress" and a "first-rate actress". He said that he had known at once that she was not Anastasia, there was no facial resemblance, her entire knowledge of Russian imperial life was gleaned from magazines, books, and her friends, and she could not speak Russian, English or French. He testified against her in Hamburg in 1958. The lawsuits, designed to determine whether she was truly the grand duchess, eventually ended inconclusively in 1970, after Gilliard's death.

DNA tests were carried out in 1995, which proved that Anderson was not Anastasia, but was a Polish woman by the name of Franziska Schanzkowska.

== Death ==
In 1958, Gilliard was severely injured in a car accident in Lausanne. He never fully recovered and died four years later on 30 May 1962.

== Legacy ==
Gilliard was a keen photographer and he took hundreds of images while in Russia, including many informal photographs of the Romanov family. These are now held by the Musée de l'Élysée, a photography museum in Lausanne. In 2005 Daniel Girardin, an art historian who worked at the Musee de l'Elysee as a curator until 2017, published a pictorial biography of Gilliard's time in Russia based on his works in the museum's collection. It is titled Précepteur des Romanov - Le destin russe de Pierre Gilliard [Tutor of the Romanovs: The Russian Destiny of Pierre Gilliard].

== Film ==
- In the 1971 British film Nicholas and Alexandra, Gilliard was played by Belgian actor Jean-Claude Drouot.
- Gilliard was portrayed by the actor Pierre Carbonnier in the 2017 documentary Le tragique destin des Romanov - Treize années à la cour de Russie [The Tragic Fate of the Romanovs: Thirteen Years at the Russian Court], produced by Arte France and Bel Air Media, which is based on Guilliard's 1921 account of his time with the Romanovs.
- British actor Oliver Dimsdale portrayed Gillaird in the 2019 Netflix series The Last Czars.

== See also ==
- Margaretta Eagar
- Sydney Gibbes
