= Khodynka =

Khodynka may refer to the following:

- Khodynka Field, a large open space in Moscow, Russia
  - Khodynka Tragedy, 1896
    - Khodynka: An Incident of the Coronation of Nicholas II, by Leo Tolstoy, about the tragedy
- Khodynka Arena, now Megasport Sport Palace, a sports facility in Moscow, Russia
- Khodynka Aerodrome, a former airport in Moscow, Russia

== See also ==
- Khodynka Cup of Sorrows, Russian Tsar Nicholas II coronation cup
