= Anastasia Hendrikova =

Russian courtier (1887–1918)

Countess Anastasia Hendrikova
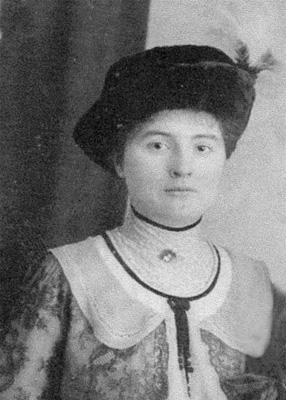
- Born: 23 June 1887; Saint Petersburg, Russian Empire
- Died: 4 September 1918 (aged 31); Perm, Russia
- Father: Count Vassili Alexandrovich Hendrikov
- Mother: Princess Sophia Petrovna Gagarina

Countess Anastasia Vasilyevna Hendrikova (23 June 1887 – 4 September 1918), was a lady in waiting at the court of Tsar Nicholas II and Tsarina Alexandra. She was arrested by the Bolsheviks and shot to death outside Perm in the autumn of 1918.

Like the Romanovs and their servants who were killed on 17 July 1918, Hendrikova and Catherine Adolphovna Schneider, the elderly court tutor who was killed with her, were canonized as martyrs by the Russian Orthodox Church Outside Russia in 1981.

== Biography ==
Anastasia was the daughter of Count Vassili Alexandrovich Hendrikov, Grand Master of Ceremonies of the Imperial Court, and his wife, Princess Sophia Petrovna Gagarina. She was a member of the Russian nobility as part of the Hendrikov Family. She was a descendant of the sister of Catherine I of Russia, the wife of Peter the Great.

Hendrikova was appointed a lady of waiting in 1910. She acted as a "sort of unofficial governess" to the four grand duchesses.

=== Exile and death ===
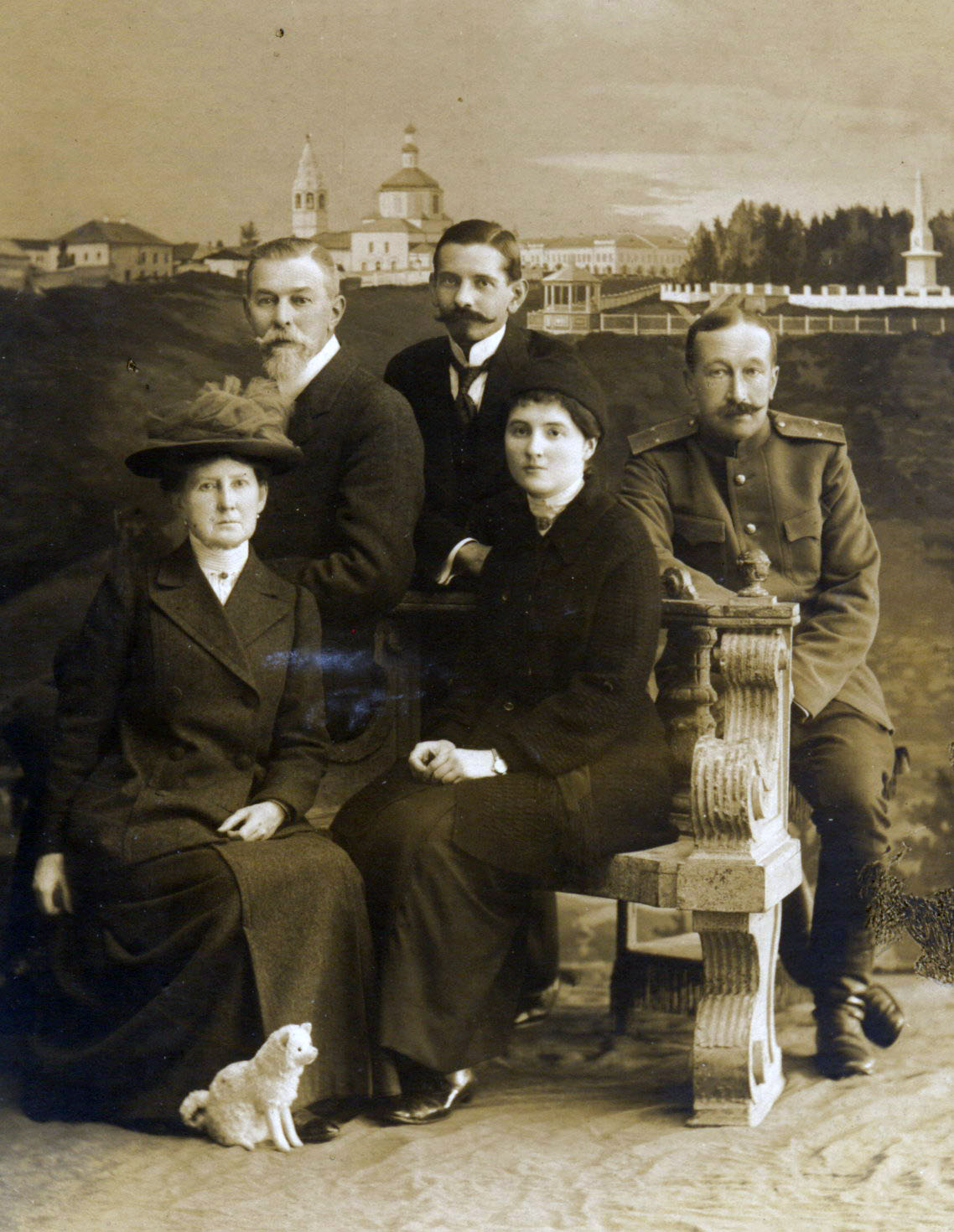
From left to right: Catherine Schneider, Count Ilya Tatishchev, Pierre Gilliard, Anastasia Hendrikova and Prince Vasily Dolgorukov

Hendrikova was devoted to the Romanov family and followed them into exile after the Russian Revolution of 1917, going with them first to Tobolsk and later to Ekaterinburg, even though she was worried about her own family.

Hendrikova's sister Alexandra Balashova, nicknamed "Inotchka," was ill with tuberculosis. "The two sisters were all the world to each other," wrote her fellow lady in waiting, Baroness Sophie von Buxhoeveden, recalling how Hendrikova's "dark eyes glowed" when she heard news about her sister. "And it was from Inotchka's bedside that Nastenka had rushed back to Tsarskoe Selo on the news of the revolution to join the empress in her danger. Now she seldom had news."

Buxhoeveden thought Hendrikova was aware of the danger that she was in. Hendrikova had "so fixed her thoughts on approaching death that it had no terror for her," Buxhoeveden wrote in her memoirs. "She was very pretty and looked younger than her twenty-eight years, but she welcomed the thought of death, so weary had she become of life and so much detached from earthly interests. I felt her drifting away to higher planes."

Hendrikova was forcibly separated by the Bolsheviks from the Romanov family at Ekaterinburg and imprisoned in Perm for some months.

=== Account of death ===
On 4 September 1918, Hendrikova and Schneider were taken from their prison cell and led to the prison office along with Aleksei Volkov, a sixty-year-old valet in the household of the Tsar. They were joined by eight other prisoners, including the chambermaid from the house where Grand Duke Michael Alexandrovich of Russia had lived. They had an escort of twenty-two guards, none of them Russian.

Volkov, who later escaped, recalled that when he asked a guard where they were being taken, he was told they were being taken "to the house of arrest." Hendrikova, who had been in the washroom, asked a guard the same question when she came out. She was told they were being taken "to the central prison." Hendrikova asked him, "and from there?" The guard replied, "Well! to Moscow." Hendrikova repeated this conversation to her fellow prisoners and made the sign of the cross with her fingers. Volkov took her gesture to mean "they will not shoot us."

The sailor at the prison office door kept checking the front door that led to the street to make sure no one was there. After a while another sailor said, "Let's go." They lined the prisoners up in the street in rows of two, the men in front and the women in back. The group walked all the way to the edge of town and onto the Simbirsk road. Volkov asked another prisoner where the central prison was and was told they had long passed it. Volkov realized they were being taken into the woods to be shot. Volkov broke from the group and ran for his life at the first opportunity. A bullet whizzed past his ear. Behind him he heard gunshots as the other prisoners in the group, among them Hendrikova, were shot and killed.

The bodies of Hendrikova and Schneider were recovered by the Whites in May 1919, and were reburied in the Yegoshikha Cemetery. However, their graves were destroyed when the Bolsheviks regained control of the city.

== Ancestry ==
Ancestors of Anastasia Hendrikova

8. Ivan Andreevich Hendrikov
4. Alexander Ivanovich Hendrikov
2. Vassili Hendrikov
5. Evdokia Vasilievna Gudovich
1. Anastasia Henrikova
12. Dimitry Ivanovich Gagarin
6. Pytor Dmitrievich Gagarin
3. Sofia Petrovna Gagarina
14. Alexander Ivanovich Stenbock-Fernor
7. Anastasia Alexandrovna Stenbock-Fermor
15. Nadezhda Alekseevna Yakolev

== See also ==
- Romanov sainthood
- New Martyr

== Notes ==
- Rappaport, Helen. Four Sisters: The Lost Lives of the Romanov Grand Duchesses. Pan Macmillan, 2014. ISBN 978-1-4472-5935-0
