= Aleksei Andreyevich Volkov =

Aleksei Andreyevich Volkov (1859–1929) was a valet at the court of Tsar Nicholas II. After Russia October Revolution of 1917 he managed to escape a death march at Perm in September 1918 and survived to write his memoirs about his time at court and his escape. These include his experience of events such as the Khodynka Tragedy.

== Early life ==
Volkov was born in the town of Old-Ioriev, Kozlov District, Tambov Guberniya. As a young adult, he entered the Russian Army and rose through the ranks. He was on guard and witnessed the assassination of Tsar Alexander II in 1881. Later he was a military instructor to Tsar Nicholas II. From 1886, he was in service to Grand Duke Paul Alexandrovich of Russia. He became a valet at the court of the Tsar in 1910. He was the Tsarina's personal servant and often pushed her wheelchair.

== Exile ==
Volkov followed the Tsar's family and household into internal exile following the Russian Revolution of 1917, but was separated from them at Ekaterinburg and imprisoned at Perm. There, he heard that the Tsar had been murdered by Bolsheviks, though he was unaware that the Tsarina and their children had also been shot.

== Escape from death ==
On 4 September 1918, he was taken from his prison cell in the middle of the night and led to the prison office, where he saw lady-in-waiting Anastasia Hendrikova and the elderly tutor Catherine Schneider. They were joined by eight other prisoners, including the chambermaid from the house where Grand Duke Michael Alexandrovich of Russia had lived. They had an escort of twenty-two guards, none of whom were Russian.

Volkov asked a guard where they were being taken and was told they were being taken "to the house of arrest." Hendrikova, who had been in the washroom, asked a guard the same question when she came out. She was told they were being taken "to the central prison." Hendrikova asked him, "and from there?" The guard replied, "Well! to Moscow." Hendrikova repeated this conversation to her fellow prisoners and made the sign of the cross with her fingers. Volkov took her gesture to mean "they will not shoot us."

The sailor at the prison office door kept checking the front door that led to the street to make sure no one was there. After a while another sailor said, "Let's go." They lined the prisoners up in the street in rows of two, the men in front and the women in back. The group walked all the way to the edge of town and onto the Simbirsk road. Volkov asked another prisoner where the central prison was and was told they had long passed it. Volkov realized they were being taken into the woods to be shot. He broke from the group and ran for his life at the first opportunity. A bullet whizzed past his ear. Behind him he heard gunshots as the other prisoners in the group were shot and killed.

Volkov eventually joined other refugees at the White Army headquarters in Omsk and made his escape from Russia through Vladivostok and the Far East. In 1922, he settled in Estonia. He later lived in Denmark, where he was highly respected in the émigré community because of his lifelong loyalty to the Romanov family.

== Anna Anderson ==
In 1925, Prince Valdemar of Denmark asked Volkov to visit Anna Anderson, who claimed to be Valdemar's great-niece, Grand Duchess Anastasia Nikolaevna of Russia. Anderson was being treated at St. Mary's Hospital in Berlin for a tubercular infection of her arm. When Volkov first arrived at the hospital, on 3 July 1925, he caught a glimpse of Anderson when she went for a walk in the hospital grounds. At that point, Volkov thought Anderson resembled Anastasia, but the next day, they met one another and Volkov was dismayed to find that Anderson could not or would not speak Russian with him. Anderson did not recognise him, and Volkov was unable to discern a facial resemblance to Anastasia. The following day, Volkov returned for a third time and expressed his doubts as to her identity, but would not say definitely that Anderson was not Anastasia. On his final visit the following day, 6 July 1925, Anderson correctly answered some of his questions, and recounted stories of Grand Duchess Anastasia's life before the Revolution that moved Volkov to tears.

At the conclusion of his visit, Volkov did not say whether he thought Anderson was or was not Anastasia. Afterwards, in an interview with the Russian-language newspaper Poslednyi Novosti, published in Estonia on 15 January 1926, Volkov denied Anderson was Anastasia, and decried her as an impostor.

Volkov's memoirs, Souvenirs d'Alexis Volkov, were published by Payot of Paris in 1928, a year before his death in 1929. Serge Ostrogorsky, a Russian courtier who knew Volkov, claimed after Volkov's death that Volkov had told him that Anderson was not Anastasia and that the encounter had moved him to tears, but also that he admitted that he had kissed her hand. Ostrogorsky claimed that he pressed Volkov to account for the hand-kissing, which "he would never have done if someone other than Grand Duchess Anastasia had been standing before him". At which point, according to Ostrogorsky, Volkov said, "I believe that she is the Grand Duchess, but how can the Grand Duchess speak no Russian?"

In 1995, DNA tests confirmed that Anderson was not Anastasia, but was instead a Polish woman with a history of mental illness who went missing just before Anderson first appeared in Germany. It is now known that Anastasia was murdered along with the rest of the immediate Imperial family on July 18, 1918, but that she and her brother Alexei were buried in a separate location from the rest, and her body was not located until 2007.
