= Praskovya Alexandrovna Hendrikova =

Russian lady-in-waiting (1802–1843)

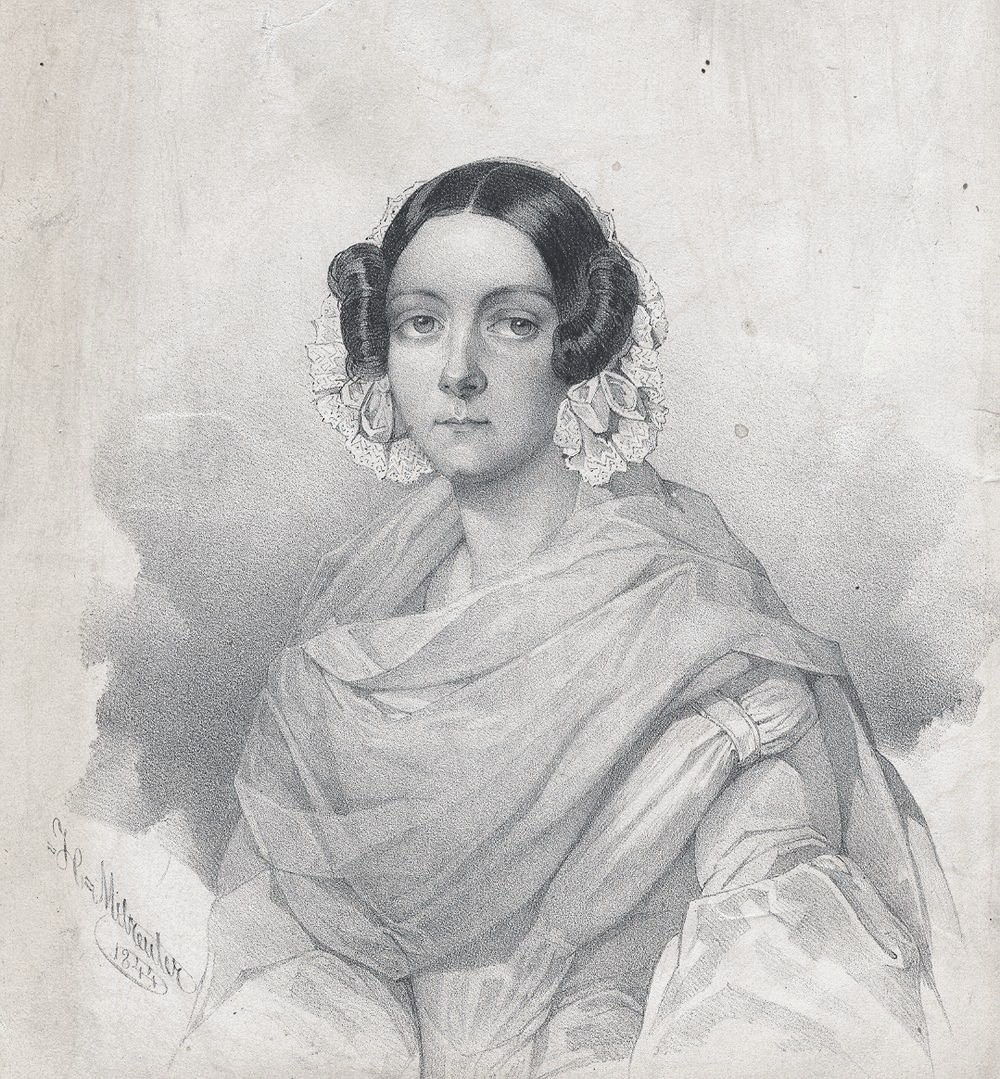
- Native name: Прасковья Александровна Гендрикова
- Born: 3 March 1802; Saint Petersburg, Russia
- Died: 24 March 1843 (aged 41); Saint Petersburg, Russia
- Noble family: Khilkov (by birth); Hendrikov (by marriage)
- Spouse: Alexander Ivanovich Hendrikov
- Issue: Anna Alexandrovna Hendrikova; Dmitry Alexandrovichand Hendrikov; Stepan Alexandrovich Hendrikov; Anna Alexandrovna Hendrikova
- Father: Alexander Yakovlevich Khilkov
- Mother: Feodosia Ivanovna Mestmakher

Countess Praskovya Alexandrovna Hendrikova (née Princess Khilkova; 3 March [O.S. 19 February] 1802 – 24 March [O.S. 12 March] 1843) was a Russian lady-in-waiting to Empress Maria Feodorovna, a favorite of Grand Duke Michael Pavlovich of Russia, the sister of military general Prince Stepan Khilkov, and head of the Elizabethan Institute Lyubov Bezobrazova.

== Early life and education ==
Hendrikova was born to Prince Alexander Yakovlevich Khilkov (1755–1819) and his second wife, Baroness Feodosia Ivanovna Mestmakher. She was born in St. Petersburg, and baptized on 29 June, 1802 in the Simeonov Church in the presence of her maternal grandfather, Baron Ivan Ivanovich Mestmakher, who at the time was the Russian ambassador to Dresden, and Princess Maria Khilkova.

She was educated at the Catherine Institute, from which she graduated in 1820 with a large gold cipher. Empress Maria Feodorovna spoke about her to the entire institute “Donnez plus souvent des Paulette Hilkoff” (Take an example from Paulette Khilkova).

== Life at court ==
At the end of her studies, she was appointed Lady-in-waiting at the Imperial court, where she soon became a favorite. It was said that she danced and sang beautifully at musical evenings. Vasily Zhukovsky was fond of her, as can be seen from the entries in his diary, where he dedicated poems to her: "Is it a sin for you, beautiful countess..."

At court, she drew the attention of Grand Duke Michael Pavlovich of Russia, the younger brother of Emperors Alexander I and Nicholas I. The Grand Duke formally asked for her hand in marriage. Alexander I of Russia sympathised with his brother. The Emperor was inclined to agree, but Dowager Empress Maria Feodorovna remained adamant. “My child,” she said, “do as you want, but before you is a bad example of Konstantin.”

Princess Khilkova denied she had ever encoraged the Grand Duke and, as proof, asked permission to leave her place at court. This worked and soon Mikhail Pavlovich left for Stuttgart to meet his future wife, and Praskovya remained at court. On 6 October 1823, she sang "with excellent art and pleasantness" at a musical evening in Gatchina on the occasion of the arrival of Elena Pavlovna.

Three years later, Princess Khilkova married a young and wealthy Guards officer, Count Alexander Ivanovich Hendrikov (1807–1881).

== Marriage and Children ==
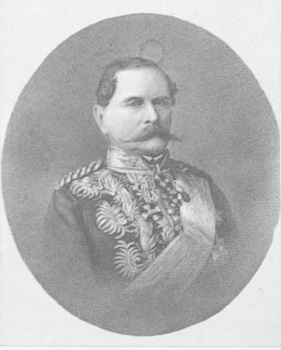
Count Hendrikov

Their wedding took place on November 3, 1826 in the Court Cathedral in the Winter Palace. “Pashinka Khilkova has been Countess Gendrikova for a week now,” wrote Alexandra Voeikova, “and they say she is very pleased and happy”. After her husband's resignation, she lived in Kharkiv from 1832. At the ball given on the occasion of the arrival of Tsarevich Alexander in the city on October 12, 1837, Countess Gendrikova, as Semyon Yurievich, was "a la tete de la societe de Kharkov" (at the head of society of Kharkov) and danced with the heir. Together, they had three sons and one daughter:

- Alexander (1827–1851; lieutenant, mortally wounded in a duel by Baron E.O. Rosen)
- Dmitry (1831–1898; Lieutenant General)
- Stepan (1832–1901; privy councilor)
- Anna (1830–1886; Lady-in-waiting, married to the Ryazan governor N. A. Boldarev)

== Illness and death ==
The Hendrikovs enjoyed the favor of Grand Duchess Elena Pavlovna. In 1841, she persuaded the count to accept the post Equerry, which gave them weekly access to the courtyard. The change in the favorable climate of Kharkiv to Saint Petersburg had a detrimental effect on the health of Praskovya, and she was constantly ill. At the beginning of 1843, her disease worsened. She was visited daily by the Grand Duke Mikhail Pavlovich and very often by the Empress. In addition to high society, the whole city knew about her imminent death, seeing every day the royal carriages at her entrance. On March 12, 1843, she died of pneumonia. The whole court came to say goodbye to the body, the emperor was the last just before the removal, and Grand Duke Mikhail Pavlovich was at the funeral service in St. Isaac's Cathedral. He grieved for several days and made no appearances. “I love her more than anything else and I will love her until my last breath,” the Grand Duke said. The body of Countess Hendrikova was taken to the Kharkiv estate of her husband in the village of Grafskoe, Volchansk district, and buried under St. Andrew's Church.
