= Grand Duchess Natalia Petrovna of Russia =

Daughter of Peter the Great (1718–1725)

Grand Duchess Natalia Petrovna
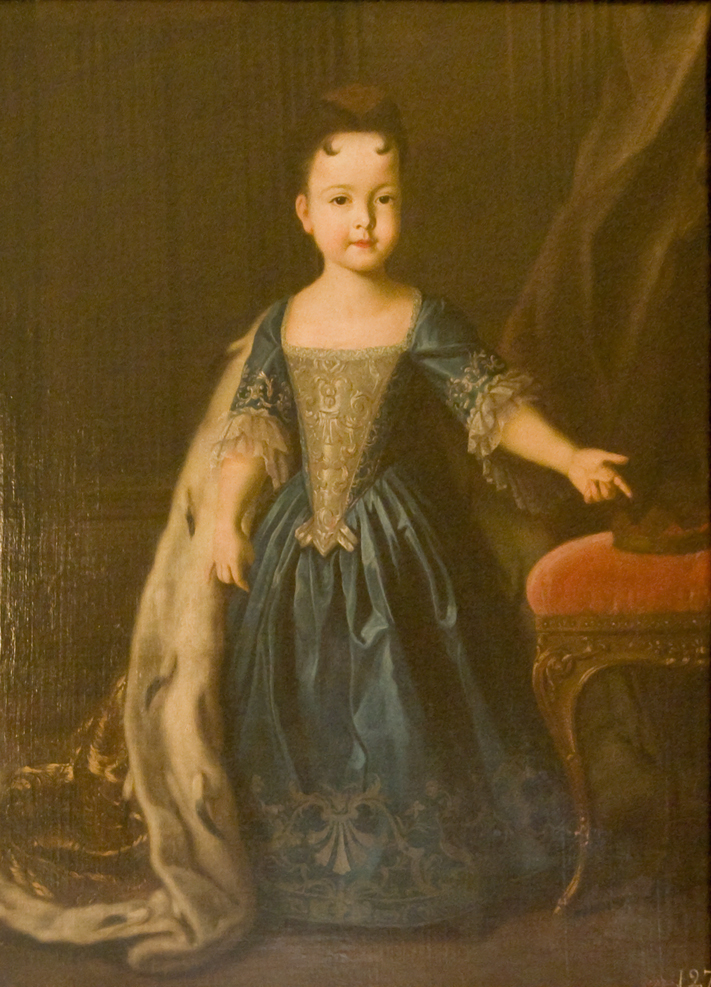
- Portrait by Louis Caravaque, 1722
- Born: 31 August 1718; Saint Petersburg, Tsardom of Russia
- Died: 15 March 1725 (aged 6); Saint Petersburg, Russian Empire
- House: Romanov
- Father: Peter I
- Mother: Catherine I

Grand Duchess Natalia Petrovna of Russia (20 August 1718 – 15 March 1725) was the youngest daughter of Peter the Great and his second wife, Catherine I.

== Life ==
Natalia was born in St. Petersburg, on 20 August 1718, during the peace negotiations with Sweden (Åland Congress). When Peter was at this time on the teachings of the galley fleet, and to learn about the birth of his daughter, made a feast, and sent his fleet to St. Petersburg.

This day August 20 at Trinity glorified Almighty God has bestowed His Imperial Majesty the brightest newborn daughter, she is called by the same name Natalia, and her name-Well this day August 26 at the memory of the holy martyr Adrian and Natalia.

— Description of the archive of the Alexander Nevsky Monastery in the reign of Emperor Peter the Great

Only Anna, Elizabeth, and Natalia were alive at the proclamation of the Russian Empire in 1721 and received the title tsesarevna. When Natalia Petrovna died in St. Petersburg of measles, on 4 March 1725. Though it had been more than a month after the death of her father, Peter was not yet buried, and the coffin of the young grand duchess was placed in the same room. She was buried alongside other young children in the Peter and Paul Cathedral in St. Petersburg.
