= Catherinehof =

- Екатеринго́ф
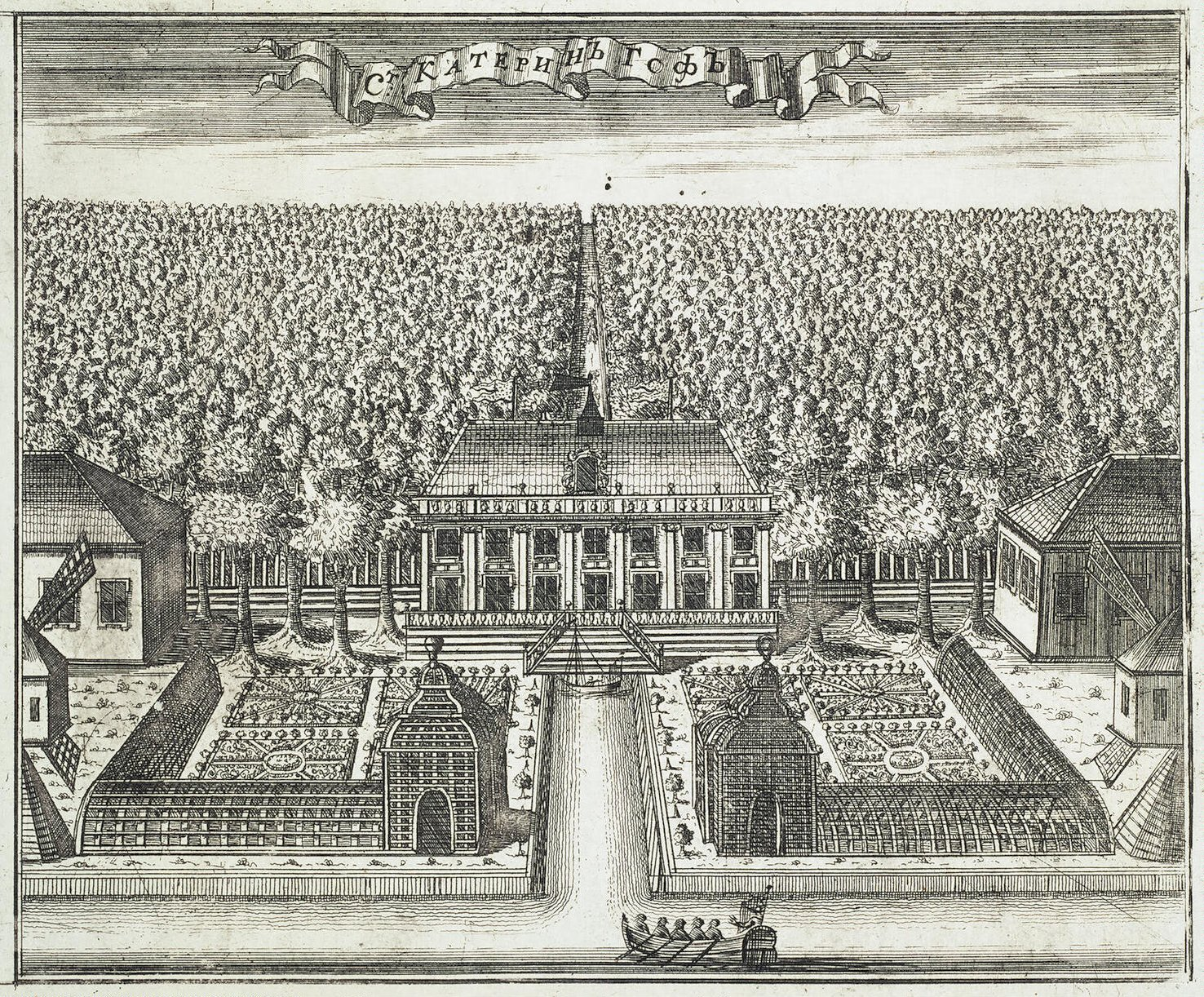
- Etching by Alexey Zubov, 1716.
- Alternative names: Ekaterinhof

General information
- Coordinates: 59°54′11″N 30°15′36″E
- Client: Catherine I of Russia

Ekaterinhof or Catherinehof (Russian: Екатеринго́ф < German: Katharinenhof "Catherine's Court") is a historic island park that began as an 18 century empress's estate in the south-west of St Petersburg, Russia. Its name originated in 1711, when Peter the Great presented the Island and adjacent lands along the eponymous Ekateringofka River to his wife Catherine (Catherine I of Russia), whose name they memorialize.

== History ==
The emperor apparently conceived Catherinehof as the first imperial estate located on the road leading from the capital to his main summer residence, Peterhof.

A pet project of Peter I, the estate was abandoned following his death. His niece Empress Anna (reigned in 1730-40) added two wings to the palace, but these were demolished in 1779. As the succeeding monarchs preferred to develop Tsarskoe Selo as their alternative summer residence, Catherinehof suffered from neglect until 1800, when Emperor Paul donated it to his mistress, Anna Gagarina.

Four years later, the estate passed to the City of St Petersburg, which developed it as a municipal amusement park, with many garden pavilions and a "vauxhall" for musical exercises constructed on the grounds. The main palace housed a library and a museum dedicated to Peter I. The Petrine park was considerably expanded and became so popular with St Petersburgers that allusions to it may be found in such works as Casanova's memoirs and Dostoyevsky's novels.

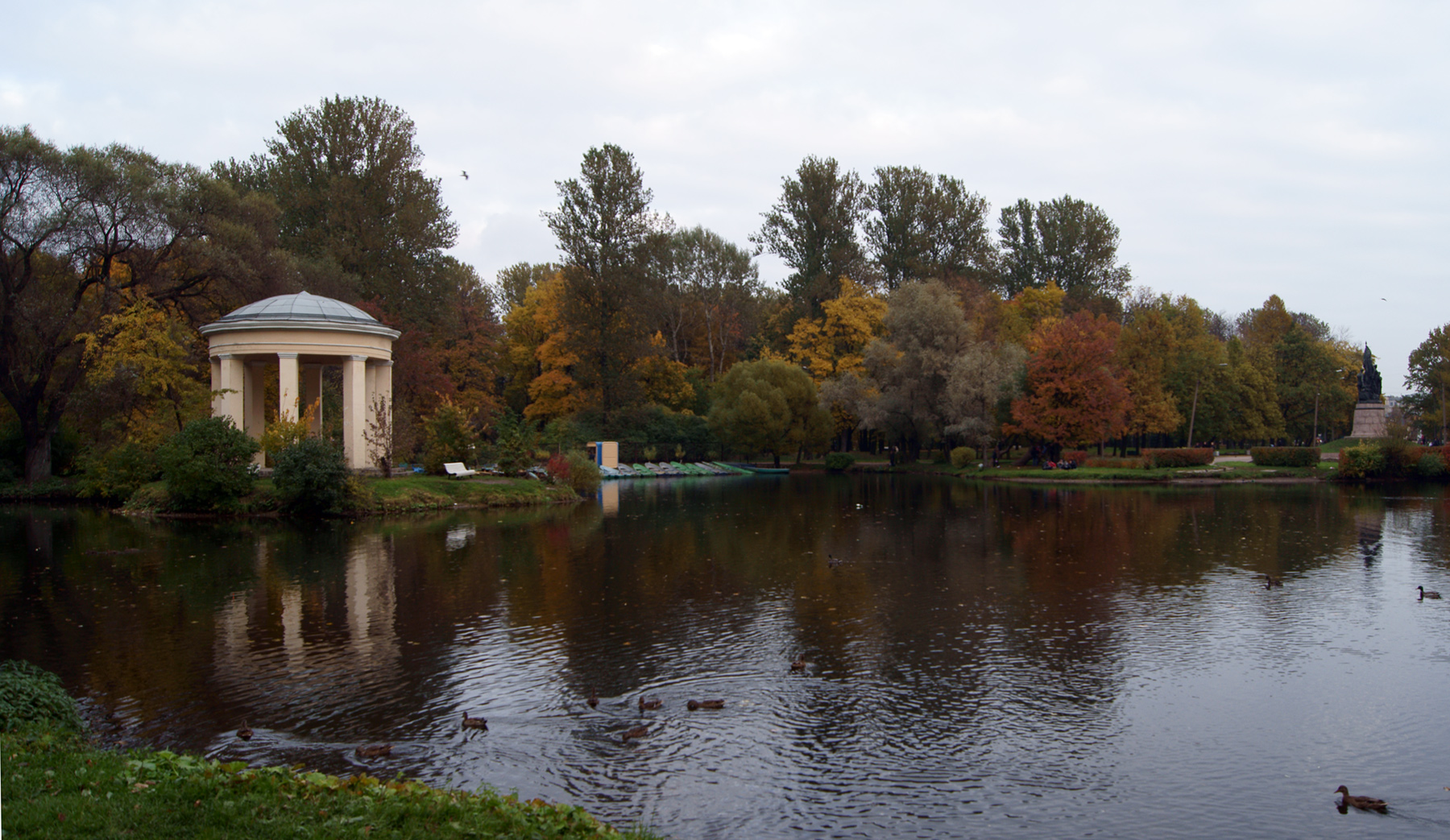
Catherinehof Park.

With the onset of the Industrial Revolution, the formerly quiet and reclusive neighbourhood became an industrial suburb of the Russian capital. The park fell into neglect after the palace had been destroyed by fire in 1924. Several years ago, a private fund announced plans to rebuild the derelict palace.

Three years after the World War II that greatly damaged the city the park was revived under a new name commemorating 30th anniversary of the national youth Communist league Komsomol, and in 1955 its front half was decorated with a large sculpture portraying the recently famous group of martyred young anti-Nazi underground resistance members of Young Guard cell from the Soviet Ukraine's southeast coal mining town of Krasnodon, whose struggle was described in a novel, named after the group, by Alexander Fadeeyev.

St. Catherine's Church was founded in Catherinehof in 1703 and, as local lore has it, witnessed the secret wedding of Peter I and Catherine in 1707. Konstantin Thon replaced the old church with a much larger structure in his hallmark Russo-Byzantine style; but the massive five-domed building was overhauled in the 1890s before being torn down by the Soviets in 1929.
