= Hendrikov =

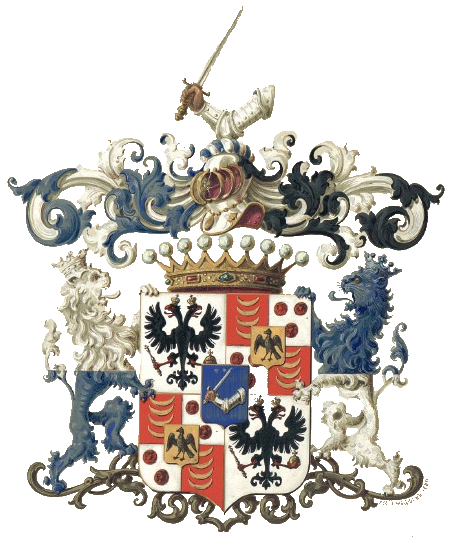
- Country: Russia
- Founded: 1742
- Founder: Simon Hendrik
- Final ruler: Alexander Vasilievich Hendrikov
- Titles: Count
- Estates: Rubizhne, Grafskoe

The Hendrikov family (Russian: Гендриковы, romanized: Gendrikovy) is the name of an extinct Russian noble family that was created as a result of the marriage between Lithuanian farmer, Simon Hendrik (1672-1728) and Christina Skavronska (1687-1729), sister of Empress Catherine I of Russia.

== Cousins of Empress Elizabeth I ==
In 1742, on the day of her coronation Elizabeth of Russia elevated the children of Simon and Christina. (who would be her cousins) to the rank of Count:

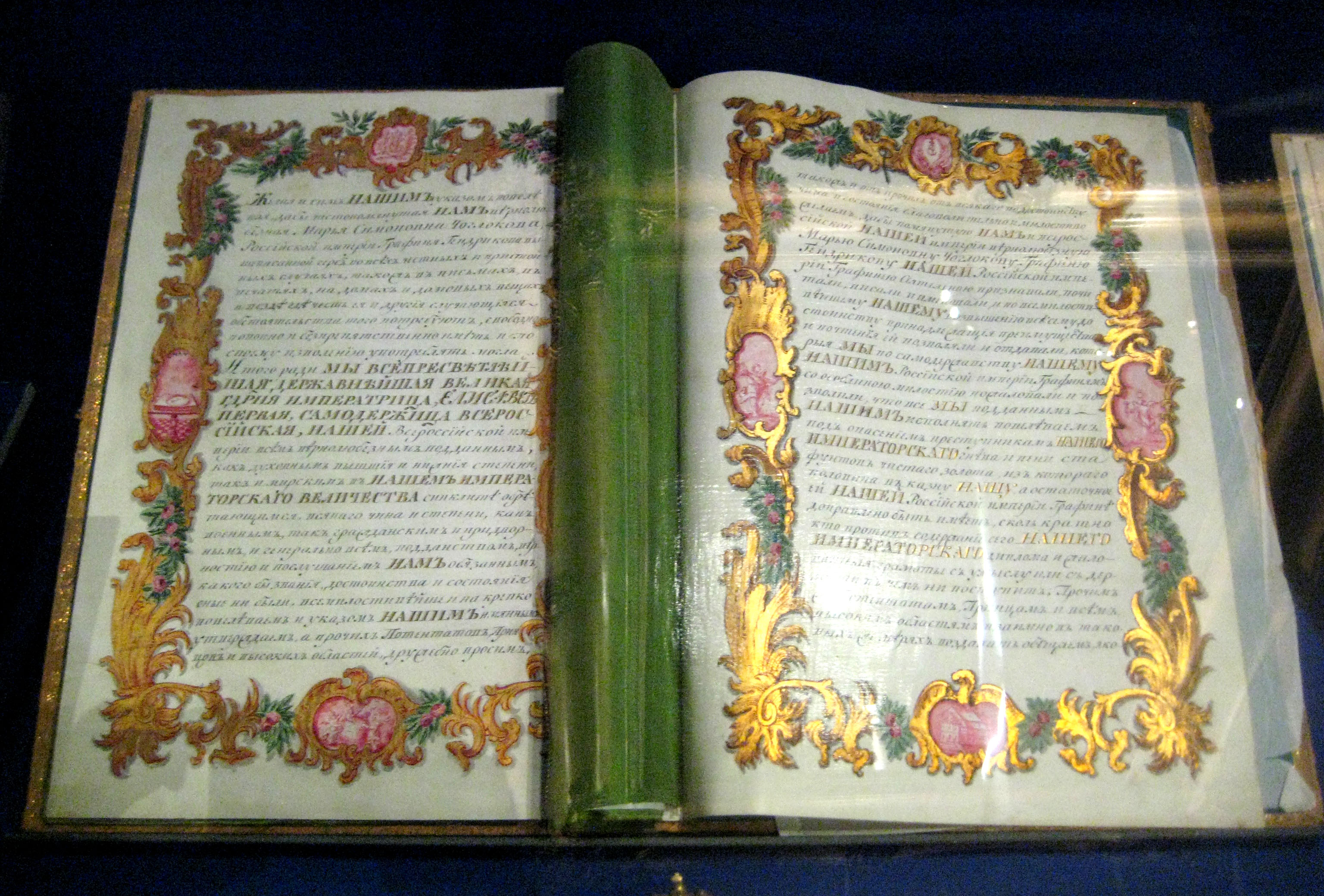
Empress Elizabeth's decree elevating her cousins to counts.

- Andrey Simonovich (1715-1748), chamberlain; married Anna Artemyevna Volynskaya (1723-1744), the eldest daughter and heiress of Artemy Volynsky, had no issue.
- Ivan Simonovich (1719-1779), owner of the Rubezhnoye estate, general-in-chief, chief of the Cavalry Corps; married Ekaterina Sergeevna Buturlina (d. 1784).
- Agafya Simonovna (1714-1741), wife of chamberlain Grigory Alexandrovich Petrovo-Solovovo (1703-1743), mother of the honorary guardian Alexander Petrovo-Solovovo, grandmother of the Minister of Internal Affairs Osip Kozodavlev.
- Maria Simonova (1723-1756), Lady-in-waiting to both Empress Elizabeth and Catherine the Great. She was the wife of Chief Hofmeister Nikolai Naumovich Choglokov (1718-1754) and later married Prosecutor General Alexander Ivanovich Glebov (1722-1790).
- Marfa Simonovna (1727-1753), lady of state, owner of the Terny estate. 1747 she married Lieutenant-General Mikhail Ivanovich Safonov (d. 1782); at one time she was considered the bride of the Prince Alexander of Kartli.
  - Elizaveta Safonova, wife of Prince AP Shcherbatov .
  - Marfa Safonova, wife of S. A. Dmitriev-Mamonov.

The Hendrikovs received vast plots in Sloboda, Ukraine from Empress Elizabeth, especially in the Volchansky and Zmievsky districts, and were included in the 5th part of the genealogy book of the Kharkov province.

From the two sons of Count Ivan Simonovich - Andrei and Sergei - two branches of the Hendrikov family originated, which existed throughout the 19th century. By the beginning of the 20th century, the younger branch of the Hendrikovs fell out of high society.

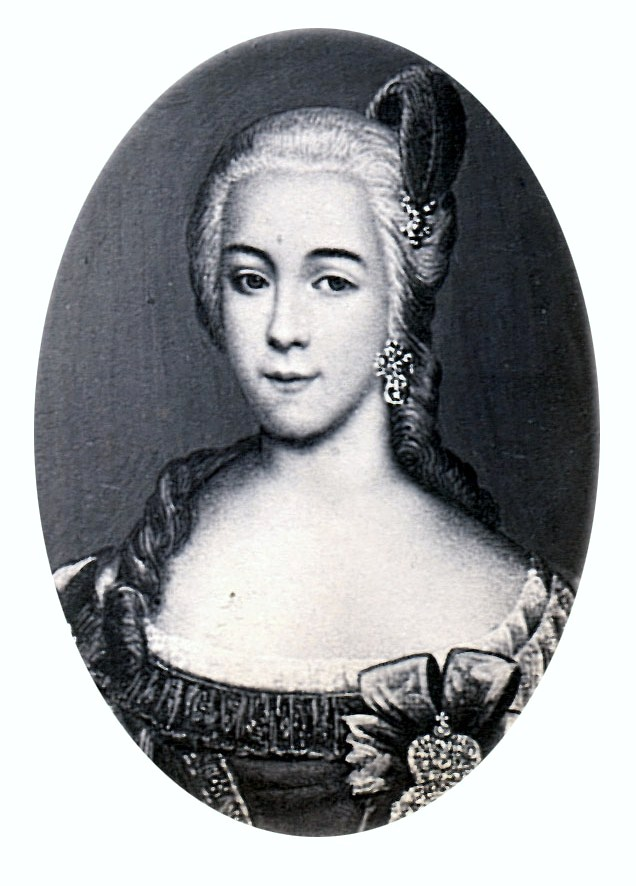
One of the first Countess Hendrikova's

== Senior Branch ==
Alexander Ivanovich Hendrikov (1807-1881), was the eldest great-grandson of Count Ivan Simonovich (son of Ivan Andreevich, grandson of Andrei Ivanovich), married first, Princess Praskovya Alexandrovna Khilkova (1802-1843) and second, Countess Evdokia Vasilievna Gudovich(1822-1901).

1. Alexander (1827-1851), cavalry guard, lieutenant, mortally wounded in a duel by Baron E.O. Rosen.
2. Dmitry (1831-1898), lieutenant general; married to Anna Fastovna Zanadvorskaya (1848-1885).
  1. Alexander (1875-1945), state councilor; married (since 1915) to Baroness Elena Anatolyevna von der Pahlen (1884-1938).
3. Stepan (1832-1901), privy councilor; married to Olga Ignatievna Shebeko (1836-1904), sister of Senator N. I. Shebeko.
  1. Alexander (1859-1919), Colonel-Black Hundred, founder of the Union of the Russian People; married Sofya Vladimirovna Khlebnikova (1871-1957).
    1. George (1908-1936), married Anna-Maria von Braun (1904-1984) in 1931.
4. Anna (1830-1886), wife of the Ryazan governor Nikolai Arkadievich Boldarev (1826-1904).
5. Nikolay (1855-1891), captain; married to Cecilia Valerianovna Shirkova, daughter of Valerian Shirkov, author of Ruslan and Lyudmila.
6. Vassili (1857-1912), master of ceremonies, Volchansky district leader of the nobility; in 1882, married Princess Sofya Petrovna Gagarina (1859-1915).
  1. Peter (1883-1943), governor of Courland and Oryol; married Olga Nikolaevna Zvegintseva (1892-1987) in 1914.
  2. Alexander (1885-1962), Captain of the Cavalry Regiment.
  3. Alexandra (1882-1919), wife (since 1900) of the guards officer Andrei Nikolaevich Balashov (1874-1916).
  4. Anastasia (1888-1918), Lady-in-waiting to Alexandra Feodorovna, martyr of the Russian Orthodox Church.

== Sources ==
- "Гендриковы" . Brockhaus and Efron Encyclopedic Dictionary (in Russian). 1906.
