= Vassili Hendrikov =

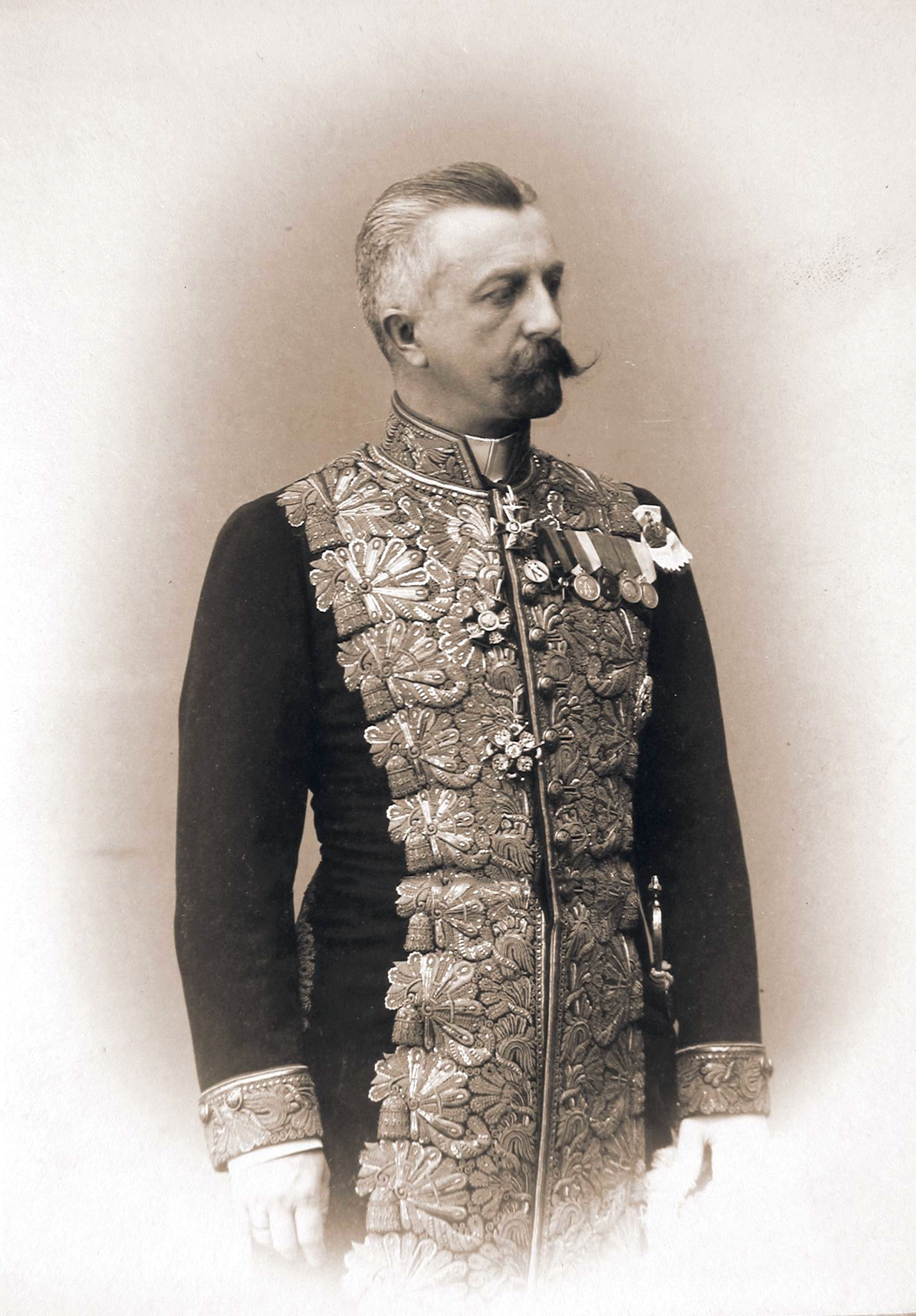
- Born: 11 July 1857
- Died: 17 March 1912 (aged 54); Saint Petersburg, Russian Empire
- Noble family: Hendrikov
- Spouse: Sofia Petrovna Gagarina
- Issue: Pyotr Hendrikov; Alexander Hendrikov; Alexandra Hendrikova; Anastasia Hendrikova
- Father: Alexander Ivanovich Hendrikov
- Mother: Evdokia Vasilievna Gudovich

Count Vassili Aleksandrovich Hendrikov (11 July 1857 – 17 March 1912) was a Russian noble leader of the district of Volchansk. He was also the chief master of ceremonies for the Hendrikov family.

== Biography ==
Hendrikov was born into the family of an inspector of state stud farms, Alexander Ivanovich Hendrikov (1806–1881) and his second wife, Evdokia Vasilievna Gudovich (1822–1901).

In 1870 he was assigned to the Page Corps as an external student. In 1874, he was transferred to a junior special class. On 10 August 1876, he was released from the chamber pages as a cornet to the Cavalry Regiment. In 1880 he was promoted to lieutenant.

On 21 August 1881, Hendrikov was awarded the "1 March 1881" medal for assisting Alexander II of Russia before he was assassinated. Hendrikov, who happened to be passing by at the moment of the first explosion, ran to help the Emperor. After the second bomb exploded, Hendrikov supported the fallen emperor and helped carry him to safety.

On 8 September 1883, he enlisted in the reserve of the guards' cavalry. On 16 April 1884, he was dismissed from the reserve with the rank of staff captain. On 6 May of the same year, he was granted the position of chamberlain. In 1885, he was elected marshal of the nobility for the Volchansk district, and re-elected in 1888.

In 1889, he was awarded the title of 'master of ceremonies' on his retirement. On 24 March 1896, he was awarded the title of court chamberlain, and appointed to serve under Empress Alexandra Feodorovna. On 12 January 1900, he was awarded the rank of master of ceremonies.

He died on 17 March 1912 from a haemorrhage and was buried in the Alexander Nevsky Lavra.

== Marriage and issue ==
In 1882 he married lady-in-waiting Sophia Petrovna (1859–1916), daughter of Prince Pyotr Dmitrievich Gagarin and Countess Anastasia Alexandrovna-Stenbock-Fermor. They had four children:

- Peter (1883–1942), the last Oryol governor.
- Alexandra (1884–1919), married an officer of the Guards, Andrei Nikolaevich Balashov (1874–1916)
- Alexander (1885–1962).
- Anastasia (1888–1918), lady-in-waiting to Empress Alexandra, was shot by the Bolsheviks and later canonised by the Russian Orthodox Church.
