= Catherine Schneider =

Tutor in Nicholas II of Russia's court (1856–1918)

Henrietta Catharina Luisa Schneider
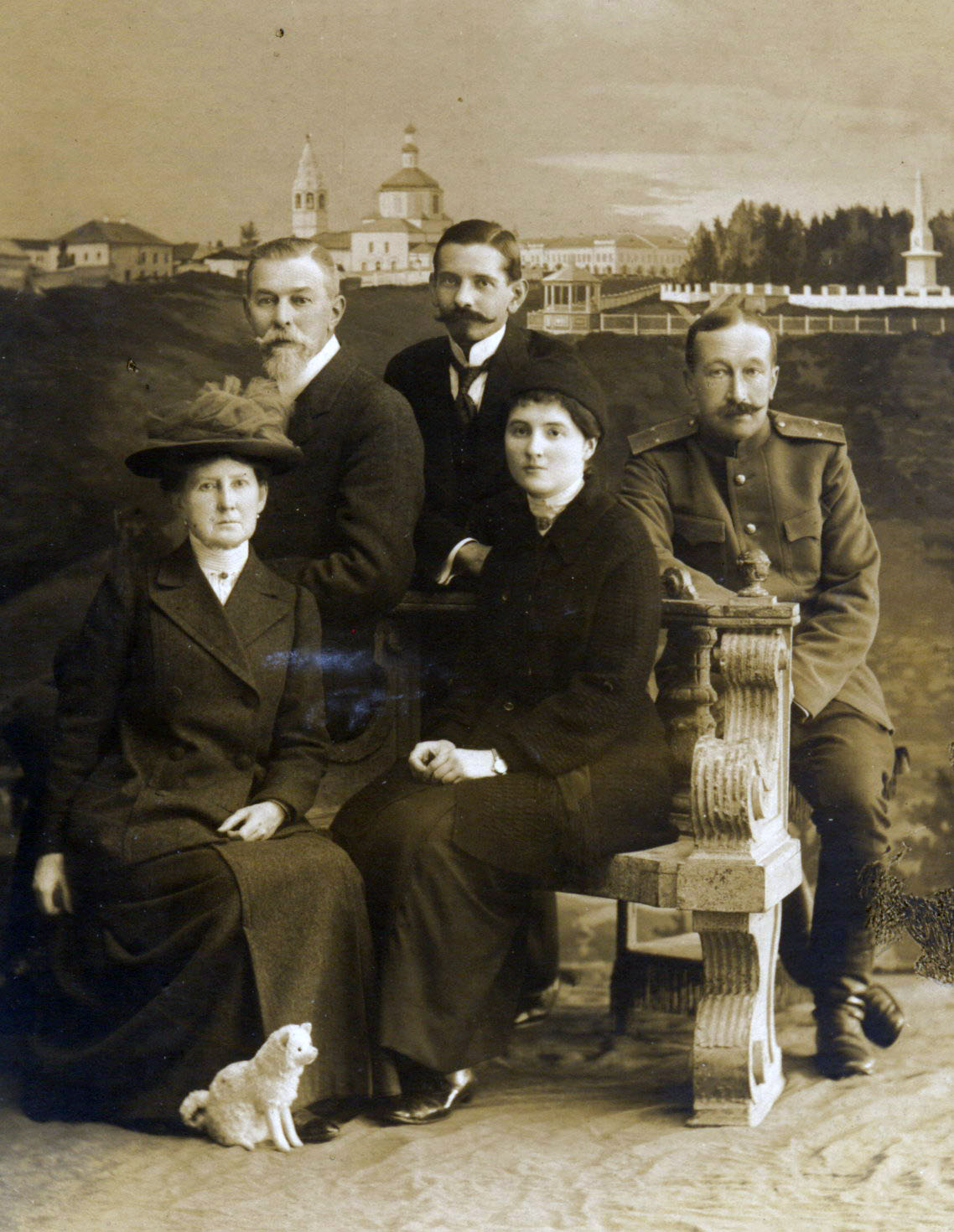
- Catharina Schneider (left) with Count Ilya Tatishchev, Pierre Gilliard, Countess Anastasia Hendrikova and Prince Vasily Dolgorukov
- Born: January 20, 1856; Saint Petersburg, Russia
- Died: September 4, 1918 (aged 62); Perm, Russia
- Cause of death: Blunt trauma
- Canonized: 1981 by Russian Orthodox Church Outside Russia

Henrietta Catharina Luisa Schneider (Russian: Екатерина Адольфовна Шнейдер, tr. Ekaterina Adolʹfovna Shneyder; 20 January 1856 – 4 September 1918) was a Baltic German tutor at the court of Tsar Nicholas II and Tsarina Alexandra. She taught Alexandra Russian before her marriage, just as she had some years earlier taught Russian to the Tsarina's sister, Grand Duchess Elizabeth Fyodorovna before her marriage to Grand Duke Sergei Alexandrovich of Russia.

Schneider was murdered by the Bolsheviks at Perm in the fall of 1918 along with lady in waiting Anastasia Hendrikova. Schneider and Hendrikova were canonized as martyrs by the Russian Orthodox Church Outside Russia in 1981, in spite of the fact she was a Lutheran.

== Biography ==
Schneider, nicknamed "Trina," was born in Saint Petersburg to a Baltic German family and was the niece of the former imperial physician Dr. Hirsch. Her father was a Hof-Councillor. A courtier remembered her as "infinitely sweet tempered and good hearted." Schneider was also primly Victorian. She once refused to permit the four grand duchesses to put on a play because it contained the word "stockings." Schneider was devoted to the Empress and willingly followed her into imprisonment following the Russian Revolution of 1917. She was separated from the family at Ekaterinburg and imprisoned for months at Perm. In September 1918 the elderly Schneider and the thirty-one-year-old Hendrikova were driven to a forest outside Perm, told to march forward, and were killed with a rifle butt.

The bodies of Hendrikova and Schneider were recovered by the Whites in May 1919, though the whereabouts of their final resting place remains a mystery.

== See also ==
- New Martyr
- Romanov sainthood

== Notes ==
- Rappaport, Helen. Four Sisters: The Lost Lives of the Romanov Grand Duchesses. Pan Macmillan, 2014. ISBN 978-1-4472-5935-0
