= Khodynka Tragedy =

Human stampede in Russia in 1896

Coordinates: 55°47′14″N 37°31′52″E

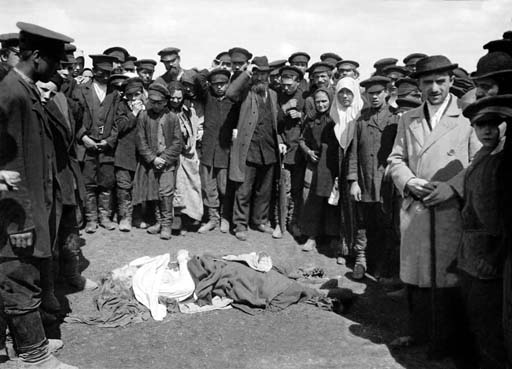
- A victim of the crush
- Date: 30 May 1896
- Location: Khodynka Field, Moscow, Russian Empire
- Deaths: 1,282
- Injuries: 1,200–20,000

The Khodynka Tragedy (Russian: Ходынская трагедия) was a crowd crush that occurred on 30 May [O.S. 18 May] 1896, on Khodynka Field in Moscow, Russia. The crush happened during the festivities after the coronation of the last Emperor of Russia, Nicholas II. While 1,282 corpses were collected from the scene, injury estimates range widely from 1,200 to 20,000.

== Background ==
Nicholas II and his wife Alexandra were crowned Emperor and Empress of Russia on 26 May [O.S. 14 May] 1896. Four days later, a banquet was going to be held for the people at Khodynka Field. Within the area, a town square, theatres, 150 buffets for the distribution of gifts, and 20 pubs were built for the celebrations. Near the celebration square was a field that had a ravine and many gullies. On the evening of 29 May, people who had heard rumours of coronation gifts began to gather in anticipation. The gifts which everyone was to receive were a bread roll, a sausage, pretzels, gingerbread and a commemorative cup.

== Crush ==
At about 6 a.m. several thousand people (estimates reached 500,000) were already gathered on the field. Rumours spread that there was not enough beer or pretzels for everybody, and that the enamel cups contained gold coins. A police force of 1,800 men failed to maintain civil order, and a catastrophic crowd crush occurred.

=== Death toll ===
A total of 1,282 corpses were collected from the scene, and the injured numbered between 9,000 and 20,000, according to different estimates. Another commonly cited figure reports "more than 2,600 casualties, including 1,389 deaths".

Most of the victims were trapped in a ditch and were trampled or suffocated there. Despite the tragedy, the program of festivities continued as planned elsewhere on the large field, with many people unaware of what had happened. The Emperor and Empress made an appearance in front of the crowds on the balcony of the Tsar's Pavilion in the middle of the field around 2 p.m. By that time, the traces of the incident had been cleaned up.

== Tsar's response ==
The parties, receptions and balls after the Coronation were darkened by the catastrophe at Khondinka [sic], where 2,000 people were crushed to death. The same day as the catastrophe, I was taking a walk along the Khondinka [sic] and I met many groups of people coming back from that site and carrying the Tsar's gifts. The strange thing, though, was that not one person mentioned the catastrophe, and I did not hear about it until the next morning, at the Governor General's palace, where General Prefect of Police Vlasovski brought a special report. Grand Duke Serge Alexandrovich was very depressed by what had happened; he gave Vlasovski orders to return to him every hour with detailed reports on the progress of the investigation into the causes of the disaster.

— Alexei Volkov

A festive ball had been scheduled that night at the French embassy. When Nicholas heard of the stampede, "he did not display the slightest emotion and that night attended a ball given in his honor". Grand Duke Alexander Mikhailovich warned the tsar not to go to the French ball, but Nicholas II attended nonetheless. Li Hongzhang, China's Imperial Commissioner on a European tour, was the most notable witness. Li was amused and said a Chinese emperor would not have attended the ball.

The next morning, Nicholas and Empress Alexandra attended a funeral service for the dead, and then spent the rest of the day visiting the injured in several hospitals. Nicholas donated 1,000 rubles to each family of the dead or injured, and established special orphanages for the children of the victims. The state paid for the funerals.

The government distributed a large amount of aid to the families of the dead, and a number of minor officials were dismissed. The negligence and the tone-deaf response of the imperial authorities, however, caused further public indignation. Grand Duke Alexander Mikhailovich wrote in his memoirs that "The radiant smile on the face of Grand Duke Sergei prompted foreigners to remark that the Romanovs lacked judgment." Grand Duke Sergei Alexandrovich, then Governor-General of Moscow, became known as "the Prince of Khodynka" and the Emperor received the nickname of "Nicholas the Bloody".

Nicholas II wrote in his diary:

19th of May. Saturday. Until now, everything was going, thank God, like clockwork, but today there was a great mishap. The crowd staying overnight at Khodynka, awaiting the start of the distribution of lunch and mugs pushed against buildings and there was a terrible crush, and awful to say trampled around 1300 people!! I found out about it at 10 1/2 hours before the report by [minister of war] Vannovski; a disgusting impression was left by this news. At 12 1/2 we had lunch and then Alix [Czarina] and I went to Khodynka to be present at this sad "national holiday." Actually there was nothing going on: we looked from the pavilion at the huge crowd that surrounded the stage from which the orchestra played all the time the anthem and "Glory." Went to Petrovsky [palace], where at the gate I received several delegations and then entered the yard. Here dinner was served under four tents for all township heads. I had to make a speech, and then another for the assembled marshals of the nobility. After going around the table, we left for the Kremlin. Dinner at Mama's at 8. Went to the ball at [French ambassador] Montebello's. It was very nicely arranged, but the heat was unbearable. After dinner, left at 2.

== Legacy ==
Leo Tolstoy was so moved by the tragedy that he wrote the unfinished short story "Khodynka: An Incident of the Coronation of Nicholas II".

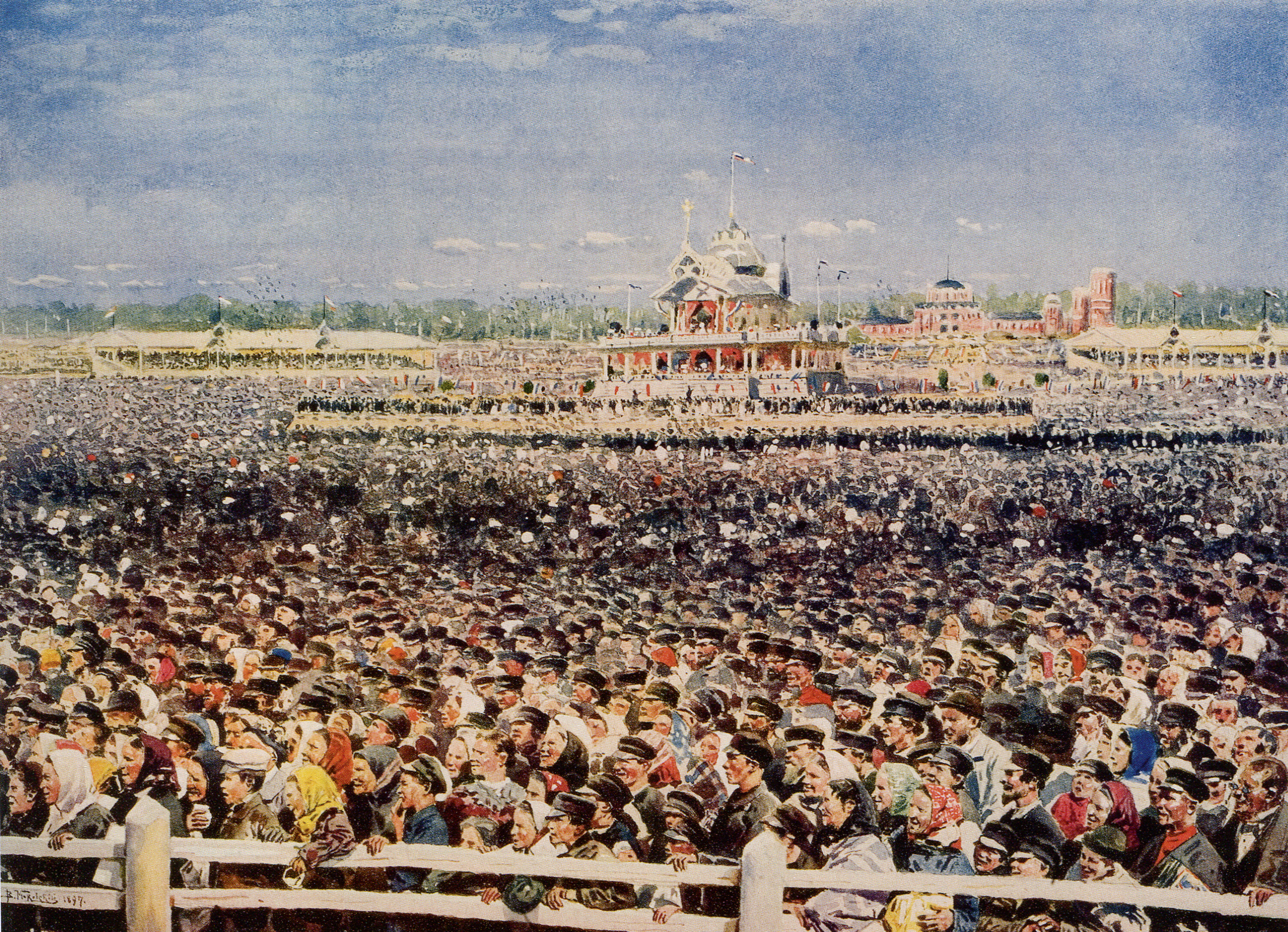
Spectators gathered at Khodynka

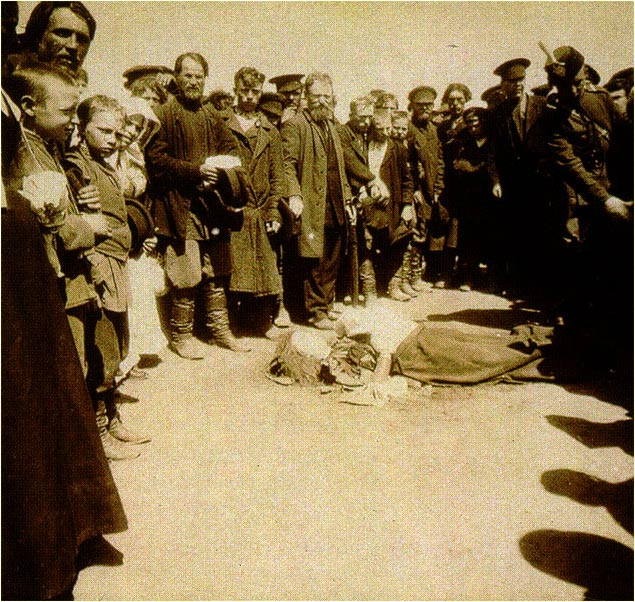
Victims of the stampede at Khodynka

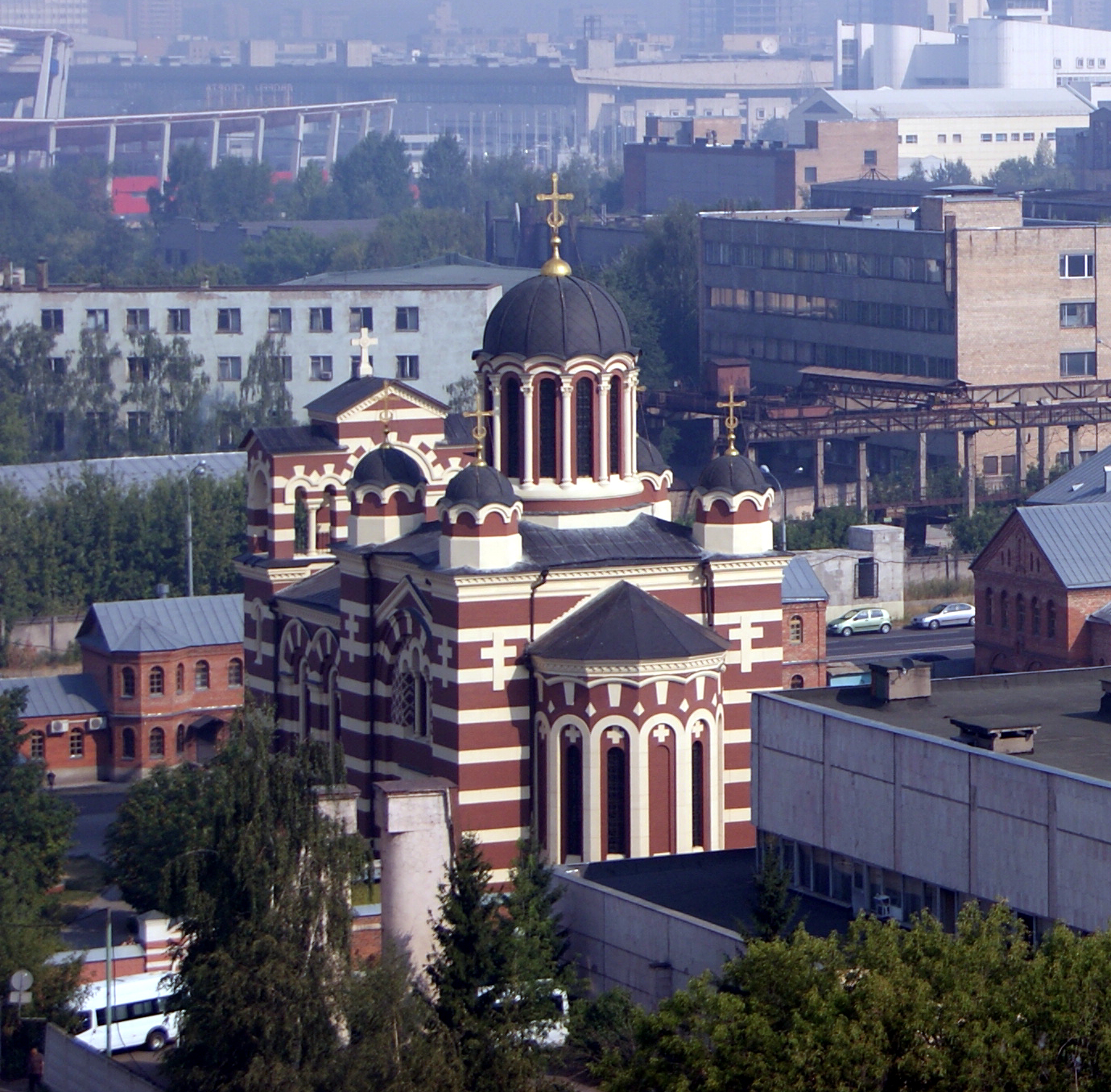
An Orthodox church on Khodynka Field commemorating the incident
