= Khodynka Cup of Sorrows =

Commemorative Russian cup from 1896

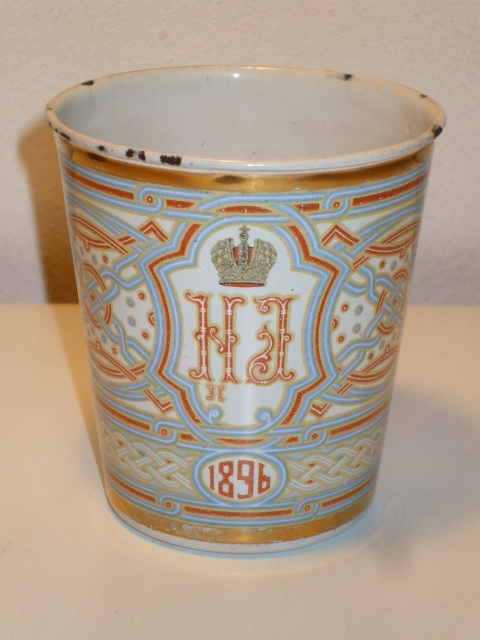
Khodynka cup

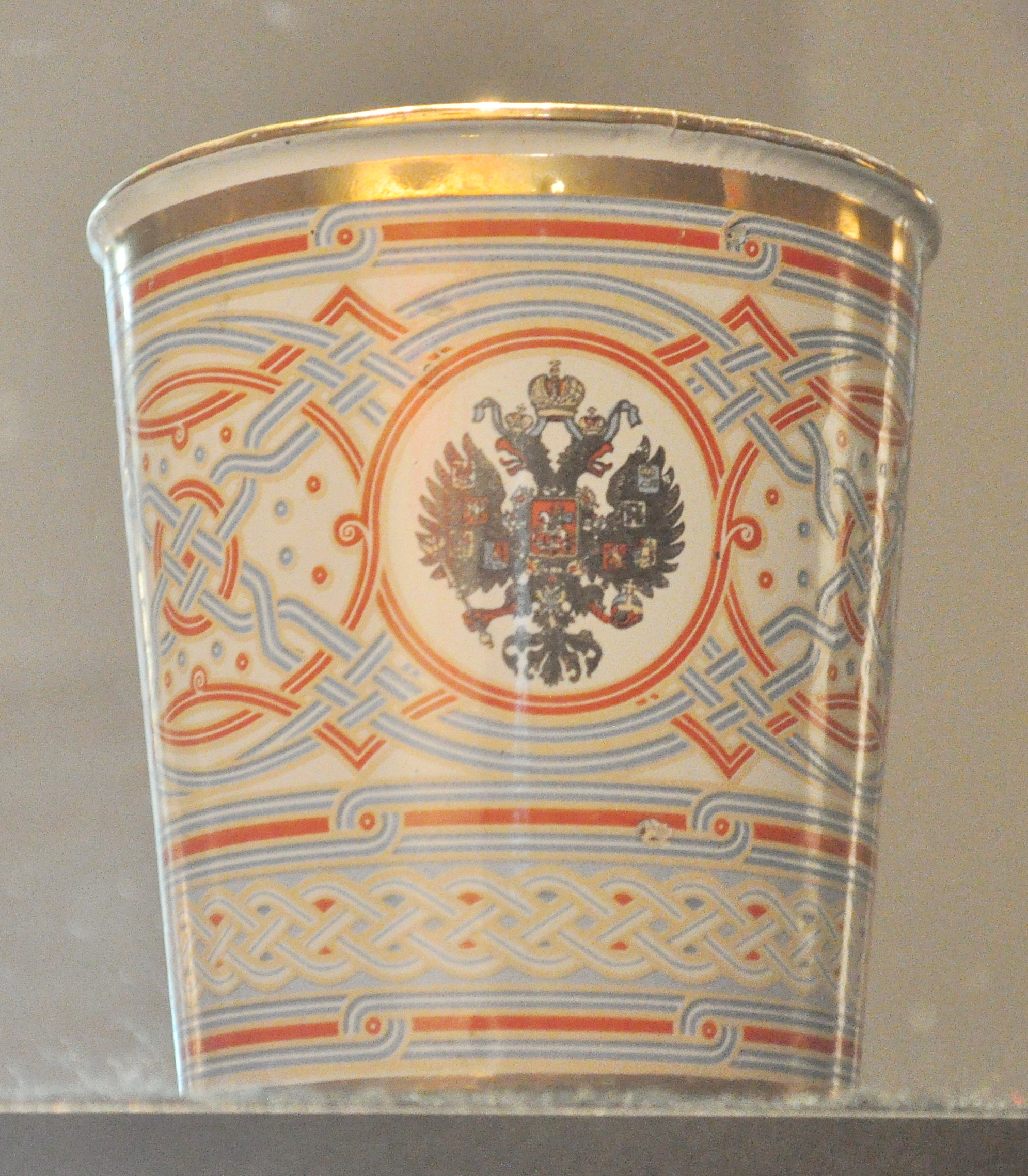
The reverse, with the Romanov Eagle

The Khodynka Cup of Sorrows, also known as the Coronation Cup, the Sorrow Cup, or the Blood Cup, was a model of enamelled metal cups made for public distribution at the coronation of Tsar Nicholas II and Tsarina Alexandra Feodorovna in 1896. The cup bears the initials of Nicholas and Alexandra, surrounded by a geometric pattern, with a Romanov eagle on the opposite side.

== History ==
=== At the coronation ===
The beaker is among many that were distributed, along with food presents and commemorative scarves, to celebrate the coronation of Nicholas II, as had been the long-standing tradition. On the morning of 30 May [O.S. 18 May] 1896, over half a million revelers gathered on the ragged Khodynka Field in Moscow, in anticipation of the presents and especially the commemorative cups (as enameled tableware was still a great novelty at the time). That was far more than the field could safely accommodate, especially considering the many trenches and pits that dotted the plain in front of the Tsar's podium, because the entire area was normally used as a military training ground.

A rumor swept through the crowd that there was not enough food for everyone and the cups contained a gold coin. In the confusion and crowd crush that ensued, over a thousand people were killed in what has become known as the Khodynka Tragedy. This event was taken as an omen of things to come for the rest of Nicholas' reign.

=== Legacy ===
The coronation cup became known in Russia as the Cup of Sorrows, and the Tsar himself got the nickname of "Bloody Nicholas" as a result – despite his best efforts to compensate the families of the victims.
