= Mestmaker family =

Mestmaker
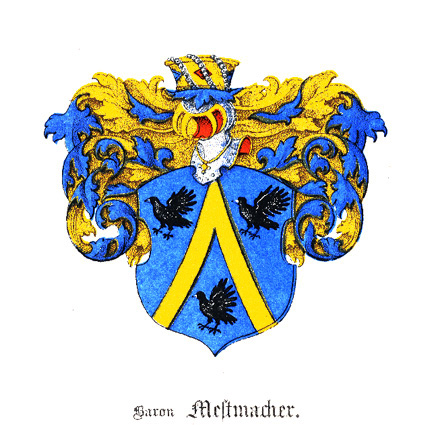
- Country: Russian Empire
- Founded: 1732
- Founder: Ivan Ivanovich Mestmacher
- Titles: Baron

The Mestmaker family (Russian: Местмахеры, romanized: Mestmakhery; German: Mestmacher) is a Russian noble family of German origin, originally from Lübeck. Members of the family held the title of Baron in the Russian Empire. The family went extinct in 1909.

== History ==
The name can be traced back to Ivan Ivanovich Mestmaker (German Johann von Mestmacher; 1732–1805), who was the resident minister under the Prince-bishop of Lübeck, later envoy to Dresden. He was elevated to baronial level in 1777.

The name is included in the noble Matricula of the Courland Governorate and in the V part of the pedigree book of the Podolian Governorate.

The State Council approved Baron Pavel Mestmaker's, nephew Viktor Viktorovich Buddha (1881-1914) allowed to add to his surname - the surname and title of his adoptive parent, Baron Mestmaker and be called Baron Mestmaker-Buddha, with the right to use the family coat of arms.

== Coat of Arms ==
The shield has a blue field and depicts an elevated golden rafter. On either side and in the middle are three black doves.

The shield is crowned with a baronial crown. The basting on the shield is blue, enclosed in gold.

== Lineage ==
- Ivan Ivanovich Mestmaker 1st Baron von Mestmaker (born 17.08.1733, Revel, d.10.12.1805, St. Petersburg). Wife : Baroness Wilhelmina-Juliana-Sophia von Wedel-Jarlsberg (b. 05/31/1752, Copenhagen, d. 02/22/1789)
  - Baron Fyodor Ivanovich Mestmaker (born 05/12/1774, d. 05/08/1817). Wife : Louise-Rosina von Zeiten (Louise Rosine von Zeiten; b. 12/28/1789, d. 02/05/1834, St. Petersburg).
    - Baron Pavel Fedorovich Mestmaker (born 05.08.1807, d.?). Wife : Elizabeth (or Olga) Pavlovna Divova, daughter of Pavel Gavrilovich Divov (born 01/18/1765, d. 09/19/1841) and Elena Stepanovna, née. Strekalova (born 02.01.1786, d.21.02.1868).
      - Baron Pavel Pavlovich Mestmaker
      - Baroness Elena Pavlovna Mestmaker
      - Baroness Olga Pavlovna Mestmaker (d. After 11/25/1856)
      - Baroness Alexandra Pavlovna Mestmaker (born 11/10/1850, d. 06/12/1909). Husband: Victor Emmanuilovich Buddha (born 03/01/1836, d. 02/02/1903 (07/02/1901?)).
        - Alexandra Viktorovna Buddha (b. 09/18/1879, d. 1919). Husband: Mikhail Oskarovich Paton (born 05.08.1865, Nice, France, d. 1919), son of Oscar-Johann-Yakov Petrovitch Paton (born 08.11.1823) and Ekaterina Dmitrievna, née. Shishkova (born about 1834).
        - Victor Viktorovich Buddha, 1st Baron Mestmaker-Buddha (born 15.04.1881, d.19.07.1914, Kharkov). Wife : Lyudmila Alekseevna, née Dmitrieva (b. 07/30/1884, d. 11/08/1953, Brussels, Belgium).
          - Baron Viktor Viktorovich Mestmaker-Buddha (born 03.06.1906, St. Petersburg, d.20.03.1987, Emburg, Belgium). Wife : Svetlana Kornelievna, née. N.
            - Baroness Ludmila Viktorovna Mestmaker-Buddha.
        - Olga Viktorovna Buddha
        - Natalia Viktorovna Buddha (born 25.10.1884, died 1971). Husband : Evgeny Paton (born 03/04/1870, died 08/12/1953), brother of M.O. Paton.
    - Baron Nikolai Fedorovich Mestmaker.
    - Baroness Wilhelmina Fedorovna Mestmaker (born 06/15/1812, d. 07/13/1852). Husband : Sergei Andreevich Faminitsyn (born 18.10.1803, d. 14.03.1879), son of Andrei Egorovich Famitsyn and Praskovya Ivanovna, née. Romanchukova
    - Baroness Luiza Fedorovna Mestmaker (b. 1816, d. 11/28/1874, St. Petersburg).
  - Baron Peter-Friedrich-Ludwig Mestmaker (Peter Friedrich Ludwig; born 03/10/1779, Entin, died 05/05/1815, St. Petersburg).
  - Baroness NN Ivanovna Mestmaker. Husband : Prince Alexander Yakovlevich Khilkov (born 04.04.1755, died 04.1819), son of Prince Yakov Vasilyevich Khilkov and Elizaveta Nikitichna, née. Zotova

== Sources ==
- "Местмахер" . Brockhaus and Efron Encyclopedic Dictionary (in Russian). 1906.
