= Catherine I of Russia =

Empress of Russia from 1725 to 1727

Catherine I
- Tsarina
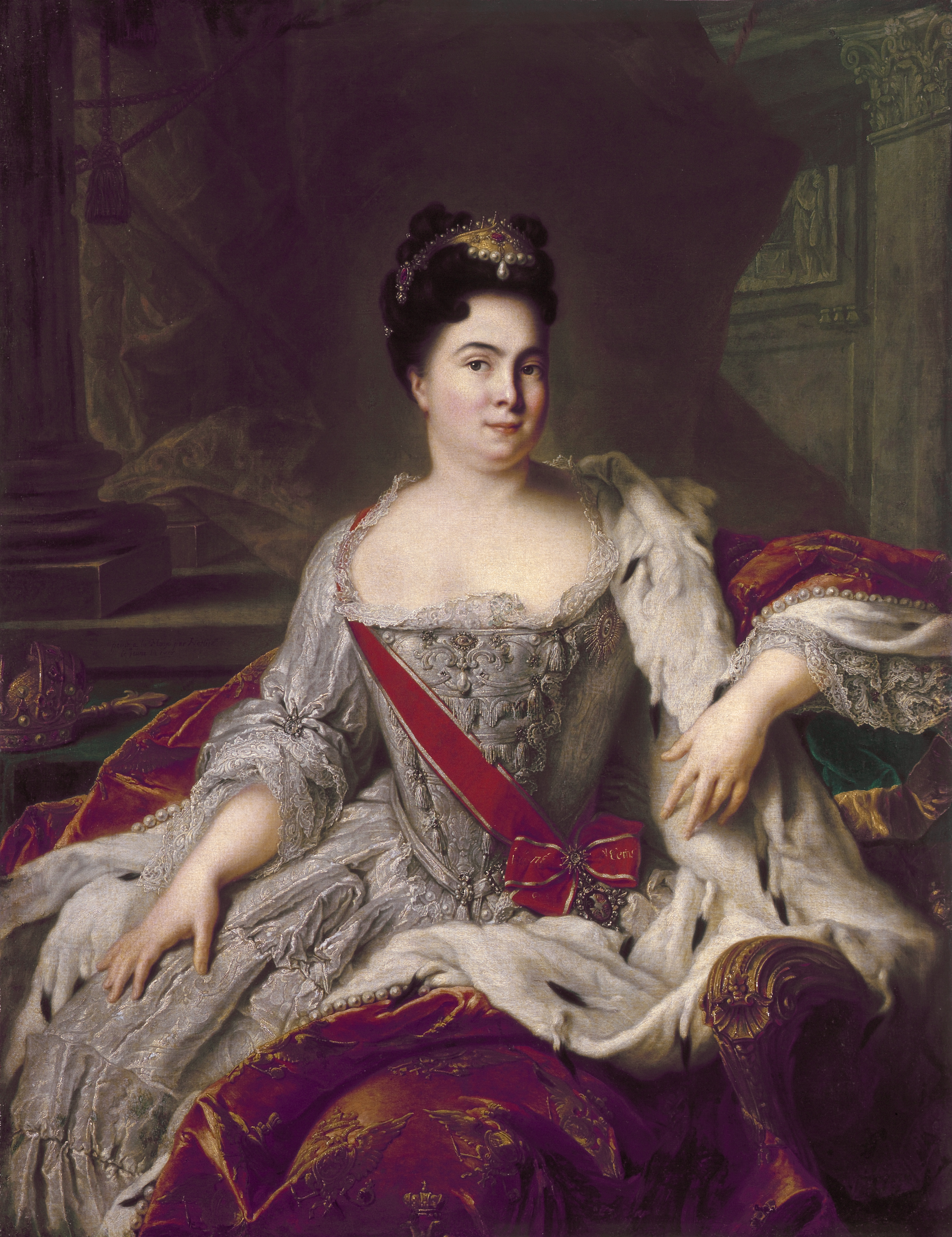
- Portrait, 1717

Empress of Russia
- Reign: 8 February 1725 – 17 May 1727
- Coronation: 7 May 1724
- Predecessor: Peter I
- Successor: Peter II

Empress consort of Russia
- Tenure: 2 November 1721 – 8 February 1725

Tsaritsa consort of Russia
- Tenure: 9 February 1712 – 2 November 1721
- Born: Marta Helena Samuilovna Skavronskaya; 15 April 1684
- Died: 17 May 1727 (aged 43); Tsarskoye Selo, Saint Petersburg, Russia
- Burial: Peter and Paul Cathedral
- Spouse: Johan Cruse (Note: or Johann Rabbe) (m. 1702; died 1702) Peter I of Russia (m. 1707; died 1725)
- Issue among others: Anna, Duchess of Schleswig-Holstein-Gottorp; Elizabeth, Empress of Russia; Peter Petrovich, Tsarevich of Russia; Grand Duchess Natalia Petrovna of Russia
Names
- Polish: Marta Helena Skowrońska; Russian: Marta Samuilovna Skavronskaya; Russian: Ekaterína Alekséyevna Mikháylova; Latvian: Marta Skravronska
- House: Romanov (by marriage); Skavronsky (Note: The House of Skavronsky, relatives of Catherine I, was founded on 5 January 1727 when her two brothers were granted the title of counts of the Russian Empire.) (by birth)
- Father: Samuel Skowroński

Catherine I (Note: Russian: Екатери́на I Алексе́евна Миха́йлова, romanized: Yekaterina I Alekseyevna Mikhaylova) (born Marta Helena Skowrońska; Russian: Екатерина Алексеевна Михайлова; 15 April 1684 - 17 May 1727) was Empress of Russia from 8 February 1725 until her death in 1727. She was previously empress consort of Russia from 1721 to 1725 as the second wife of Peter the Great, and tsaritsa consort from 1712 to 1721.

== Early life ==
Her place of birth and the details of her early life have not yet been precisely determined. Most often, it is claimed that the future empress was born in Dorpat (now Tartu, Estonia). According to another version, she was born in the territory of modern Latvia - either in Swedish Livonia or in the Duchy of Courland, namely in Jacobstadt (now Jēkabpils, Latvia).

Said to have been born on 15 April 1684 (O.S. 5 April), she was originally named Marta Helena Skowrońska. Marta was the daughter of Samuel Skowroński (also spelled Samuil Skavronsky), a Roman Catholic farmer from the eastern parts of the former Polish–Lithuanian Commonwealth, his parents were born in the area of Minsk (now Belarus). In 1680, he married Dorothea Hahn at Jakobstadt (now Jēkabpils, Latvia). Her mother is named in at least one source as Elizabeth Moritz, a daughter of a Baltic German woman, and there is debate as to whether Moritz's father was a Swedish officer. It is likely that two stories were conflated, and Swedish sources suggest that the Elizabeth Moritz story is probably incorrect.

According to the version presented in the Brockhaus and Efron Dictionary, Marta's mother, after becoming a widow, placed her daughter in service with the family of Pastor Glück, where she was allegedly taught literacy and needlework. Another version holds that the girl lived with her aunt, Anna-Maria Veselovskaya, until she was 12 years old, before ending up with the Glück family.

Marta's parents died during a plague epidemic around 1689, leaving five children. At the age of three Marta was taken by an her aunt and sent to Marienburg, Swedish Livonia (now Alūksne, Latvia) where she was raised by Johann Ernst Glück, a Lutheran pastor and Bible translator. According to some sources, she served in the Glück household as a lowly servant, scullery maid and washerwoman. No effort was made to teach her to read and write and she remained functionally illiterate throughout her life. She spoke four languages fluently: Russian, German, Swedish, Polish, and she also understood some French.

Marta was considered a very beautiful young girl, and there are accounts that Glück's wife became fearful that she would become involved with their son or husband. After the outbreak of the Great Northern War (1700–1721), at the age of 17, she was married off to a Swedish dragoon, Johan Cruse or Johann Rabbe, with whom she remained for eight days in 1702, at which point the Swedish troops were withdrawn from Marienburg. When Russian forces captured the town, Pastor Glück offered to work as a translator, and Field Marshal Boris Sheremetev agreed to his proposal and took him to Moscow. After the capture of Marienburg by the Russians, Marta was taken into service by Sheremetev. She travelled back to the Russian court with Sheremetev's army. From Sheremetev Marta was passed to Menshikov.

Afterwards Marta became part of the household of Alexander Menshikov, who was the best friend of the then Tsar Peter I. Anecdotal sources suggest that she was purchased by Menshikov. Whether the two of them were lovers is disputed, as at the time Count Menshikov was already engaged to his future wife. It is evident however that Menshikov and Marta formed a lifetime political alliance.

It is possible that Menshikov, who was quite jealous of the tsar's attentions and knew his tastes, wanted to procure a mistress on whom he could rely. In 1703, while visiting Count Menshikov at his home, Tsar Peter I met Marta. By 1704, she was already well established in the tsar's household as his mistress, and gave birth to a son, Peter. In 1703, she converted to Orthodoxy and took the new name Catherine Alexeyevna (Yekaterina Alexeyevna). She and Darya Menshikova accompanied Tsar Peter I and Prince Menshikov on their military excursions.

== Empress consort ==
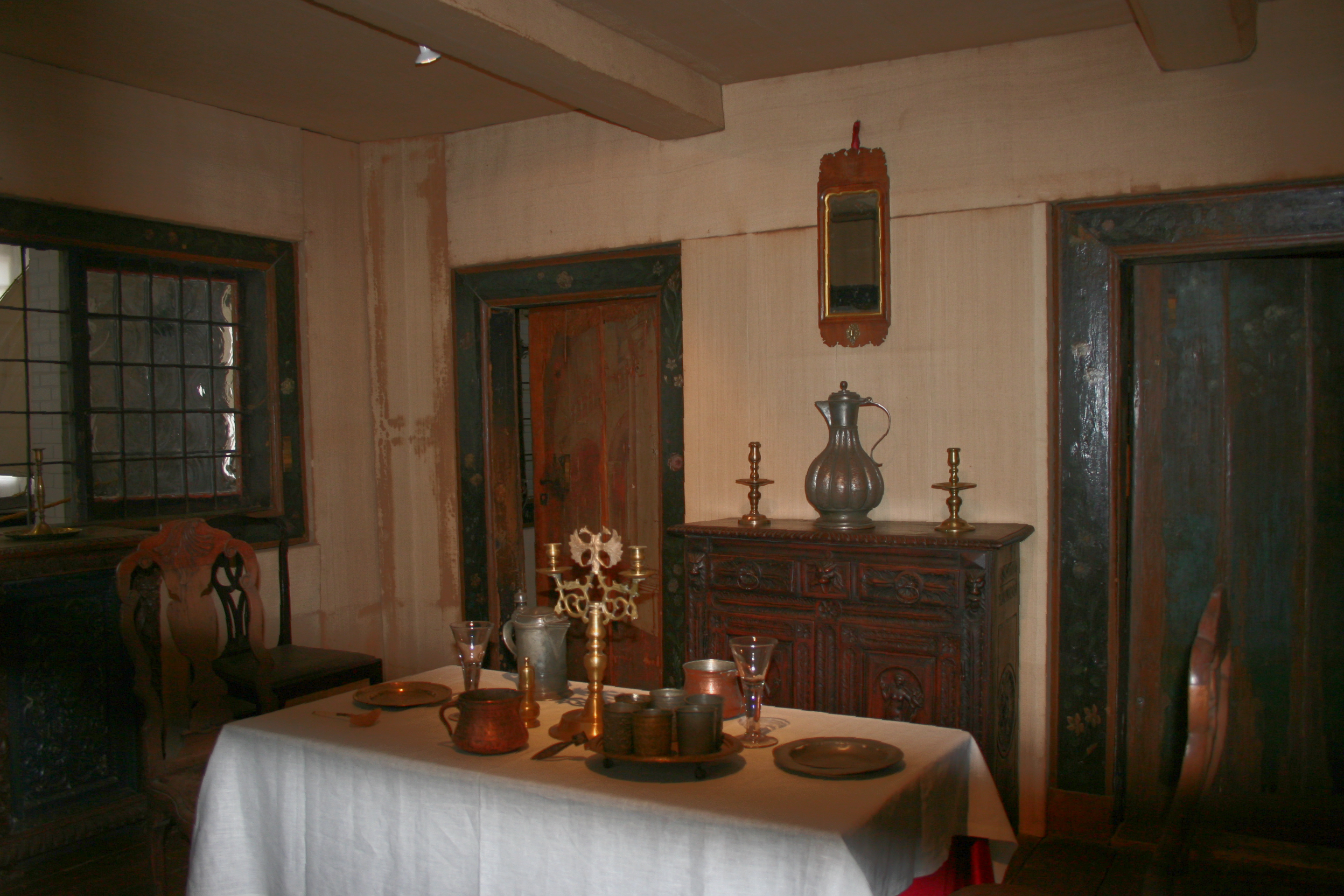
Interior of their log cabin

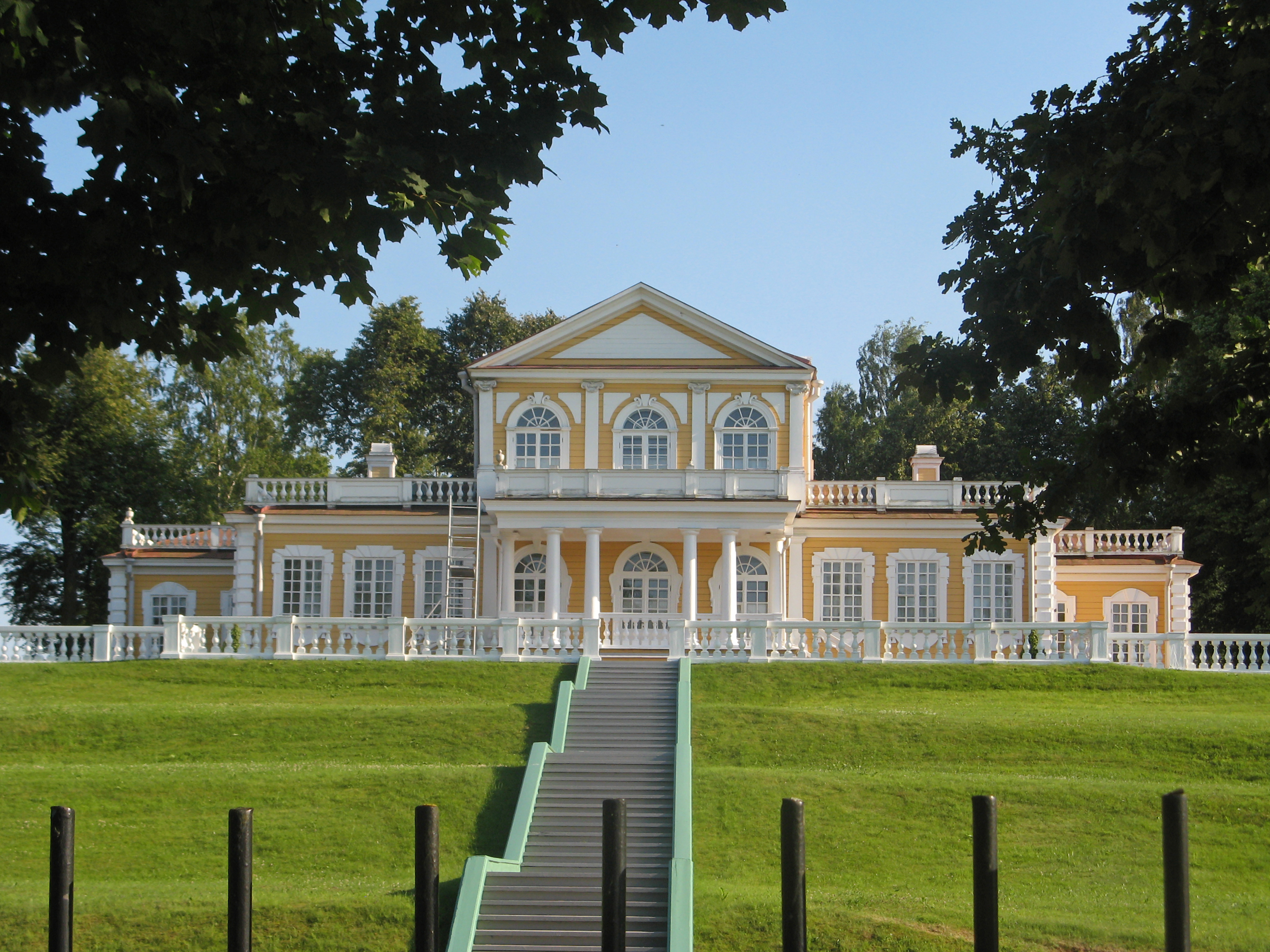
Their small wooden palace in Strelna, designed by Le Blond around 1714, had a botanical garden

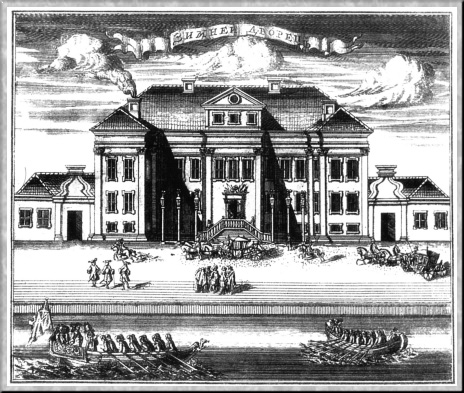
First Winter Palace by Alexey Zubov

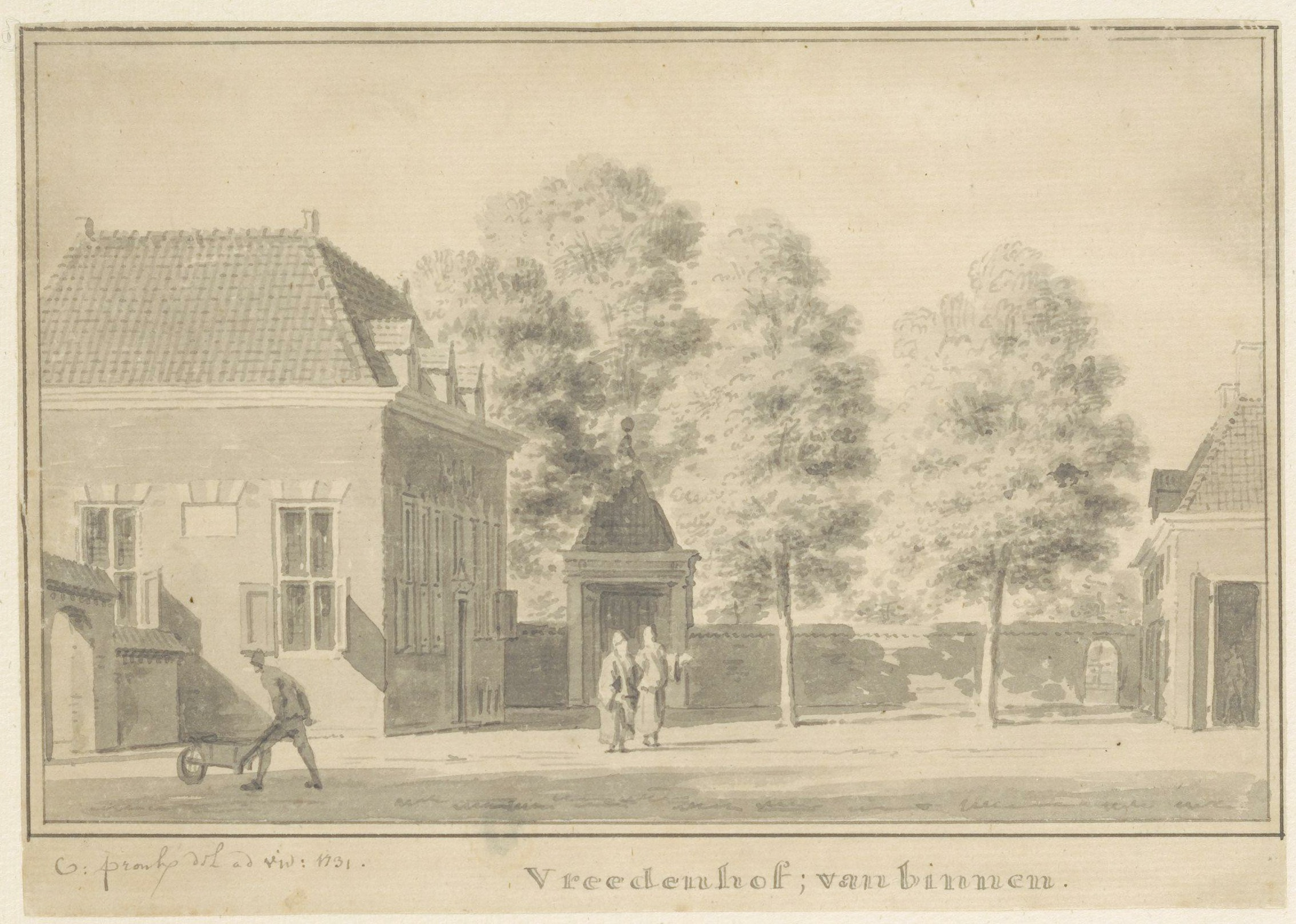
Vredenhof

Catherine and Peter held a private marriage ceremony between 23 October and 1 December 1707 in Saint Petersburg. They had twelve children, two of whom survived into adulthood, Anna (born 1708) and Elizabeth (born 1709).

Tsar Peter I had moved the capital to Saint Petersburg in 1703. While the city was being built he lived with Catherine in a modest three-room log cabin with a study but without a fire-place. The relationship was the most successful of the tsar's life and a great number of letters exist demonstrating the strong affection between Catherine and Peter I. Catherine was considered to be energetic, compassionate, charming, and always cheerful; she was able to calm the tsar in his frequent rages and was often called in to do so, as well as care for him if he suffered fits or convulsions.

Catherine went with Tsar Peter I on his Pruth Campaign in 1711. There, she was said to have saved Peter and his future empire, as related by Voltaire in his book Peter the Great. Surrounded by overwhelming numbers of Turkish troops, Catherine suggested before surrendering, that her jewels and those of the other women be used in an effort to bribe the Ottoman grand vizier Baltacı Mehmet Pasha into allowing a retreat.

Mehmet allowed the retreat, whether motivated by the bribe or considerations of trade and diplomacy. In any case, Tsar Peter I credited Catherine and proceeded to marry her again, this time officially, at Saint Isaac's Cathedral in Saint Petersburg on 9 February 1712. She was the second wife of Tsar Peter I; he had previously married and divorced Eudoxia Lopukhina, who had borne him the Tsarevich (heir apparent), Alexis Petrovich. Upon their wedding, Catherine took on the style of her husband and became Tsarina. The Order of Saint Catherine was instituted by her husband on the occasion.

Their small wooden palace in Strelna, designed around 1714, had a botanical garden. In 1716, she accompanied him to his second embassy to the United Provinces but stayed behind at Wesel to give birth. He did not take her to Paris; she stayed in Haarlemmerhout in the mansion of the Russian resident Osip Solovjov. In 1724, Peter had Catherine crowned as Empress, although he remained Russia's actual ruler.

== Empress Regnant ==
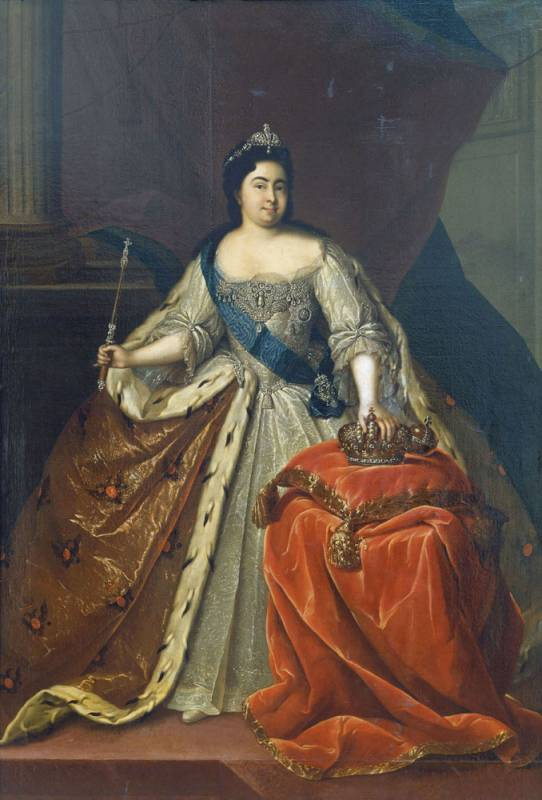
Catherine I as empress

Catherine was crowned in 1724. The year before his death, Emperor Peter the Great and Empress Catherine had an estrangement over her support of Willem Mons, brother of Peter's former mistress Anna, and brother to one of the current ladies in waiting for Catherine, Matryona. He served as Catherine's secretary. Peter I had fought long to clear up corruption in Russia. Catherine had a great deal of influence over who could gain access to her husband. Willem Mons and his sister Matryona had begun selling their influence to those who wanted access to Catherine and, through her, to Peter. Apparently this had been overlooked by Catherine, who was fond of both. Peter found out and had Willem Mons executed and his sister Matryona exiled. He and Catherine did not speak for several months. Rumors flew that she and Mons had had an affair, but there is no evidence for this.

Emperor Peter the Great died (28 January 1725 Old Style) without naming a successor. Catherine represented the interests of the "new men", commoners who had been brought to positions of great power by Peter based on competence. A change of government was likely to favor the entrenched aristocrats. For that reason during a meeting of a council to decide on a successor, a coup was arranged by Menshikov and others in which the guards regiments, with whom Catherine was very popular, proclaimed her the ruler of Russia. Supporting evidence was "produced" from Peter's secretary Makarov and the Bishop of Pskov, both "new men" with motivation to see Catherine take over. The real power, however, lay with Menshikov, Peter Tolstoy, and other members of the Supreme Privy Council.

Catherine viewed the deposed empress Eudoxia Lopukhina as a threat, so she secretly moved her to Shlisselburg Fortress near Saint Petersburg to be put in a secret prison under strict custody as a state prisoner.

== Death ==
In January 1727, she caught a chill then fever after attending a blessing of the ice ceremony on the river Neva. She never recovered, staying in bed and experiencing bleeding. Catherine I died two years after Peter I, on 17 May 1727 at age 43, in Saint Petersburg, where she was buried at St. Peter and St. Paul Fortress. Tuberculosis, diagnosed as an abscess of the lungs, was stated to have caused her early demise.

Before her death she recognized Peter II, the grandson of Peter I and Eudoxia, as her successor.

== Assessment and legacy ==
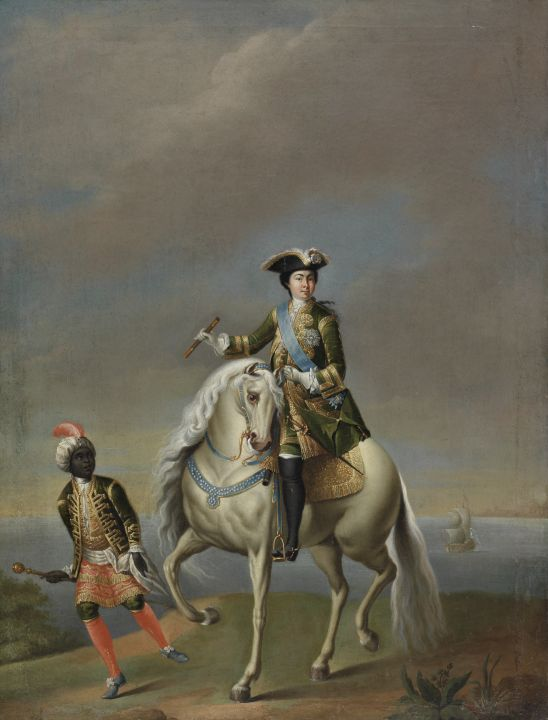
Catherine riding a horse

Catherine was the first woman to rule Imperial Russia, opening the legal path for a century almost entirely dominated by women, including her daughter Elizabeth and granddaughter-in-law Catherine the Great, all of whom continued Peter the Great's policies in modernizing Russia. At the time of Peter's death the Russian Army, composed of 130,000 men and supplemented by another 100,000 Cossacks, was easily the largest in Europe. However, the expense of the military was proving ruinous to the Russian economy, consuming some 65% of the government's annual revenue. Since the nation was at peace, Catherine was determined to reduce military expenditure. For most of her reign, Catherine I was controlled by her advisers. However, on this single issue, the reduction of military expenses, Catherine was able to have her way. The resulting tax relief on the peasantry led to the reputation of Catherine I as a just and fair ruler.

The Supreme Privy Council concentrated power in the hands of one party, and thus was an executive innovation. In foreign affairs, Russia reluctantly joined the Austro-Spanish league to defend the interests of Catherine's son-in-law, the Duke of Holstein, against Great Britain.

Catherine gave her name to Catherinehof near Saint Petersburg, and built the first bridges in the new capital. She was also the first royal owner of the Tsarskoye Selo estate, where the Catherine Palace still bears her name.

The city of Yekaterinburg is named after her, Yekaterina being the Russian form of her name.

She also gave her name to Kadriorg Palace (German: Katharinental, meaning "Catherine's Valley"), its adjacent Kadriorg Park and the later Kadriorg neighbourhood in Tallinn, Estonia.

In general, Catherine's policies were reasonable and cautious. The story of her humble origins was considered by later generations of tsars to be a state secret.

== Issue ==
Catherine and Peter had twelve children, all of whom died in childhood except Anna and Elizabeth:

- Peter Petrovich (late 1704 (Note: Between September and December)–1707), died in infancy
- Paul Petrovich (October 1705 – 1707), died in infancy
- Catherine Petrovna (7 February 1707 – 7 August 1708)
- Grand Duchess Anna Petrovna (27 January 1708 – 15 May 1728), mother of the Tzar Peter III
- Elizabeth I (29 December 1709 – 5 January 1762), Empress of Russia
- Grand Duchess Mary Natalia Petrovna (20 March 1713 – 17 May 1715)
- Grand Duchess Margaret Petrovna (19 September 1714 – 7 June 1715)
- Grand Duke Peter Petrovich (9 November 1715 – 6 May 1719)
- Grand Duke Paul Petrovich (13 January 1717 – 14 January 1717 in Wesel)
- Grand Duchess Natalia Petrovna (31 August 1718 – 15 March 1725)
- Grand Duke Peter Petrovich (7 October 1723 – 7 October 1723)
- Grand Duke Paul Petrovich (1724–1724)

== Siblings ==
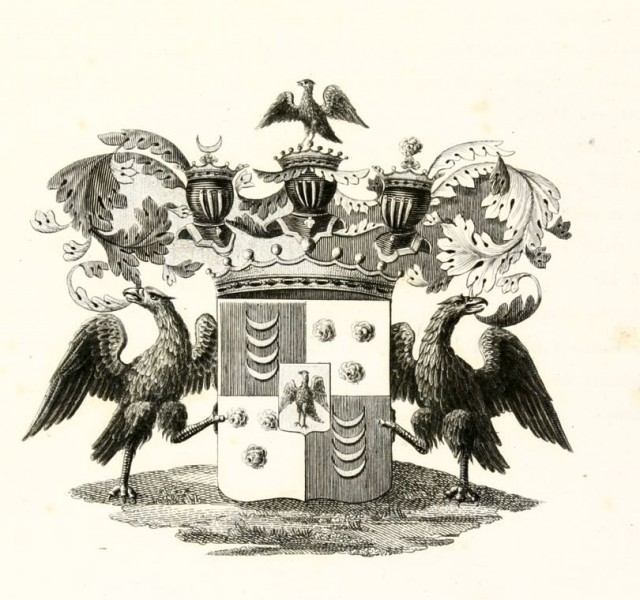
Coat of arms of the Counts Skavronsky, who became part of the Russian nobility, granted to them on 5 January 1727

Upon Peter's death, Catherine found her four siblings, Krystyna, Anna, Karol, and Fryderyk, granted them the newly created titles of Count and Countess, and brought them to Russia.

- Krystyna Dorothea Skowrońska, westernized Christina (Russian: Христина) Samuilovna Skavronskaya (1687–14 April 1729), had married Simon Heinrich (Russian: Симон Гейнрих) (1672–1728) and their descendants became Counts Gendrikov.
- Anna Skowrońska, renamed Anna Samuilovna Skavronskaya (1683-1750), had married one Michael-Joachim N and their descendants became the Counts Efimovsky.
- Karol Skowroński, renamed Karel Samuilovich Skavronsky (c.1675-1729), was created a Count Skavronsky in the Russian Empire on 5 January 1727 and made a Chamberlain of the Imperial Court; he had married Maria Ivanovna Skavronskaya, a Russian woman, by whom he had descendants who became extinct in the male line with the death of Count Pavel Martinovich Skavronsky (1757–1793), father of Princess Catherine Bagration.
- Fryderyk Skowroński, renamed Feodor Samuilovich Skavronsky (1680-1729), was created a Count Skavronsky in the Russian Empire on 5 January 1727 and was married twice: to N, a Lithuanian woman, and to Ekaterina Rodionovna Saburova, without having children by either of them.

== In popular culture ==
Catherine I is the main character of the novel 'Tsarina' by Ellen Alpsten (https://umsu.unimelb.edu.au/news/article/7797/2021-05-17-review-tsarina-a-dazzling-glimpse-into-the-mad-world-of-russian-autocracy/)

== See also ==
- Bibliography of Russian history (1613–1917)
- Rulers of Russia family tree

== Bibliography ==
- Anisimov, Evgenii V. (2004). Five Empresses: Court Life in Eighteenth-Century Russia. Westport, Connecticut: Praeger Publishers. ISBN 0275984648. OCLC 1193945667 – via the Internet Archive.
- Bain, Robert Nisbet (1911). "Catherine I." . Encyclopædia Britannica. Vol. 5 (11th ed.). pp. 525–526.
- Hughes, Lindsey (2004). "Catherine I of Russia, Consort to Peter the Great". In Campbell Orr, Clarissa (ed.). Queenship in Europe 1660–1815: The Role of the Consort. Cambridge University Press. pp. 131–154. ISBN 0-521-81422-7.
- Lincoln, W. Bruce (1981). The Romanovs. New York: Dial Press. ISBN 9780385271875.
- Massie, Robert K. (12 May 2022). Peter the Great. Apollo. ISBN 978-1-80110-277-3.

Catherine I of Russia Born: 15 April 1684 Died: 17 May 1727
Regnal titles
Preceded by Peter I	Empress of Russia; 8 February 1725 – 17 May 1727	Succeeded by Peter II
Russian royalty
Preceded by Eudoxia Lopukhina	Tsaritsa consort of Russia; 9 February 1712 – 2 November 1721	Became empress consort
New title	Empress consort of Russia; 2 November 1721 – 8 February 1725	Vacant Title next held by Yekaterina Alexeievna (Sophie of Anhalt-Zerbst)
