= Khodynka: An Incident of the Coronation of Nicholas II =

Short story by Leo Tolstoy

"Khodynka: An Incident of the Coronation of Nicholas II" ("Ходынка") is an unfinished short story by Leo Tolstoy written in 1898. It is about the Khodynka Tragedy, where 1,300 people were crushed to death in a stampede at the coronation of Nicholas II in 1896. It is loosely based on the story Khodynka: The story of one not trampled to death by V.F. Krasnov. According to award-winning biographer Alexandra Popoff, Leo Tolstoy frequently talked with his wife, Sophia Tolstoy, about the tragedy and how it weighed on his heart. According to Ronald Hingley, it was only published posthumously in 1912.

The story focuses on the protagonist, Emelian, who arrives at the coronation to feast, but soon finds that he must flee the disaster.

Nina Kosterina has compared in her Diary the work to Gorky's The Life of Klim Samgin.

== See also ==
- Bibliography of Leo Tolstoy
