= Canonization of the Romanovs =

Elevation to sainthood of the Russian imperial family

Tsar Nicholas II of Russia and Family
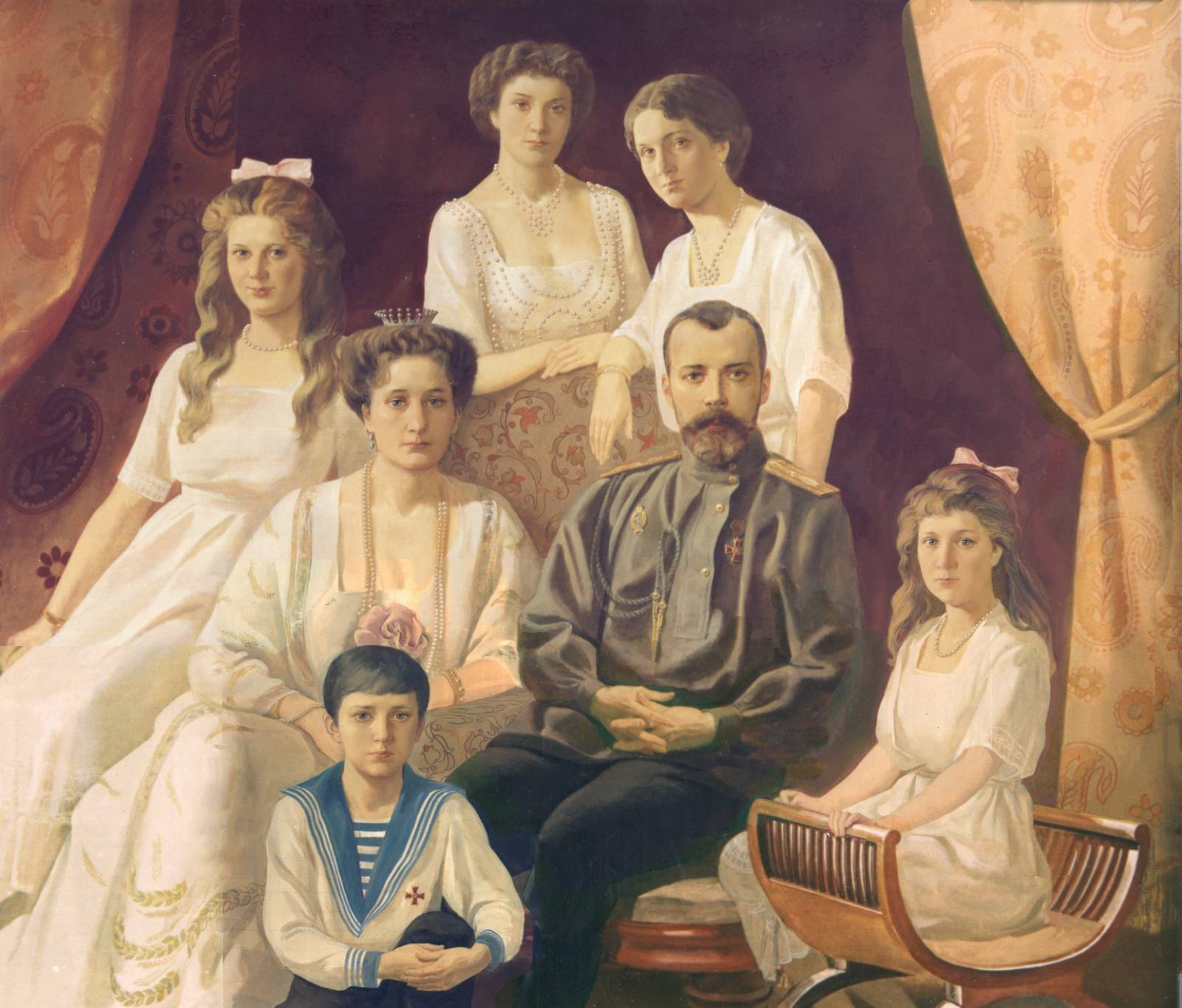
- The Romanov family.

Royal Passion-Bearers, Tsar Nicholas II of Russia and Family (Moscow Patriarchate) Royal Martyrs, Tsar Nicholas II of Russia and Family (ROCOR)
- Born: 18 May [O.S. 6 May] 1868 (Nicholas II); 6 June [O.S. 25 May] 1872 (Alexandra); 15 November [O.S. 3 November] 1895 (Olga); 10 June [O.S. 29 May] 1897 (Tatiana); 26 June [O.S. 14 June] 1899 (Maria); 18 June [O.S. 5 June] 1901 (Anastasia); 12 August [O.S. 30 July] 1904 (Alexei); Alexander Palace, Tsarkoye Selo (Nicholas and Olga); Peterhof, Russia; New Palace, Darmstadt, Hesse, German Empire (Tsarina Alexandra)
- Died: 17 July 1918; Yekaterinburg, Russian Soviet Federative Socialist Republic
- Venerated in: Eastern Orthodox Church
- Canonized: 1981 (ROCOR) and 2000 (Moscow Patriarchate), United States and Russia by Russian Orthodox Church Abroad and the Moscow Patriarchate
- Major shrine: Church on Blood, Yekaterinburg, Russia
- Feast: 17 July [O.S. 4 July]

The canonization of the Romanovs (also called "glorification" in the Eastern Orthodox Church) was the elevation to sainthood of the last imperial family of Russia—Tsar Nicholas II, his wife Tsarina Alexandra, and their five children Olga, Tatiana, Maria, Anastasia, and Alexei—by the Russian Orthodox Church.

The family was murdered by the Bolsheviks on 17 July 1918 at the Ipatiev House in Yekaterinburg. The house was later demolished. The Church on Blood was built on this site, and the altar stands over the execution site.

== Canonization ==
On 1 November 1981, Grand Duke Michael Alexandrovich of Russia (the younger brother of Nicholas II) and his secretary, Nicholas Johnson, were canonized by the Russian Orthodox Church Outside of Russia. The two men were both murdered at Perm on 13 June 1918.

On 15 August 2000, the Russian Orthodox Church announced the canonization of Nicholas II and his immediate family for their "'humbleness, patience and meekness'" during their imprisonment and execution by the Bolsheviks.

On 3 February 2016, the Bishops' Council of the Russian Orthodox Church canonized Nicholas II's personal physician, Eugene Botkin, as a righteous passion bearer.

== Controversy ==
The canonizations were controversial for both branches of the Russian Orthodox Church. In 1981, opponents noted Nicholas II's perceived weaknesses as a ruler and said that his actions had led to the Bolshevik Revolution, which caused significant damage to Russia and its people. One priest of the Russian Orthodox Church Abroad noted that martyrdom in the Russian Orthodox Church has nothing to do with the martyr's personal actions but was instead related to why he or she was killed. Other critics noted that the Russian Orthodox Church Abroad appeared to be blaming Jewish revolutionaries for the deaths and equating the political assassination with a ritual murder.

Others rejected the family's being classified as new martyrs because they were not killed because of their religious faith. Russia's Federal Investigative Committee, prompted by the Russian Orthodox Church, opened a new investigation in 2017 into whether the Romanov deaths were ritual killings, a claim that is rejected by mainstream historians who associate them with Antisemitism. The claims might arise from the fact that Yakov Yurovsky, the Red Army executioner, was Jewish. Religious leaders in both churches also had objections to canonizing the Tsar's family because they perceived him to have been a weak emperor whose incompetence led to the revolution, and the suffering of his people. They said he was at least partially responsible for his own murder and the murders of his wife and children. For these opponents, the fact that the Tsar was said to be, in private life, a kind man and a good husband and father did not override his poor governance of Russia.

Despite their official designation as "passion-bearers" by the August 2000 Council, the family are referred to as "martyrs" in Church publications, icons, and in popular veneration by the people.

Some members of the Russian Orthodox Church Abroad question the authenticity of the remains of the imperial family and believe they were faked. Zealous members of a fringe movement, known as “Tsar-worshippers”, consider Nicholas II the “Tsar-Redeemer” and believe that Russians must atone for the murders of the family, which will lead to the rebirth of the nation.

Since the late 20th century, believers have attributed healing from illnesses or conversion to the Orthodox Church to their prayers to Maria and Alexei, as well as to the rest of the family.

== Gallery ==
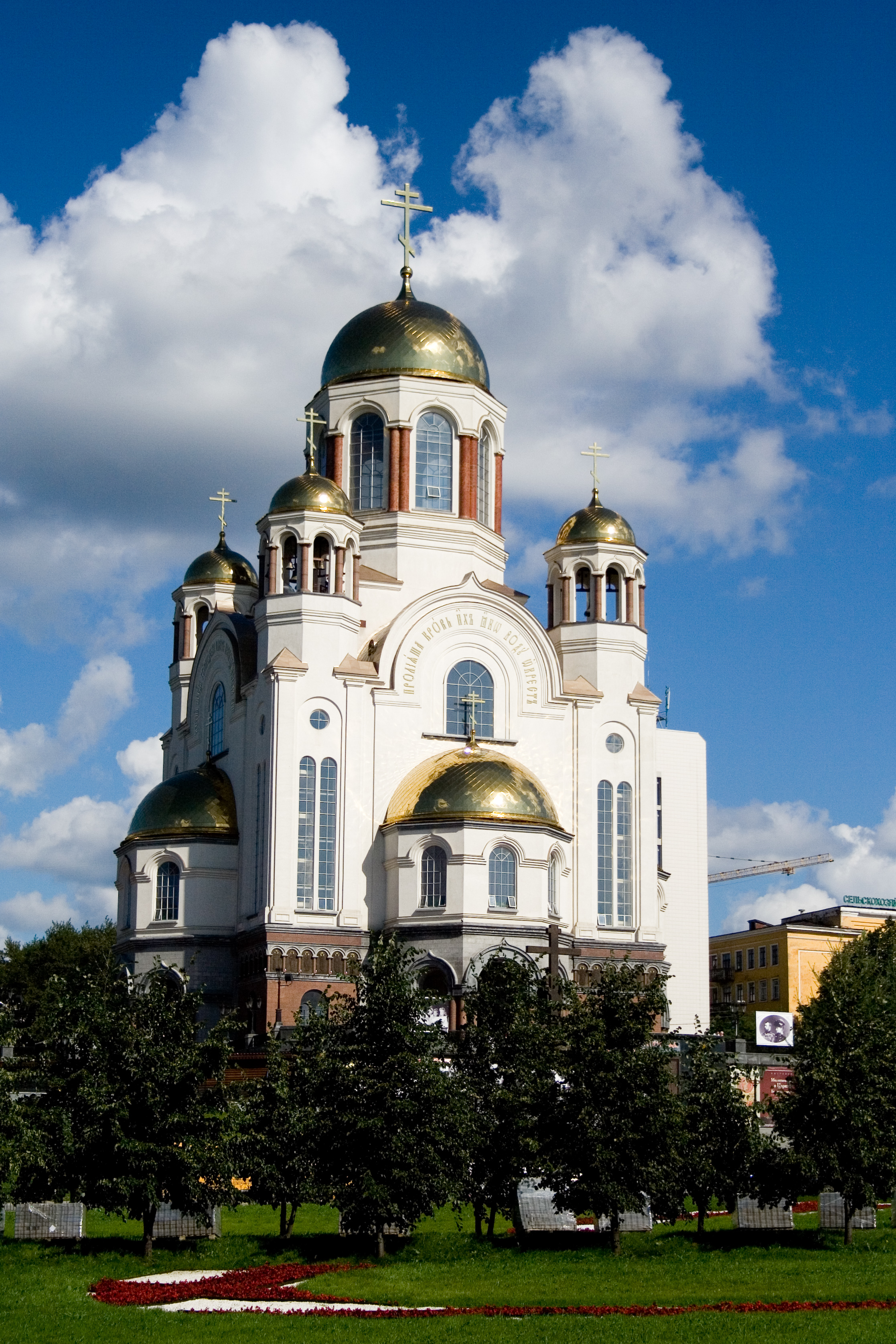
Yekaterinburg's "Church on the Blood", built on the spot where Nicholas II and his family were murdered in 1918

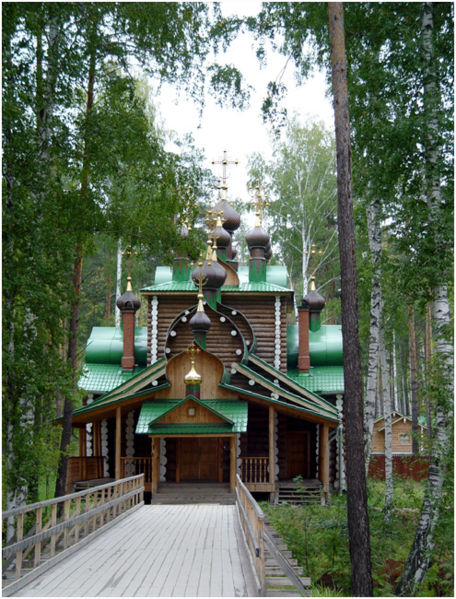
Church of St. Nicholas at the Romanov Monastery near the site where the Romanovs' remains were found at Ganina Yama

== See also ==
- Martyrs of Alapayevsk
- Tsarebozhiye
