= Rizalista religious movements =

Filipino new religious movement centering on José Rizal

Rizalistas
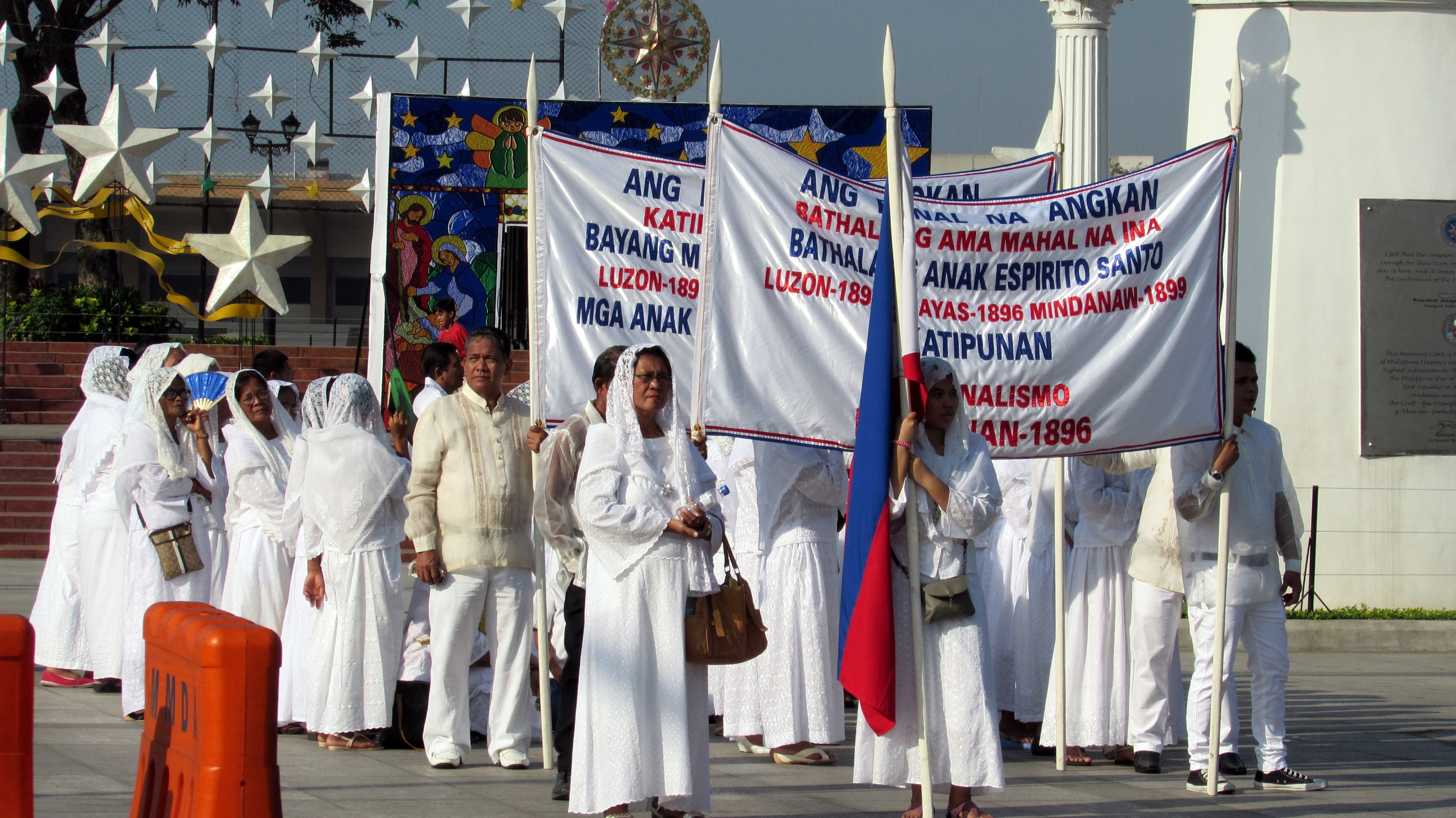
- Members of a Rizalista group during the 2015 Rizal Day celebrations at Rizal Park, Manila.

Regions with significant populations
- Philippines

Languages
- Tagalog/Filipino

The Rizalista religious movements refers to the new religious movement and a form of Folk Catholicism adopted by a number of ethnic religious groups in the Philippines that believe in the divinity of Jose Rizal, the Philippines' de facto national hero. Many of these sects or religious movements believe that Rizal is still alive and that he will deliver his followers from oppression and poverty. Rizalist groups have differing views on the divinity of Jose Rizal. Some believe that he is God himself, some believe that Rizal was the second son of God, the reincarnation of Christ. Some of these groups also identify Rizal as the god of the pre-Spanish Malay religion. Some only see as Rizal as a spiritual guide. Leaders of the sect often claim that key people in the Philippine Revolution including Rizal himself were reincarnations of the Virgin Mary. Many of these groups claim that the only key to salvation is by joining their group.

The Rizalist religious movement ranged from colorums which were prevalent during the 1920s up to the 1930s to Philippine Benevolent Missionaries Association, which was led by Ruben Ecleo. Among these movements are the Iglesia Sagarada Familia (lit. 'Church of the Holy Family'), Lipi ni Rizal (lit. 'Clan of Rizal'), Pilipinas Watawat (lit. 'Philippine Flag'), the Molo, Samahan ng Tatlong Persona Solo Dios, and the Iglesia ng Watawat ng Lahi (lit. 'Church of the Race's Flag').

Some of these groups regularly participate in Rizal Day celebrations in Rizal Park as an act of devotion to Rizal.

== See also ==
- Religious views of José Rizal
- Tsarebozhiye
