= Monarchism in Russia =

Monarchism in Russia advocates for the hypothetical restoration of the Russian monarchy, which has been non-existent since the abdication of Nicholas II on 15 March 1917 and the murder of him and the rest of his closest family in 1918, is reinstated in today's Russian Federation. The only political party which today advocates such a restoration is the Monarchist Party.

Most proposals for the restoration of the monarchy envision the return to be to a constitutional role.

== Public opinion ==
A study conducted by the All-Russian Center for Public Opinion showed that almost one third of the Russian population favor a restoration as of 2013.

In 2017, a survey conducted by Izvestia found that 37 percent of all Russians were "not against the monarchy, but ... did not see a candidate for such a post". The survey also found that 46 percent of young Russians were not opposed to the restoration of the monarchy.

== Political opinion ==
The restoration has been proposed by, among others, Vladimir Petrov, a politician of the ruling United Russia and affiliate of President Vladimir Putin. Vladimir Zhirinovsky, prominent politician and leader of LDPR, was also known to express such ideas.

== Possible lines of succession ==
=== Direct male line (male primogeniture) ===
The direct male line of succession (based on descent from Emperor Nicholas I of Russia) to Prince Alexis Romanov, currently the senior agnatic heir to the House of Romanov, is:

- Emperor Nicholas I (1796–1855)
  - Grand Duke Michael Nikolaevich of Russia (1832–1909)
    - Grand Duke Alexander Mikhailovich of Russia (1866–1933)
      - Prince Andrei Alexandrovich of Russia (1897–1981)
        - Prince Andrew Andreevich (1923–2021)
          - Prince Alexis Andreevich (b. 1953)
          - (1) Prince Peter Andreevich (b. 1961)
          - (2) Prince Andrew Andreevich (b. 1963)
      - Prince Rostislav Alexandrovich of Russia (1902–1978)
        - Prince Rostislav Rostislavovich (1938–1999)
          - (3) Prince Rostislav Rostislavovich (b. 1985)
            - (4) Prince Rostislav Rostislavovich (b. 2013)
          - (5) Prince Nikita Rostislavovich (b. 1987)
        - Prince Nicholas Rostislavovich (1945–2000)
          - (6) Prince Nicholas Christopher Nikolaievich (b. 1968)
          - (7) Prince Daniel Joseph Nikolaievich (b. 1972)
            - (8) Prince Jackson Daniel Danilovich (b. 2009)

=== Line of Maria Vladimirovna ===
If one accepts that Vladimir Kirillovich's marriage to Leonida Bagration of Mukhrani was non-morganatic and that he was succeeded by his daughter, Maria Vladimirovna, then the line of succession is:

- Emperor Alexander II (1818–1881)
  - Grand Duke Vladimir Alexandrovich of Russia (1847–1909)
    - Kirill Vladimirovich, Grand Duke of Russia (1876–1938)
      - Grand Duke Vladimir Kirillovich of Russia (1917–1992)
        - Grand Duchess Maria Vladimirovna (b. 1953)
          - (1) Grand Duke George Mikhailovich (b. 1981) (Note: has been styled Grand Duke of Russia since birth, also a Prince of Prussia (a title which he does not generally use))
            - (2) His Serene Highness Prince Alexander Georgievich (b. 2022)

==== Note ====
In either case, at the death of the last uncontestable Head of the Imperial House of Romanov in 1992, all the other living male-line descendants and Grand-Dukes were morganatic.

== See also ==
- Operation Trust
- Tsarebozhiye
- Russian nationalism
