= Iglesia Watawat ng Lahi =

Socio-folk religious group based in Calamba, Laguna

- Abbreviation: IWLI
- Scripture: Bible, Sugong Kayumanggi, Noli Me Tangere, and El Filibusterismo
- Region: Philippines
- Headquarters: Calamba, Laguna
- Origin: December 25, 1936; 89 years ago Calamba, Laguna

The Iglesia Watawat Ng Lahi, Inc. (lit. 'Church of the Banner of the Race'; abbreviated as IWLI) is a socio-folk religious group based on Lecheria Hill in Calamba, Laguna which believes in the divinity of José Rizal, a historic figure of the Philippine Revolution. It is often considered as the original Rizalist group among the many other Rizalista religious movements.

== History ==
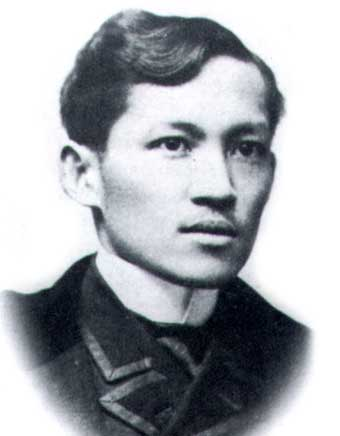
The group believes in the divinity of Jose Rizal

The Iglesia Watawat ng Lahi, often considered as the original Rizalist group, was established on December 25, 1936. Rev. Fr. Luis Fabrigar and Jose Valincunoza was the sect's first Supreme Bishop and president respectively.

The sect's headquarters is located in Calamba, Laguna and has established 100 chapters throughout the Philippines. In the 1980s, the number of Rizalista converts was about 100,000 the highest amount in sect's history but within the same period, the group experienced a schism with four new groups seceding from the Iglesia Watawat ng Lahi. The group's leaders preached that the end of the world would occur in the year 2000.

As of 2012, the sect's membership was reduced by at least 90 percent. The sect is led by Bonifacio Relleta as of the same year.

== Beliefs and practices ==
The Iglesia Watawat ng Lahi's doctrine was derived from Catholic teachings and Philippine nationalism as exemplified through the literary works of José Rizal. The organization of the group is composed of two distinct lines; an ecclesiastical group which is composed of the group's religious leaders headed by the "Supreme Bishop", who is a member of the group's Board of Directors; and a secular group which consist of the membership of the Rizalist Youth Association.

=== Divinity of Jose Rizal ===
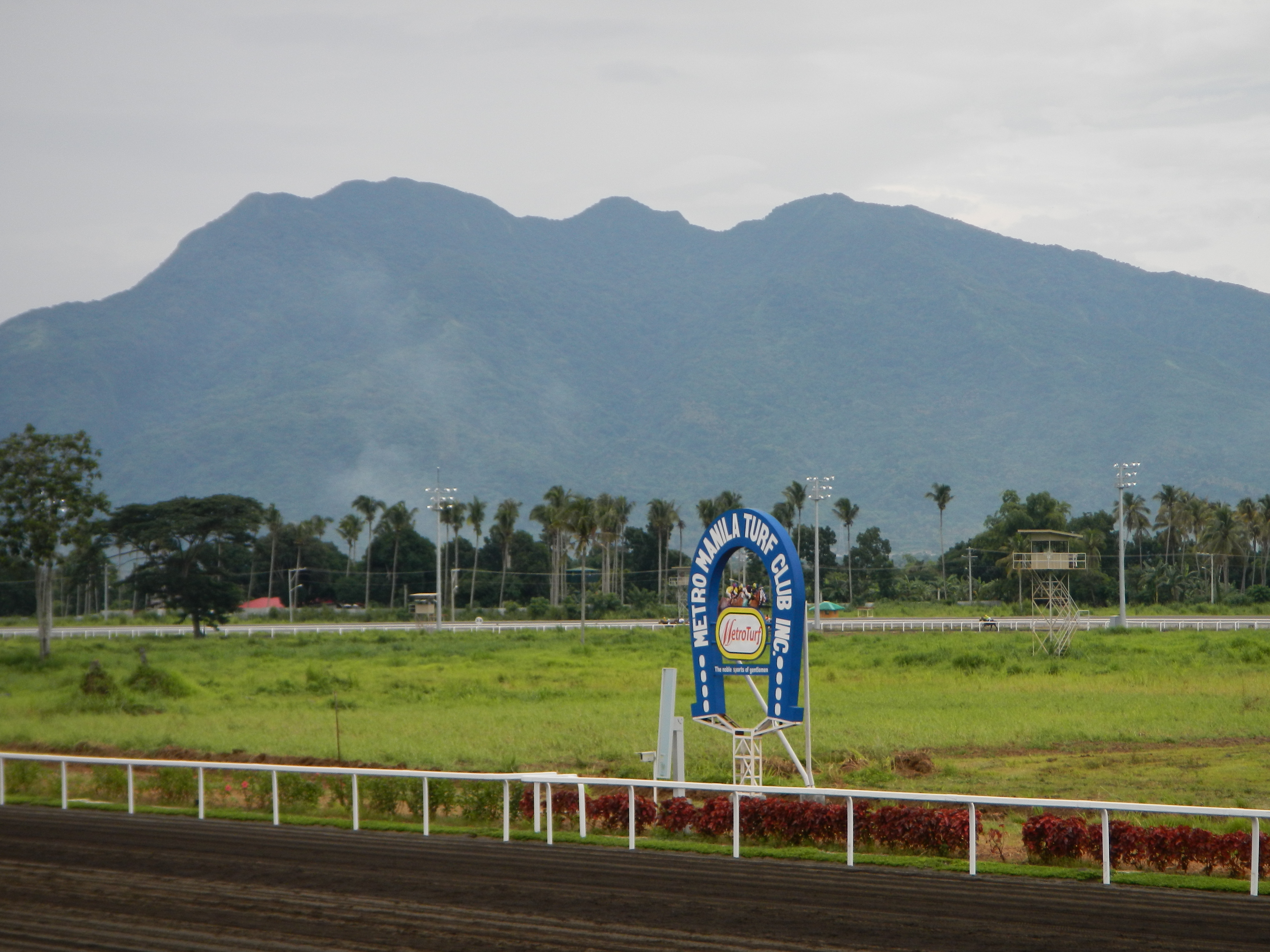
The Iglesia Watawat ng Lahi believes that Jose Rizal is still alive and living in Mount Makiling

The Iglesia Watawat ng Lahi believes that Rizal is the incarnation of Holy Spirit. They believed that Rizal was never truly killed during his execution in Bagumbayan. The point out that when Rizal's body was about to be exhumed in Paco Park, Rizal was nowhere to be found and that a tree trunk and a pair of shoes was found at the site. They believed that Rizal is still living in Mount Makiling.

The sects has its version on the account of Jose Rizal's life. Jose Rizal as a baby was found by Francisco Mercado and Teodora Alonzo, who were recorded by documented historical accounts as his biological parents. The couple wanted to baptize Rizal as Jove Rex Al, but the name was turned down due to it being close to Christ's name by the officiating Catholic priest. The baby was then baptized as Jose Rizal. The first preachers of the sect were referred to as the Banal na Tinig (lit. 'Holy Sound'). They are believed to be able to communicate with Rizal, who lived in Makiling.

The birth and death anniversary of Rizal are considered one of the most important holiday for the sect. During these days the sect celebrates Misa de Tres an elaborate celebration of flowers, flags and parades. Gomburza Day, Bonifacio Day and other national holidays are also important holidays for the sect. The sect also celebrates Christmas every October 3, the date they consider as the true birthday of Jesus Christ.

The group's members believe that Rizal will come out of hiding from Mount Makiling to liberate the Philippines in the end of the world.

=== Other customs and beliefs ===
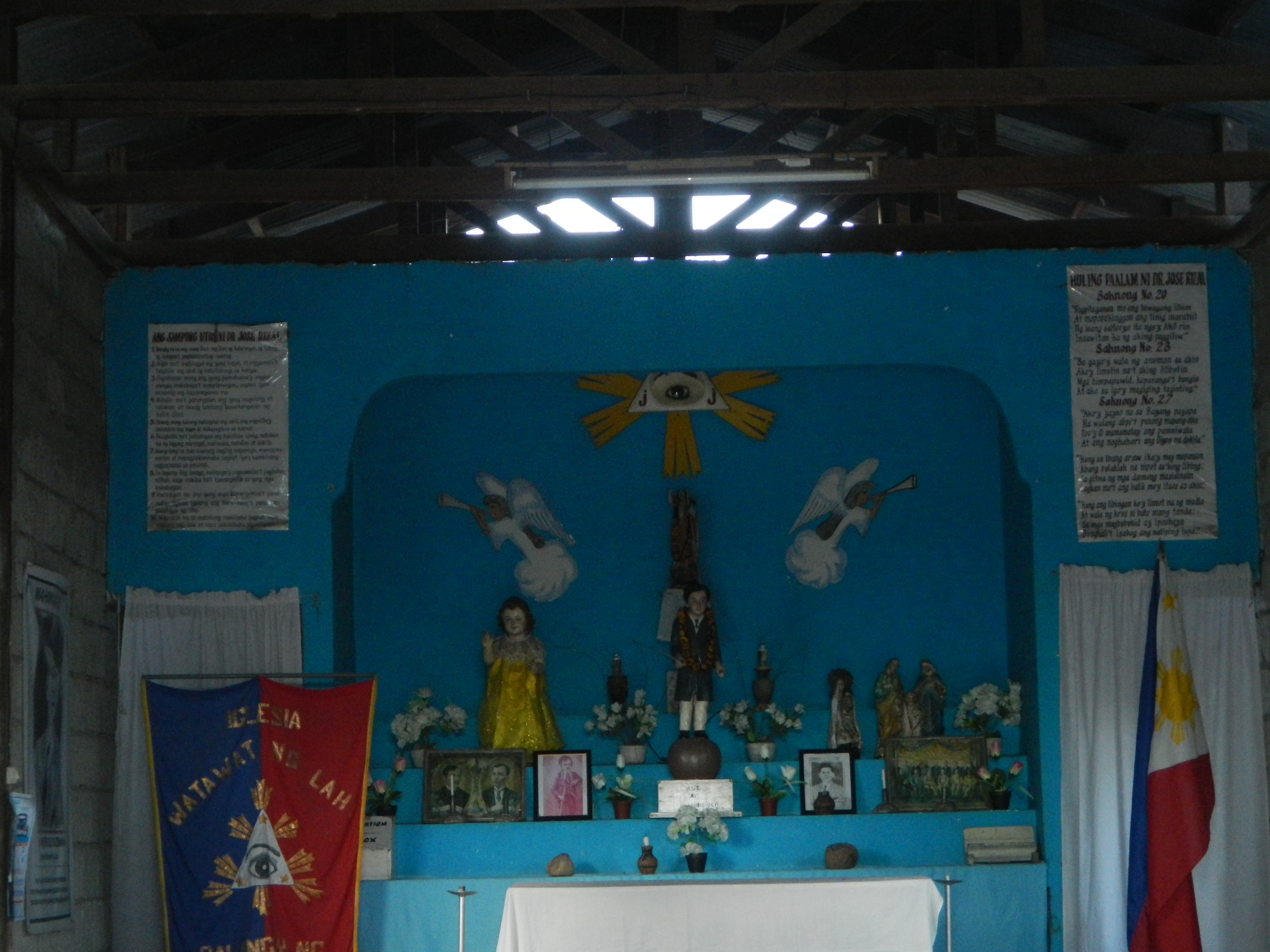
The altar of an Iglesia Watawat ng Lahi church.

The Iglesia Watawat ng Lahi requires aspiring priest to study in an institution somewhere in Bicol. Their priests are also allowed to marry after they have served the church for at least five years. Sect officials are not paid and are supported by donations by the sect's financially able members.

Alongside the Bible, they also have the Sugong Kayumanggi (lit. 'The Brown Messenger'), the second most important book for the sect. Rizal's two novels, Noli Me Tangere and El Filibusterismo is considered by some as the sect's counterpart of the Bible of the Catholics by some elders. They also have only three commandments as opposed to the ten by the Catholic Church. The Rizalistas are taught to love God, people and society. Recently love for the environment were added to their teachings.

During many religious celebrations, sect members often wear clothing with the colors of the Philippine flag.
