= Church of All Saints, Yekaterinburg =

Church of All Saints
- Church on Blood in Honour of All Saints Resplendent in the Russian Land
- Храм-на-Крови́ во и́мя Всех святы́х, в земле́ Росси́йской просия́вших
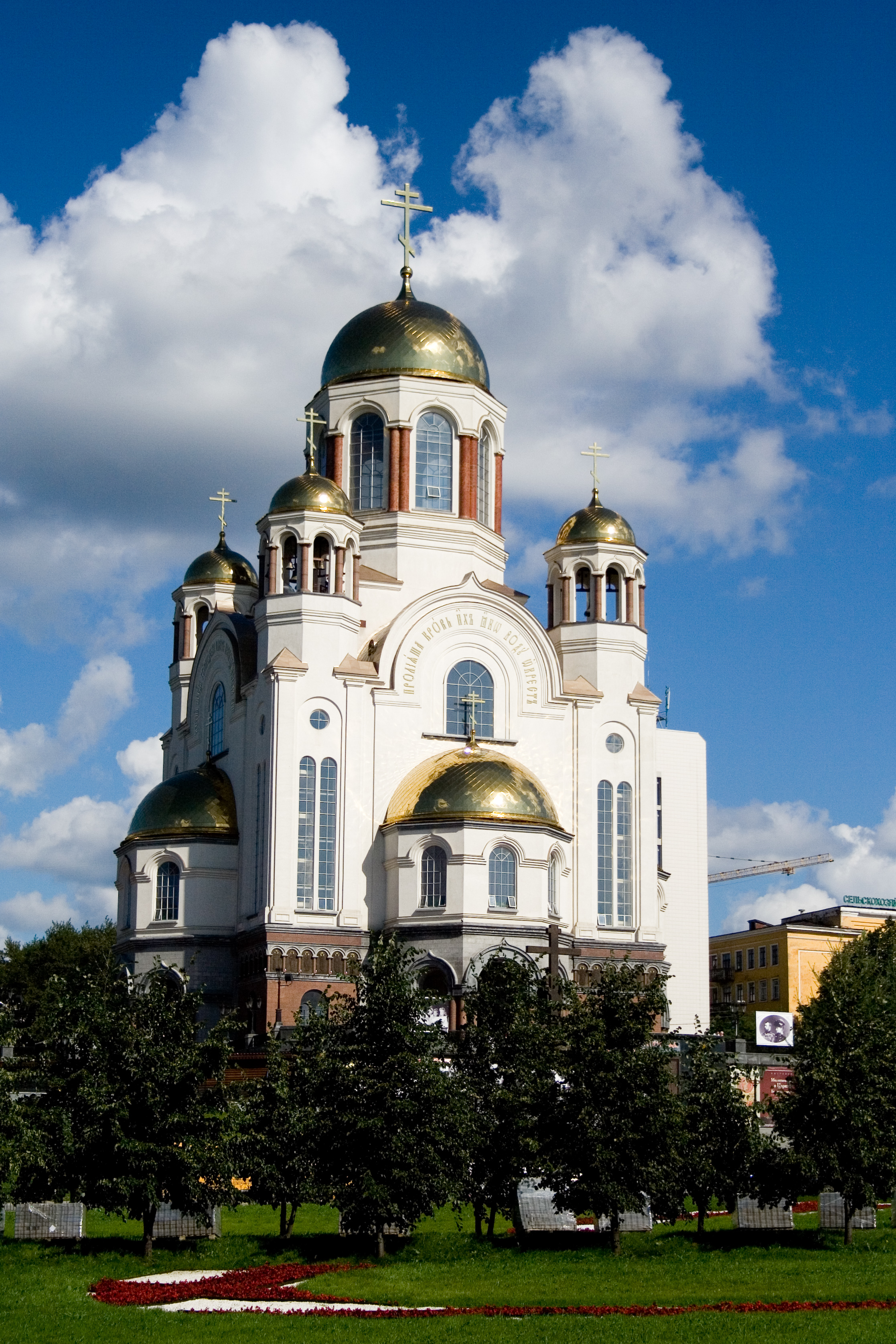
- Church of All Saints
- 56°50′40″N 60°36′35″E
- Location: Yekaterinburg
- Country: Russia
- Denomination: Russian Orthodox Church

History
- Status: Chapel

Architecture
- Functional status: Active (special occasions); Museum
- Architectural type: Church
- Style: Byzantine Revival
- Years built: 2000–2003
- Groundbreaking: 23 September 1992

Administration
- Diocese: Yekaterinburg and Verkhoturye

The Church on Blood in Honour of All Saints Resplendent in the Russian Land (Note: Russian: Храм-на-Крови́ во и́мя Всех святы́х, в земле́ Росси́йской просия́вших, romanized: Khram-na-kroví vo ímya Vsekh svyatýkh, v zemlé Rossýskoy prosiyávshikh, IPA: [xram nə krɐˈvʲi vɐ ˈimʲə fsʲex svʲɪˈtɨx v zʲɪˈmlʲe rɐˈsʲijskəj prəsʲɪˈjæfʂɨx].) is a Russian Orthodox church in Yekaterinburg. Being built on the site of the Ipatiev House where Nicholas II, the last Emperor of Russia, and his family, along with members of the household, were murdered by the Bolsheviks during the Russian Civil War, the church commemorates the Romanov sainthood.

== Site history ==
=== Ipatiev House ===
The Ipatiev House, built in the 1880s, was a spacious and modern residence owned by Nicholas Ipatiev. The Ural Soviet gave him two days' notice to leave. Once the building was vacated, the Soviets built high wooden walls around the house. First to arrive among the Romanovs were Nicholas, Alexandra Feodorovna and their daughter Maria. Later, they would be joined by Olga, Tatiana, Anastasia and Alexei. The Romanovs would be held prisoner in their final residence for 78 days. In 1974, the mansion was designated a "national monument"; but three years later on 22 September 1977, a team, under orders from the Soviet government and with the direction of Boris Yeltsin, demolished the house.

=== Romanov murder ===
After the February Revolution, the former Tsar and his family were taken captive and held as prisoners during the Russian Civil War. Tsar Nicholas and his family were at first kept at the Alexander Palace at Tsarskoe Selo outside St. Petersburg. Alexander Kerensky, leader of the provisional government moved them to the former Governor's mansion in Tobolsk. Later they were transferred to the Ipatiev House in Yekaterinburg.

With the advance of the Czechoslovak Legion (fighting with the White Army against Bolsheviks) towards Yekaterinburg, fears of a potential attempt to liberate them grew, and the local Bolshevik leaders, after consulting the leadership in Moscow, decided to kill the family. In the early hours of 17 July 1918, the Tsar Nicholas Alexandrovich, Tsarina Alexandra Feodorovna, Grand Duchess Olga, Grand Duchess Tatiana, Grand Duchess Maria, Grand Duchess Anastasia and Tsarevich Alexei were taken to the basement of the Ipatiev House and were murdered by being shot and bayoneted. Czechoslovak Legions captured the city less than a week later.

== Church history ==
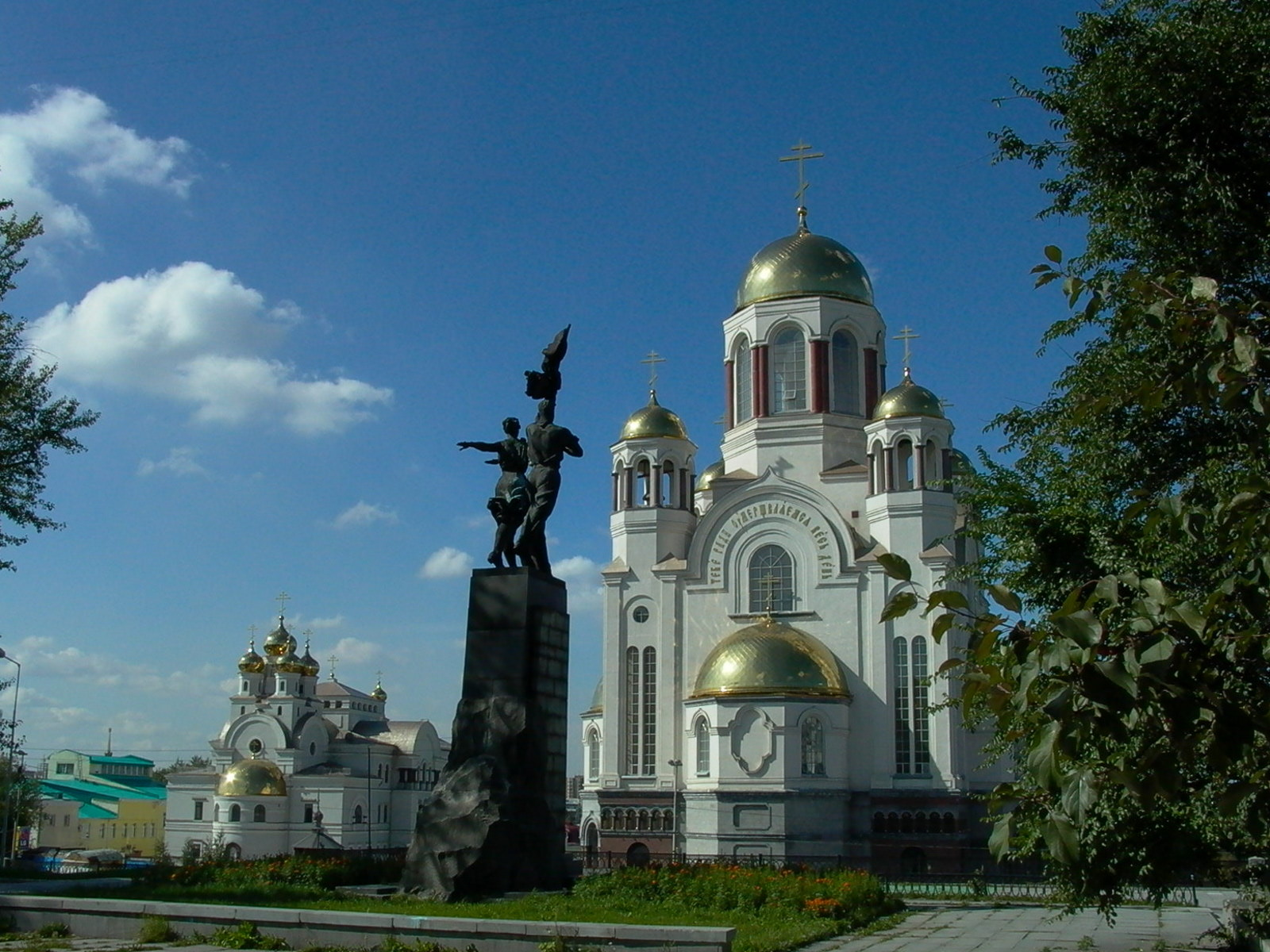
Yekaterinburg's "Church on the Blood" built on the spot where the last Tsar and his family were murdered.

On 20 September [O.S. 7 September] 1990, the Sverdlovsk Soviet handed the plot to the Russian Orthodox Church for construction of a memorial chapel. After the former Tsar and his family were canonized as "Passion Bearers", the Church planned to build an impressive memorial complex dedicated to the Romanov family. A state commission was gathered and architectural as well as funding plans were developed. Construction began in 2000.

The completed complex comprises two churches, a belfry, a patriarchal annex, and a museum dedicated to the former imperial family; the altar of the main church is directly over the site where the Romanovs were murdered. The complex covers a total of 2,760 square metres (29,700 sq ft).

On 16 July [O.S. 3 July] 2003, 85 years after the murder of the former imperial family, the main church was consecrated by Metropolitan bishop Yuvenaly, delegated by Patriarch Alexy II who was too ill at the time to travel to Yekaterinburg, assisted by Russian Orthodox clergy from all over the Russian Federation. In 2003, President Vladimir Putin and German Chancellor Gerhard Schröder met in Yekaterinburg and visited the church.

Since 2007, on Christmas Day (January 7), the international ice sculpture festival "Bethlehem Star" has been held at the Church of All Saints. In 2017, twenty teams from different cities of Russia took part in it.

== The Cross ==
On one side of the church, there is an Orthodox cross which marks the exact location of the basement of the Ipatiev house, where the Romanov Family was murdered. Even during the Soviet era, there were crosses in that area built clandestinely by local monarchists but it changed over time. Different crosses were replaced by a new one as the years went by as communist authorities removed the previous ones. A small wooden structure was eventually built behind the cross and stands near the church.

== See also ==
- Ganina Yama
