= Ganina Yama =

Pit in a Russian coal mine

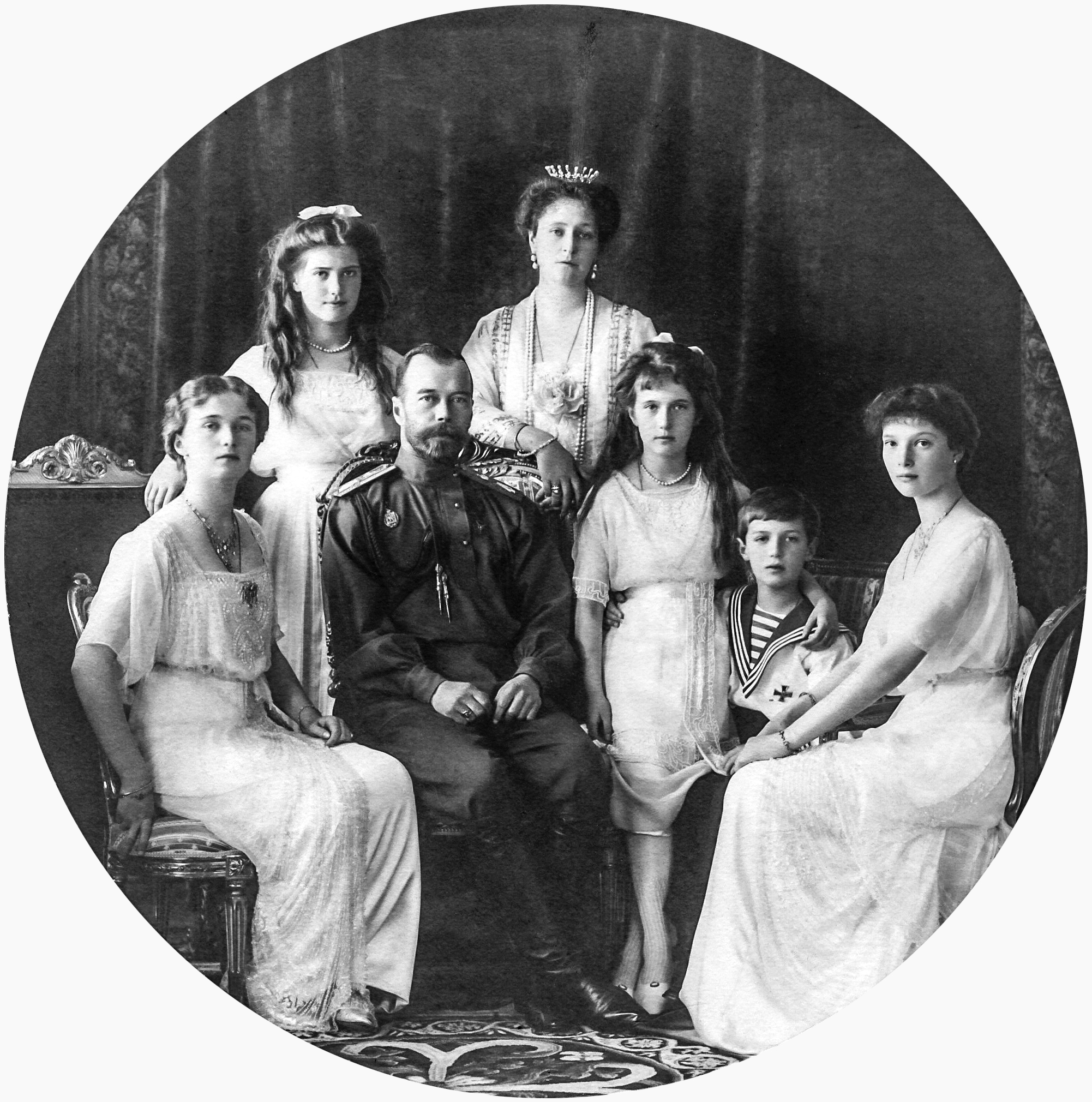
Nicholas II with his family. (left to right) Olga, Maria, Tsar Nicholas II, his wife Alexandra, Anastasia, Alexei and Tatiana.

Ganina Yama (Russian: Га́нина Я́ма, "Ganya’s Pit") was a 6 ft (2 m) deep pit in the Four Brothers mine near the village of Koptyaki, 15 km (10 miles) north from Yekaterinburg. In the pre-dawn hours of 17 July 1918, after the murder of the Romanov family, the bodies of Tsar Nicholas II of Russia and his family (who had been murdered at the Ipatiev House) were secretly transported to Ganina Yama and thrown into the pit.

A week later, the White Army drove the Bolsheviks from the area and launched an investigation into the fate of the royal family. An extensive report concluded that the royal family's remains had been cremated at the mine since evidence of fire was found and charred bones, but no bodies. But the Bolsheviks, realizing that the burial site was no longer a secret, had returned to the site the night after the first burial to relocate the bodies to another area. The secret Bolshevik report on the execution and burial did not give the location of the second burial site, but the description provided clues.

The second burial site, a field known as Porosyonkov Log (Поросёнков лог, "Piglet’s Ravine") four and a half miles from Ganina Yama (56.9113628°N 60.4954326°E), was discovered in the late 1970s through clandestine research but kept secret until the political climate changed in 1989. In 1995, the remains found at the Porosyonkov Ravine were identified as Romanovs using DNA from living relatives of Nicholas and Alexandra’s parents. The Porosyonkov Ravine burial pit is marked by a cross and simple landscaping of the burial pit. A second, smaller pit was located at the Porosenkov Ravine in 2007 containing the remains of two Romanov children missing from the larger grave. Further excavation was planned for the summer of 2009.

The Russian Orthodox Church, relying on the White Army's reports in preference to Bolshevik reports, and doubting the DNA identification, declared the Ganina Yama site holy ground. The royal family and their retinue had been canonized in 1981 by the Russian Orthodox Church Abroad. The grounds were therefore dedicated to honor the family’s humility during capture and their status as political martyrs. With financial assistance from the Ural Mining and Metallurgical Company, the Church constructed the Monastery of the Holy Imperial Passion-Bearers at the site in 28 December 2000. A tall cross marks the edge of the mine shaft, visible as a depression in the ground.

Seven chapels were later constructed at the site, one for each member of the royal family. Each chapel is dedicated to a particular saint or relic. The katholikon is dedicated to the Theotokos Derzhavnaya, an icon particularly revered by the monarchists; burnt to the ground on 14 September 2010 but has now been fully restored. On the anniversary of the murder, a night-long service is held at the Church of All Saints (Church on the Blood) on the site of the Ipatiev House. At daybreak, a procession walks four hours to Ganina Yama for another ceremony. The former mine pit is covered with lily plants for the ceremony.

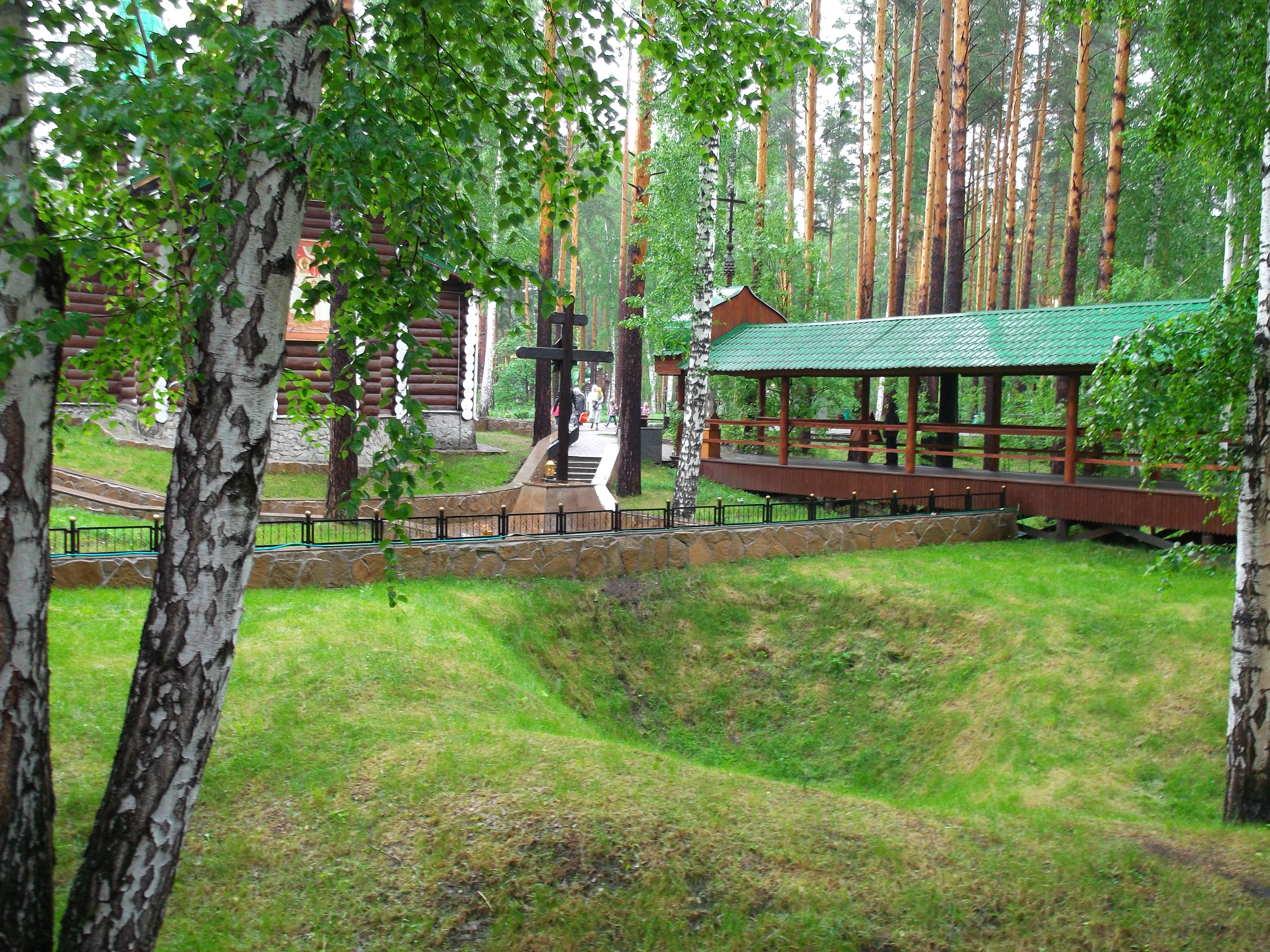

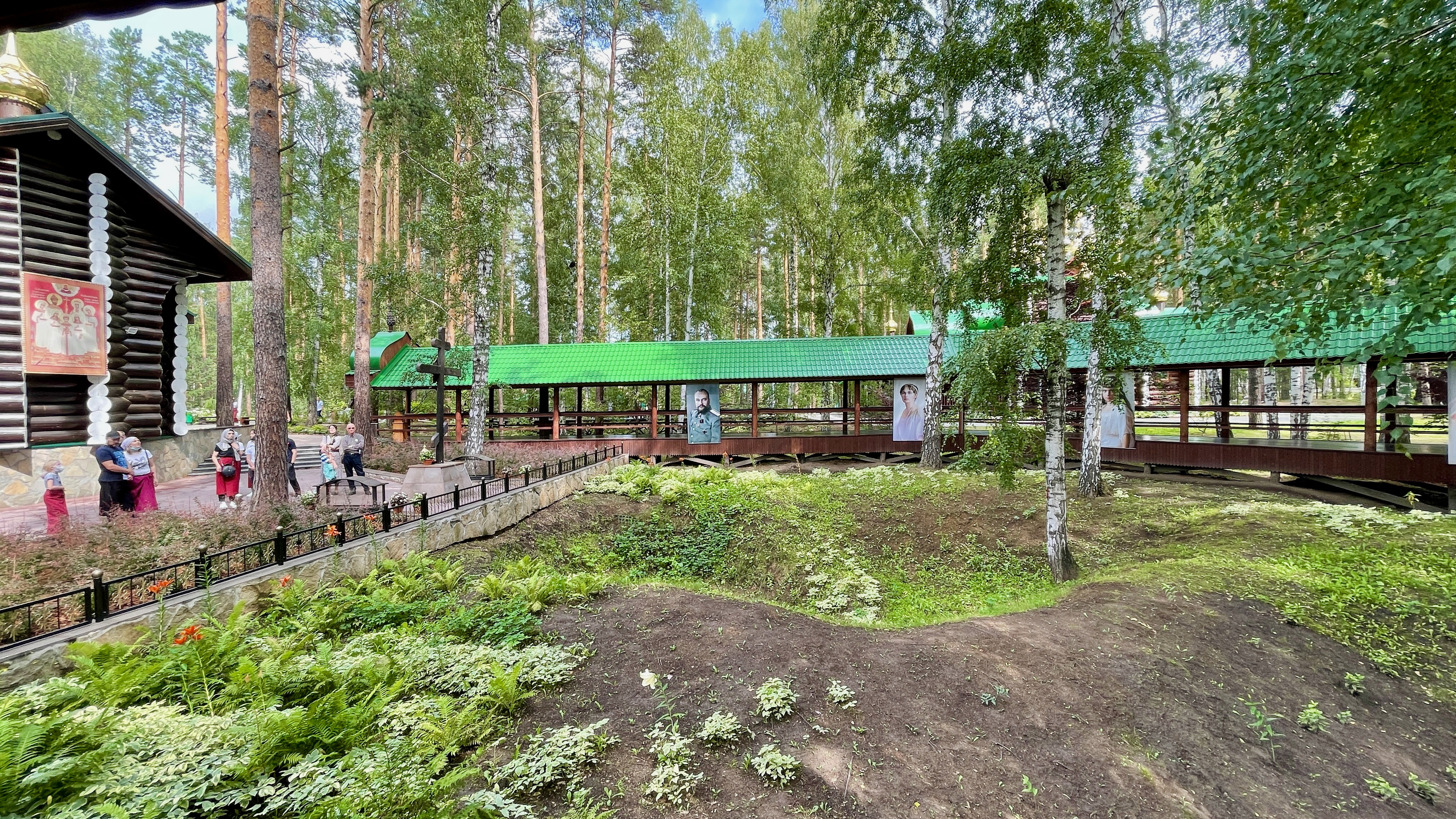

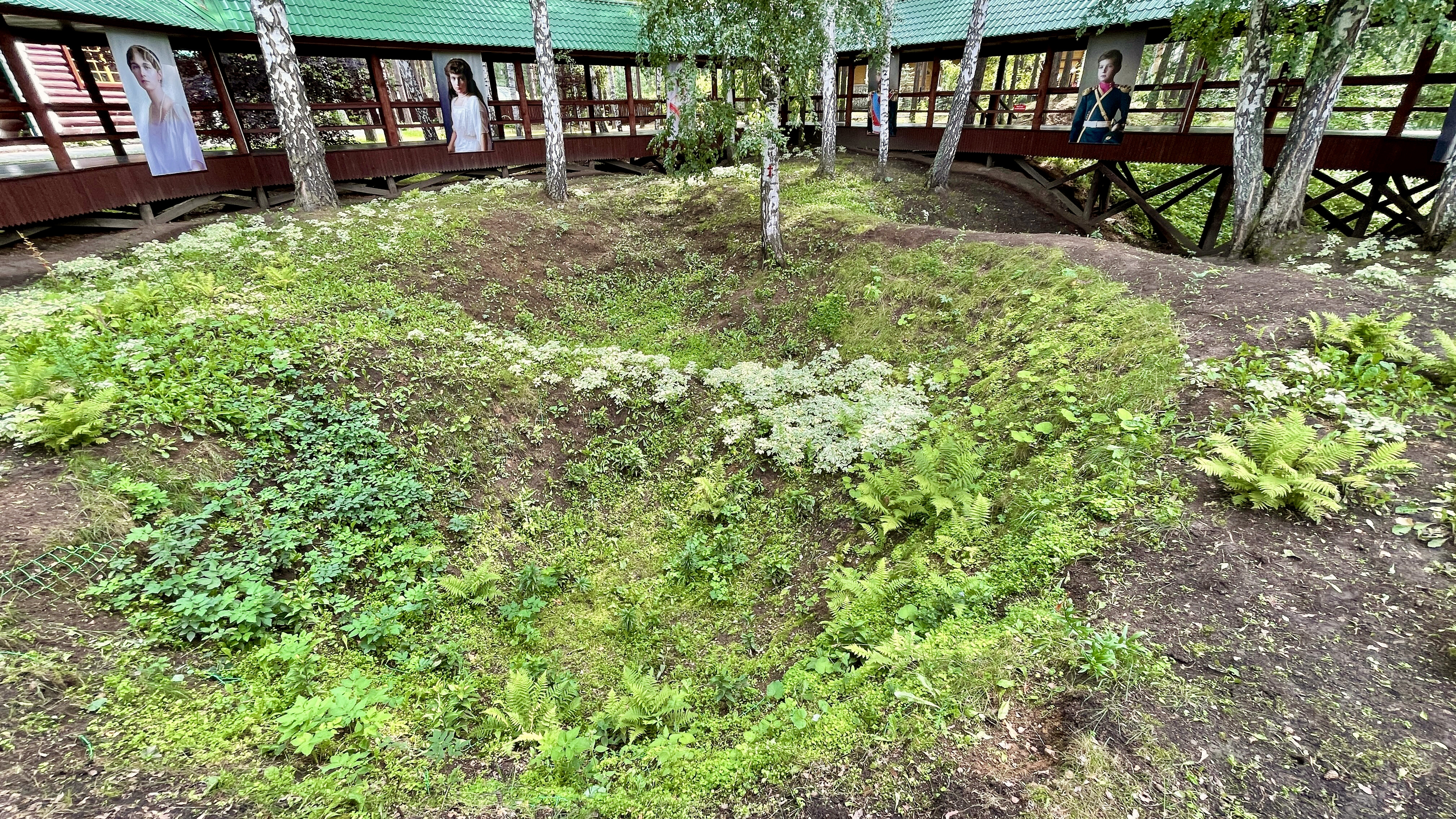

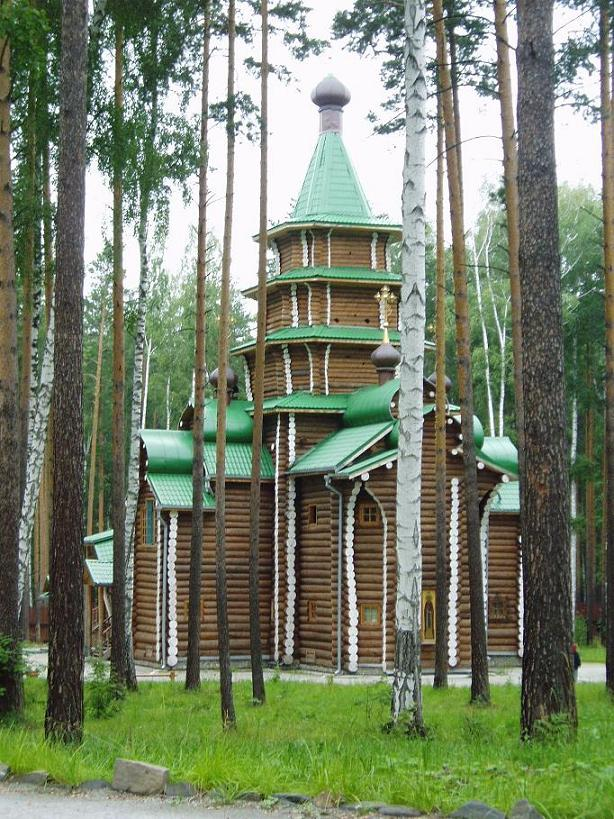

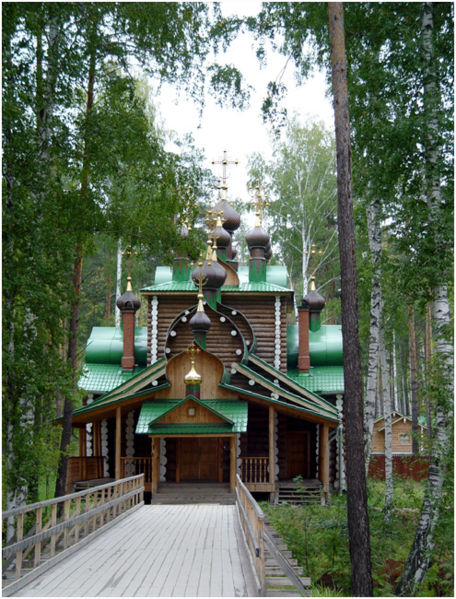

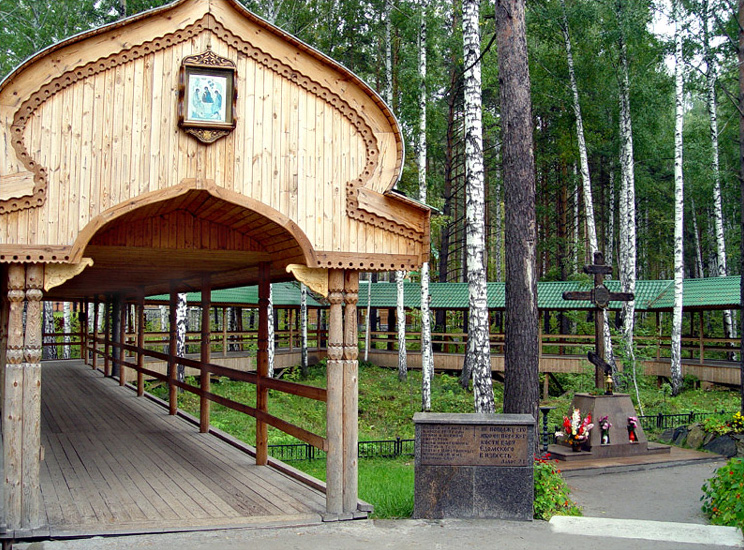
