= Martyrs of Alapayevsk =

Murdered members of the House of Romanov

Martyrs Martyrs of Alapayevsk
- Died: 18 July 1918; Saint Petersburg, Russian Empire
- Venerated in: Russian Orthodox Church Outside of Russia
- Major shrine: Elizabeth's relics in Jerusalem, others' relics in Beijing
- Feast: January 29; July 5

The Martyrs of Alapayevsk (Martyrs of the Alapayevskaya Mine) are members of the House of Romanov and people close to them who were killed by Soviet authorities on the night of July 18, 1918, the day after the murder of the Romanov family. They were killed 18 km from the town of Alapayevsk near the Nizhnyaya Selimskaya Mine, in one of the mines where their bodies were dumped. On June 8, 2009, the Russian Prosecutor General's Office posthumously exonerated all those killed near Alapayevsk.

The Russian Orthodox Church Outside of Russia canonized all those killed in Alapayevsk (except for F. Remez) as martyrs. The Russian Orthodox Church canonized only two of them as saints: Grand Duchess Elizabeth Feodorovna and Sister Barbara (as monastic martyr).

Among the victims of the Alapayevsk massacre are:

1. Grand Duchess Elizabeth Feodorovna;
2. Grand Prince (or Duke) Sergei Mikhailovich;
3. John Konstantinovich, Prince of royal blood;
4. Prince Konstantin Konstantinovich (the Younger) of royal blood;
5. Prince Igor Konstantinovich of royal blood;
6. Prince Vladimir Pavlovich Paley (son of the Grand Duke Paul Alexandrovich from his morganatic marriage to Olga Pistolkors);
7. Fyodor Semyonovich (Mikhailovich) Remez, administrator of the affairs of Grand Duke Sergei Mikhailovich;
8. Barbara (Yakovleva), a sister of the Marfo-Mariyinsky Convent, a nurse to Elizaveta Feodorovna.

On that place in 1995 a monastery was established in the name of the New Martyrs and Confessors of the Russian Church.

== Previous events ==
From their first days in power, the Bolsheviks not only continued the Provisional Government's policy of destroying the symbols of tsarist autocracy, but also began to erase any memory of the House of Romanov. By the end of February 1918, the political and economic situation in Soviet Russia had deteriorated significantly. The German offensive on the entire Eastern front of World War I began, threatening Petrograd. The radicalization of the masses, already rebellious after a year of Revolution, was intensified by the deepening devastation of the national economy. The Bolshevik leaders considered it dangerous for representatives of the Imperial House of Romanov to stay in the capital, especially under the conditions of the approaching external enemy and the danger of anti-government protests inside the country.

The historian V. M. Khrustalev believed that by this time the Bolshevik leaders had devised a plan to gather all the representatives of the Romanov dynasty in the Urals, away from external dangers —the German Empire and the Entente— while ensuring they were in a location where the Bolsheviks had a strong political position and could maintain control over the situation with the Romanovs. As Khrustalev wrote, the Romanovs could only be destroyed if a suitable opportunity arose. On March 9, 1918, Grand Duke Mikhail Alexandrovich was exiled from Petrograd to Perm by order of the Soviet government. Following Mikhail, on March 26, 1918 from Petrograd to Vyatka were exiled Grand Duke Sergei Mikhailovich, three brothers John, Konstantin and Igor Konstantinovich (children of Grand Duke Konstantin Konstantinovich) and Vladimir Pavlovich, and a month later transferred to the "red capital of the Urals" — Ekaterinburg. In early April 1918, commissar Yakovlev left Moscow for Tobolsk, where the Provisional Government had exiled the abdicated Russian emperor and his family, leading an armed detachment with an order from the Bolshevik leadership to deliver Nicholas II to Yekaterinburg.

In the spring of 1918, all the Romanovs who had been exiled from Petrograd to the Urals were constantly being moved from one place to another. According to the surviving documents, these movements took place under the careful control of the Ural Bolsheviks in Ekaterinburg, who in turn were controlled by the All-Russian leadership based in the capitals — Petrograd and Moscow.

Upon their arrival in Ekaterinburg in April 1918, the exiles were accommodated in the Atamansky Rooms Hotel (at the beginning of the 21st century the building housed the FSS and the Sverdlovsk Oblast Home Affairs Department). On May 7, 1918, Grand Duchess Elizabeth Feodorovna was arrested in Moscow and exiled to Perm. From there, she was later transported to Ekaterinburg and placed in the Novo-Tikhvin Monastery. Accompanying her were Sister Barbara (Yakovleva) and Sister Ekaterina (Yanysheva).

After the transfer of the former tsar, tsarina and their daughter Maria to Ekaterinburg on April 30, 1918, and the subsequent transfer of the rest of the royal family from Tobolsk in mid-May, the Ural Bolsheviks realized that there would be too large a "concentration" of Romanovs in the city. Therefore, they decided to "disperse" some of them to other locations. As a result, the Grand Dukes were moved to Alapayevsk, according to a resolution of the Ural Regional Council dated May 18, 1918. On May 20 of the same year, the exiles arrived in Alapayevsk.

The Council of Commissars of the Petrograd Workers' Commune has decided:

Members of the former Romanov family—Nikolai Mikhailovich Romanov, Dmitry Konstantinovich Romanov, and Pavel Alexandrovich Romanov—are to be exiled from Petrograd and its environs until further notice. They are permitted to choose their place of residence freely within the Vologda, Vyatka, and Perm provinces. Sergei Mikhailovich Romanov, Gavriil Konstantinovich Romanov, Yevgeny Konstantinovich Romanov, Konstantin Konstantinovich Romanov, Igor Konstantinovich Romanov, and Vladimir Pavlovich Paley are to be exiled from the same areas until further notice, with the right to freely choose their place of residence within the Vyatka and Perm provinces. All the aforementioned individuals are required to report within three days from the date of publication of this decree to the Extraordinary Commission for Combating Counterrevolution and Speculation (Gorokhovaya Street, 2) in order to obtain certificates of passage to their chosen places of permanent residence and to proceed to their destination within the time specified by the Extraordinary Commission.

The change of the chosen place of residence is permitted with the permission of the respective Soviets of Workers', Soldiers', and Peasants' Deputies.

Chairman of the Workers' Commune G. Zinoviev.

Commissar of Internal Affairs M. Uritsky.

Manager of affairs S. Gusev.

"Krasnaya gazeta" (Petrograd). 26 March 1918

== Arrest and death ==
In Alapayevsk, the exiles were housed in the local Napolnaya School on the outskirts of the city. The Alapayevsk Soviet of Workers' and Peasants' Deputies and the Extraordinary Investigative Commission of Alapayevsk were entrusted with the supervision of the detainees. At first in the city, the regime of imprisonment was relatively lenient. All prisoners received identity cards allowing them to move "only within Alapayevsk." To leave the building, it was sufficient to notify the guard.

The "escape" of Grand Duke Mikhail Alexandrovich on June 12–13, 1918, was used as an excuse to transfer all the exiled Romanovs to the Urals under a strict regime of imprisonment. The Ural Bolsheviks coordinated their actions with Moscow and Petrograd.

In Alapayevsk the order to tighten the regime came from Ekaterinburg on June 21, 1918: "All their property was confiscated: shoes, underwear, dresses, pillows, gold objects and money; only worn clothes and shoes and two changes of underwear were left..." They were forbidden to go out in the city and correspondence, along with limited food rations. At the same time, Sister Catherine of the Marfo-Mariinsky Convent, who had accompanied Elizabeth Feodorovna, along with two lackeys and the doctor Helmersen, were expelled. A little later, Helen of Serbia (wife of Prince John Konstantinovich), who renounced her foreign citizenship to be near her husband, and also left the Napolnaya School.

On the night of July 18, 1918, the prisoners of the Napolnaya School were taken to an unknown destination, after which reports of their deaths soon appeared.

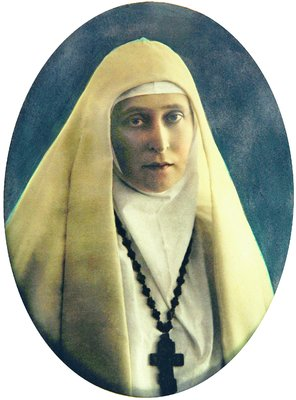
Elizabeth Fyodorovna (52 years)

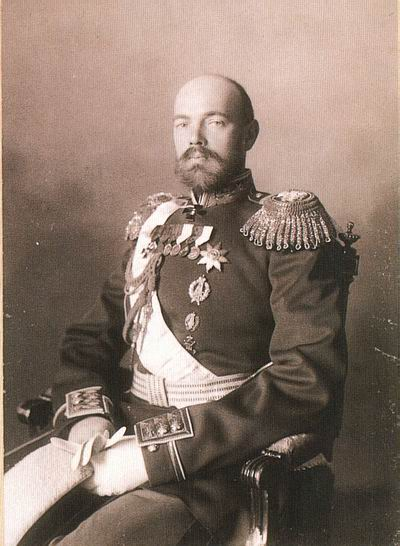
Sergei Mikhailovich (48 years)

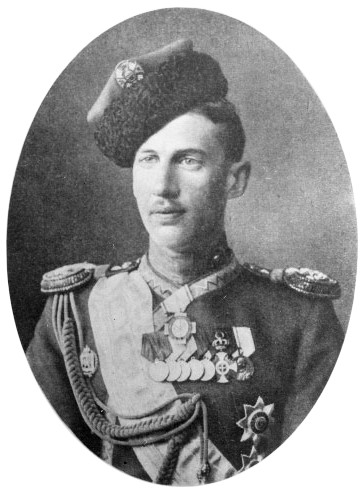
John Konstantinovich (32 years)

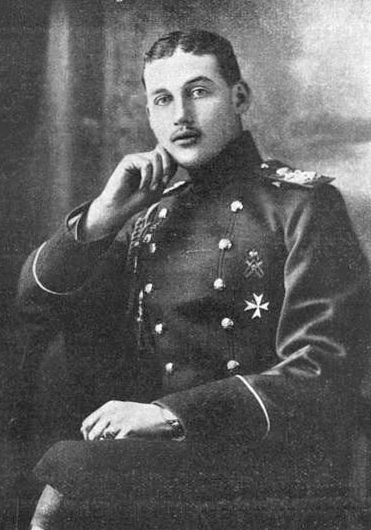
Konstantin Konstantinovich (27 years)

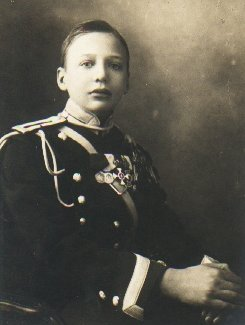
Igor Konstantinovich (24 years)

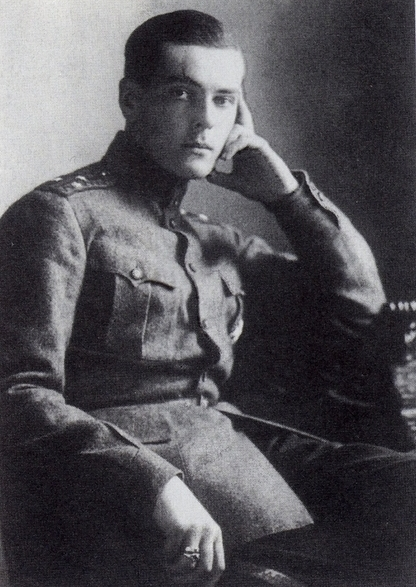
Vladimir Paley (21 years)

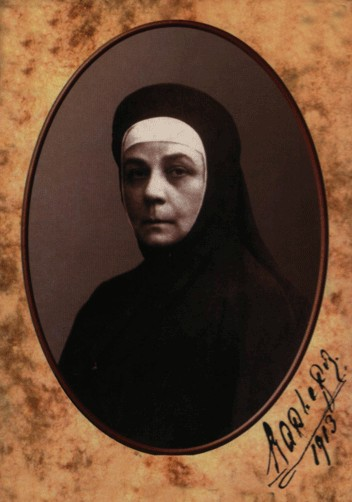
Nurse Barbara (Yakovleva) (about 38 years)

=== "Disappearance" of arrested ===
On the night of July 18, at three o'clock in the morning, shots were fired and grenades exploded in the building of the Napolnaya School. The Red Army detachment was called to the scene and spent an hour cordoning off the building. Then Commissar A. Smolnikov came out and informed them that the White Army had abducted the princes by airplane. The Alapayevsk Executive Committee immediately sent the following telegram to Yekaterinburg:

Military Yekaterinburg

Ural Administration

On the morning of July 18, a gang of unknown armed men attacked the Napolnaya School where the Grand Dukes were accommodated. The attack lasted for two hours, during which one bandit was killed and there were apparently some wounded. The princes and their servants managed to escape in an unknown direction. When the Red Army detachment arrived, the bandits had fled into the forest and could not be apprehended. The search for them continues.

Alapayevsk Executive Committee

Abramov

Perminov

Ostanin

Based on this telegram, the chairman of the Ural Regional Council, A. G. Beloborodov, sent a telegram to Y. M. Sverdlov, M. S. Uritsky, and G. E. Zinoviev. On July 26, an official report on the incident was published.

"The dukes' kidnapping"

The Alapayevsk Executive Committee reports from Ekaterinburg about an attack on the morning of July 18 by an unknown gang on the premises where the former Grand Dukes Igor Konstantinovich, Konstantin Konstantinovich, Ivan Konstantinovich, Sergei Mikhailovich, and Paley were being held. Despite the guards' resistance, the princes were abducted. There are casualties on both sides. The search is ongoing.

Signed: Chairman of the Regional Council Beloborodov

— News from the Perm Province Executive Committee of the Soviets of Workers', Peasants' and Army Deputies, No. 145.

On the morning of July 18, notices were posted in the city informing that the princes had been kidnapped by a gang of White Guards. During the firefight, one of the kidnappers was killed and two Red Guards were lightly wounded. The fate of Grand Duchess Elisabeth Feodorovna and the Sister was not mentioned in the official reports. The official bodies of Alapayevsk and Ekaterinburg conducted an investigation, which was inconclusive. In August 1918 in Alapayevsk there was a sale of things of the princes as missing.

=== Performance version's opinions ===
Emigrant researchers considered this event to be a staged kidnapping of the princes, based on the research materials of N. A. Sokolov. Mikhail Dieterichs was the first to write about this in his memoirs. During the preparation of materials for canonization of new martyrs in the Center of documentation of public organizations of the Sverdlovsk oblast was found Transcript of memoirs of party members of Alapayevsky area 1917-1918. (The meeting was held on January 6, 1933 and had the purpose of "preserving for history the memories of the Bolshevik Party organization of the Alapayevsky district in the period from the February Revolution of 1917 to 1921"). According to the memoirs of E. L. Seryodkin, the chairman of the Verkhne-Sinyachka Council, and N. P. Govyrin, the chairman of the Extraordinary Investigative Commission, the Alapayevsk prisoners were killed and their kidnapping was staged.

== Investigation ==
At the end of September 1918, Alapayevsk came under the control of Admiral Kolchak. An investigation about the deaths of the prisoners was opened. On October 11, 1918, the investigation was opened by I. A. Sergeyev, a member of the Yekaterinburg District Court. On February 7, 1919 it was taken over by N. A. Sokolov, an investigator of important cases of the Omsk District Court (who also investigated the murder of the Romanov family).

The investigation revealed that on the night of July 18, under the pretext of transferring prisoners from Alapayevsk to the Verkhne-Sinyachikhinsky plant, a group of workers from the Nevyansk and Verkhne-Sinyachikhinsky plants led by Pyotr Startsev arrived at the school building.

We entered the building where the women were being held through an unlocked door. We woke them up and informed them that they needed to get dressed immediately because they had to be taken to a safe place due to the risk of an armed raid.

They complied without complaint. We tied their hands behind their backs, blindfolded them, took them outside, and placed them in a wagon that had been waiting near the school, and then sent them to their destination.

Next, we entered the room occupied by the men. We delivered the same instructions as we had to the women. The young Grand Dukes Konstantinovich and Prince Paley also complied without argument. We led them into the corridor, blindfolded them, tied their hands behind their backs, and placed them into another carriage. We had previously decided that the carriages would move separately. The Grand Duke Sergei Mikhailovich was the only one who attempted to resist. (Memories of Vasily Ryabov, one of those involved in the assassination).

Grand Duke Sergei Mikhailovich resisted, but was shot in the arm and then placed into the carriage. The prisoners were taken outside the city to one of the abandoned mines of the Nizhnyaya Selimskaya Iron Mine. After being struck on the head with a part of an axe, they were thrown into the mine. The mine was then bombarded with grenades, covered with poles and logs, and sealed with earth. When the bodies were later removed from the mine, it was found that some victims had died almost instantly, while others, who had survived the fall, succumbed to starvation and wounds. For example, Prince John's wound was bandaged with part of Grand Duchess Elizabeth Feodorovna’s apostolnik, and the bodies of Prince Paley and Sister Varvara were found in a semi-seated position. The surrounding peasants reported that for several days they could hear prayers being sung from the mine. A participant in the murder recalled that after the first grenade was thrown into the mine, a troparion to the True Cross was sung from within: "Save, O Lord, Thy people, and bless Thy possession; grant victory to those who resist, and preserve Thy dwelling by Thy cross".

Other sources claim that the deaths of the condemned were almost instantaneous, and rumors of underground prayers and mutual aid among the condemned are considered to be folk legends.

The recollections of E. L. Seryodkin, chairman of the Verkhne-Sinyachikha Council, and N. P. Govyrin, chairman of the Special Investigation Commission, confirm the fact established by Kolchak's investigation that the prisoners were thrown into the mine alive:

We wanted to lower them to the bottom, but they didn’t reach the bottom; there was a bridge, and they stopped there and ended up alive. We intended to blow up the mine, so we lowered the explosives, but they ended up in the water. To ensure their deaths, something else needed to be done. I had bombs in the closet, so I gave the key to K... to bring them. Then we buried him like that. I had a purse with the Prince's tobacco; I wanted to keep it, but then I thought they might find it, so I threw it in there too. (— Memories of E. L. Seryodkin, Chairman of the Verkhne-Sinyachikha Council).

It also follows from the above transcript that the decision to execute the Alapayevsk prisoners was made independently by the Bolshevik party organization of Alapayevsk, without the sanction of the Uralobcom of the RCP(b) and the Ural Council. However, from the interrogation of the Chekist Peter Startsev, who participated in the murder, it follows that "the murder of the August prisoners was carried out on the orders of Ekaterinburg, and that Safarov came specifically to direct it from there". Given G.I. Safarov's involvement in organizing the murder of the Romanov family in Ekaterinburg, investigator N.A. Sokolov concludes that "both the murder in Ekaterinburg and the murder in Alapayevsk are the products of the same will of the same persons". The lawyer A. S. Matveev, who worked with materials collected by Grand Duke Andrey Vladimirovich on the Alapayevsk murders, wrote: "It is difficult to determine exactly how the murder took place. There are too few official and verified documents and testimonies. More could have been collected if White counterintelligence had acted with more caution and had not executed many former members of the Grand Dukes' guards without questioning them".

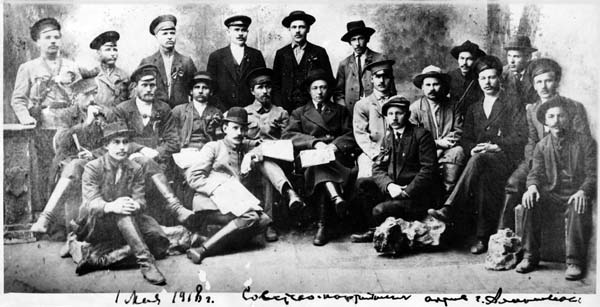
A photograph of Soviet leaders in Alapayevsk, taken in Alapayevsk on May 1, 1918.

In its resolution of 1998 on the termination of criminal case №18/123666-93 "On the investigation of the circumstances of the deaths of members of the Russian Imperial House and persons from their entourage in 1918-1919," the Russian Prosecutor General's Office named 22 individuals and two unidentified persons from the Verkhne-Sinyachikha factory who organized and carried out the "deliberate murder of members of the Russian Imperial House and persons from their entourage" on the night of July 17–18, 1918. Among the organizers listed are Soloviyov Yefim Andreyevich, the commissar of justice of the Alapayevsky Soviet of Workers' and Peasants' Deputies; Nikolai Pavlovich Govyrin, the chairman of the Alapayevsky Extraordinary Investigation Commission; members of the Alapayevsky Extraordinary Investigation Commission; members of the Alapayevsky Soviet of Workers' and Peasants' Deputies; and others. Among the "direct perpetrators of the premeditated murder" are Grigory Pavlovich Abramov, Chairman of the Alapayevsk Soviet of Workers' and Peasants' Deputies; members of the Alapayevsk Extraordinary Investigation Commission; Red Army soldiers; and others.

=== Rumors in exile ===
Matilde Kshessinska, who later married Grand Duke Andrey Vladimirovich, wrote in her memoirs that in 1920, while in France, Andrey Vladimirovich learned that "the judicial investigator for special cases, Sokolov, who had been appointed by Admiral Kolchak to investigate the murder of the Sovereign and the entire royal family in Ekaterinburg, as well as the members of the royal family in Alapayevsk, was in Paris. He was the only one who could reveal what had truly happened in Ekaterinburg and Alapayevsk and whether there was any hope of saving anyone. Andrey invited him to his hotel and asked Gavriil Konstantinovich and his wife to join the conversation, as three of his brothers had been killed in Alapayevsk".

This interested Andrey Vladimirovich due to the persistent rumors at the time suggesting that the victims had been rescued and hidden somewhere, and that Empress Maria Feodorovna was aware of their survival. Sokolov's response dispelled these rescue legends. He confirmed that, regarding Alapayevsk, the murder of the Imperial family members was indeed proven: the bodies were all recovered from the mine, examined, and identified. Sokolov immediately showed us photographs of the bodies. During the examination, a precise list of all items found on them was made. The conversation with Sokolov was somber for us, as it extinguished any remaining hope—everyone was dead.

Sokolov sent the Grand Duke an investigative file, and Andrei and Kschessinska spent almost a whole night copying it.

All the small items found on the bodies were sent by Admiral Kolchak to the Grand Duchess Xenia Alexandrovna, who distributed them to the family members according to their affiliation, in particular, Kshessinska received what was found on her "civilian husband" Grand Duke Sergei Mikhailovich, namely:

- A small, round gold medallion with an emerald in the center contained a photograph of me, which was quite well preserved. Around the photograph was engraved: "August 21 - Malya - September 25". Inside the medallion was a ten-kopeck silver coin from 1869, the year of the Grand Duke's birth. I had given him this medallion many years ago.
- It's a small gold keychain in the shape of a potato, attached to a chain. When they were young, they formed a so-called "potato" circle with the Vorontsovs and Sheremetevs. The origin of this name is obscure, but they all referred to themselves by it, and the expression frequently appears in the tsar's diary when he recounts his time as an heir.

After that, all hopes of error were dispelled.

== Remains history ==
=== Bodies detection ===
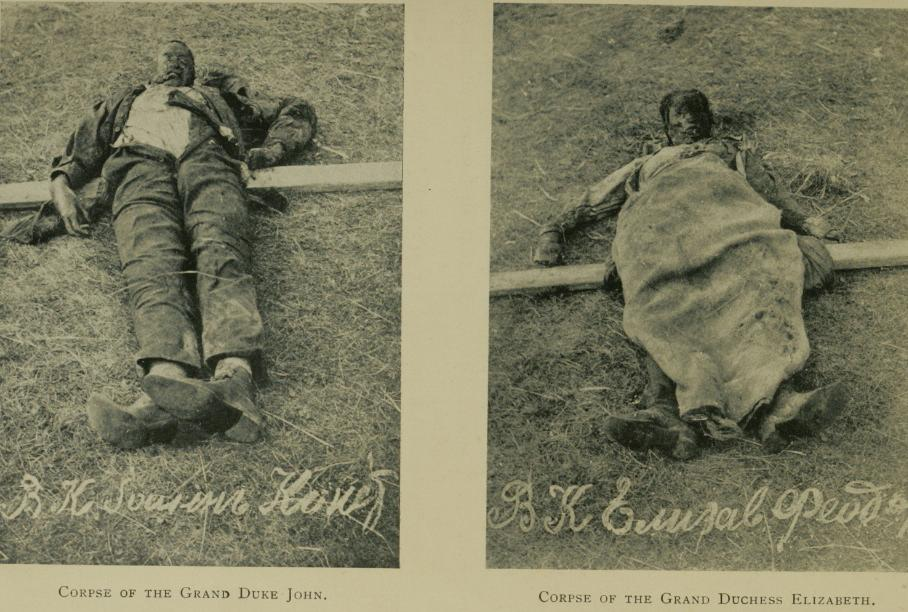
John Konstantinovich and Elizaveta Feodorovna's bodies

On September 28, 1918, Alapayevsk was captured by Admiral Alexander Kolchak's forces. On October 6, N.I. Ostroumov, a deputy prosecutor and commander of the Tobolsk regiment involved in the capture, reported that, according to his information, the Alapayevsk prisoners had been buried alive behind the town in a mine that had been detonated with grenades. The order to search for the bodies was given to Chief Policeman T. Malshikov. He managed to find witnesses who, on the night of July 18, had been returning to Alapayevsk on the Sinyachikha road and saw a “train” of horses heading towards the Verkhne-Sinyachikha factory. Searches were initiated in the vicinity of the Sinyachikhinskaya mine. On October 19, the cap of one of the Grand Dukes was discovered, followed by the recovery of the bodies, which were removed from the mine over the course of four days:

- October 21 — Fyodor Remez;
- October 22 — Sister Barbara and Prince Vladimir Paley;
- October 23 — Princes Konstantin Konstantinovich and Igor Konstantinovich and Grand Duke Sergei Mikhailovich;
- October 24 — Grand Duchess Elizabeth Feodorovna and Prince John Konstantinovich.

Elizabeth Feodorovna, the Sister Barbara and Prince John Konstantinovich's fingers of the right hands were folded in the sign of the cross. On the Grand Duchess's breast there was a picture of Jesus Christ set with gemtones, and in the pocket of Prince John Konstantinovich's coat there was an icon given to him by John of Kronstadt.

Medical examinations and forensic autopsies were conducted after the bodies were recovered from the mine:

According to those who participated in the removal of the bodies from the mine, only Grand Duke Sergei Mikhailovich had a bullet wound in the back of his head at the base of the skull. The other victims, who had been tortured and thrown into the mine alive, died from the injuries sustained in the fall and from starvation. Despite having been in the mine for several months, Grand Duchess Elisabeth Feodorovna's body was found almost completely intact. Her face retained a serene expression, and her right hand was positioned in a cross, as if in blessing. Prince John Konstantinovich's body also showed only partial and slight decomposition, primarily in the chest area, while the remaining bodies were in varying stages of decomposition.

According to the results of the examination and autopsy, all the bodies were in a state of severe decomposition, making it impossible to determine their age.

After the autopsy, the bodies were washed, dressed in clean white clothes, and placed in wooden coffins with iron covers. The coffins were then moved to the cemetery church of Alapayevsk, where a memorial service was held, and the Unsaved Psalter was read. On October 31, a council of 13 priests conducted an all-night vigil service at the coffins. The following day, November 1, a large procession left from the Cathedral of the Holy Trinity in Alapayevsk and proceeded to the cemetery church. There, the funeral liturgy was celebrated, and the coffins were transported to the cathedral.The bodies were then interred in a tomb located on the south side of the altar of the Cathedral of the Holy Trinity, and the entrance to the tomb was walled up.

=== Relocation in Russia ===
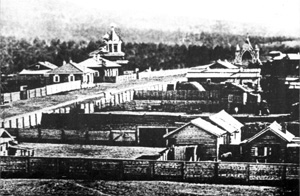
Chita Convent

With the advance of the Red Army in June 1919 it was decided to remove the remains from the city. At the request of Hegumen Seraphim (Kuznetsov), the abbot of the Seraphimo-Alexeyev skete of the Belogorsk St. Nicholas Monastery, who was in Ekaterinburg, General M. K. Diterikhs received permission from Admiral Kolchak to transport the coffins. On July 14, 1919, eight coffins were loaded into a freight car for shipment Chita. Hegumen Seraphim (Kuznetsov) accompanied the bodies with two novices, Seraphim Gnevashev and Maxim KaSisternikov. According to the memories of Hegumen Seraphim, recorded by Princess M. A. Putyatina (in monasticism, Seraphima), niece of the last imperial envoy to China, on the way it was hot and humid, and:

A liquid was constantly leaking from the crevices of five coffins, spreading a terrible stench. The train would often stop in the middle of a field, where they would collect grass to wipe the coffins. The liquid that flowed from the Grand Duchess's coffin had a fragrant odor, and they carefully collected it in bottles as a shrine.

The train arrived in Chita on August 30. The coffins were taken to the Bogoroditsky (Pokrovsky) Convent with the assistance of the ataman Grigory Semyonov, where they were placed under the floor of the cell where Hegumen Seraphim resided.

On March 5, 1920, on the order of General Diterikhs and with the support of Ataman Semenov, the coffins were removed from Chita and sent to China. Maria Mikhailovna, Ataman Semyonov's former wife, who had received a divorce settlement in the form of gold ingots, provided financial assistance for the transportation.

=== The removal abroad ===
Hegumen Seraphim traveled to the Hailar station without a guard. However, upon arrival, he found that control of the city had shifted to the Bolsheviks, who seized his carriage:

Ioann Konstantinovich's coffin was targeted for mistreatment by the Bolsheviks, who intended to desecrate all of them. However, I managed to quickly appeal to the Chinese commander of the troops. He promptly sent his soldiers, who intervened just as they were about to open the first coffin. From that moment on, both I and the coffins were under the protection of the Chinese and Japanese military authorities, who were very sympathetic and provided protection both on-site and during the journey to Beijing...

In early March, the bodies arrived in Harbin, where they were received by Bishop Nestor (Anisimov) of Kamchatka. Later, Prince Nikolai Kudashev, the last imperial envoy to China, arrived in the city. Under his supervision, the coffins were opened for identification, and a protocol was drawn up. The Prince later recalled that all the bodies, except for Elizabeth Feodorovna's, were in a state of complete decomposition:

The coffins were opened and placed in the Russian church. When I entered, I felt almost sick and then vomited violently. The Grand Duchess lay there as if she were alive and had not changed at all since the day I had seen her off in Moscow before I left for Beijing, except for a large bruise on one side of her face from the fall into the mine.

On April 8, the train left Harbin for Mukden, and from there, it traveled to Beijing, arriving on April 13. Archbishop Innokenty (Figurovsky), the head of the Russian Theological Mission, was informed about the arrival of the bodies by Archbishop Mefodiy (Gerasimov) of Orenburg, who was in exile in Harbin. Archbishop Innokenty began negotiations on the possibility of their burial on the mission’s grounds. However, the Russian Embassy did not participate in resolving the issue, and due to the prohibition imposed by the Chinese authorities against bringing the bodies into Beijing, it was decided to bury them in the cemetery of the Russian Spiritual Mission, located outside the city limits.

=== The fate of the stopovers in China ===
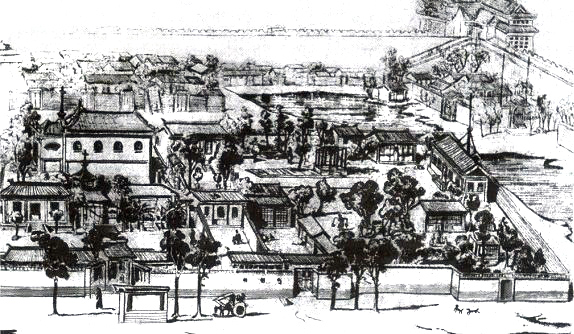
View of the northern palace of the Russian Spiritual Mission in Beijingg

On April 16, 1920, the coffins were met by a procession at the Beijing railway station and transported to the Church of St. Seraphim of Sarov, located in the cemetery north of the Russian Theological Mission, behind the Andingmun Gate, about 2 km from the city. After the funeral service, the eight coffins were sealed with the seals of the Russian Theological Mission and placed in one of the tombs in the cemetery. Shortly afterward, with funds provided by Ataman G. M. Semyonov, an ambon was constructed under the pulpit of the church, where the bodies of the Alapayevsk martyrs were interred. In November 1920, the remains of Elizabeth Feodorovna and Sister Barbara were reburied in Jerusalem.

Before leaving, Hegumen Seraphim entrusted the keys to the crypt to Bishop Innocent, head of the spiritual mission. Over time, the burial of the Grand Dukes was largely forgotten:

The old coffins of the Grand Dukes are simple iron boxes, with corrosion evident in many places. The portraits on the coffins of Grand Duke Sergei Mikhailovich and Grand Duke John Konstantinovich are partially decayed. All the coffins bear simple copper plates with the names of the deceased. On Prince Paley's coffin, the inscription has been erased, leaving only the words "...your mother" visible.

The crypt is stuffy and emits a smell of decay. Inside the tightly closed iron coffins, the decomposition of the bodies is ongoing but slow.

The care of the crypt and its contents was solely the responsibility of the Beijing Ecclesiastical Mission and its Metropolitan. In the church, the Metropolitan employed two Russian guards to supervise the cemetery and the tombs of the Grand Dukes.

— The newspaper Zarya. Harbin. 1931. № 33

By 1930, the church was in a state of complete disrepair: "The plaster had collapsed, the roof leaked badly, the wooden floor had rotted and settled. The coffins of the Alapayevsk martyrs also needed immediate replacement". A collection was organized, but the funds raised were minimal. Eventually, new coffins were made, and the bodies of the princes were transferred into these new coffins and returned to the crypt. According to Dr. Peter Sudakov, who was present at the transfer of the remains, the bodies were well-preserved due to embalming, and the faces of the deceased were still recognizable. Only the body of Vladimir Paley, at the request of his mother, was buried in one of the crypts of the cemetery for the spiritual mission.

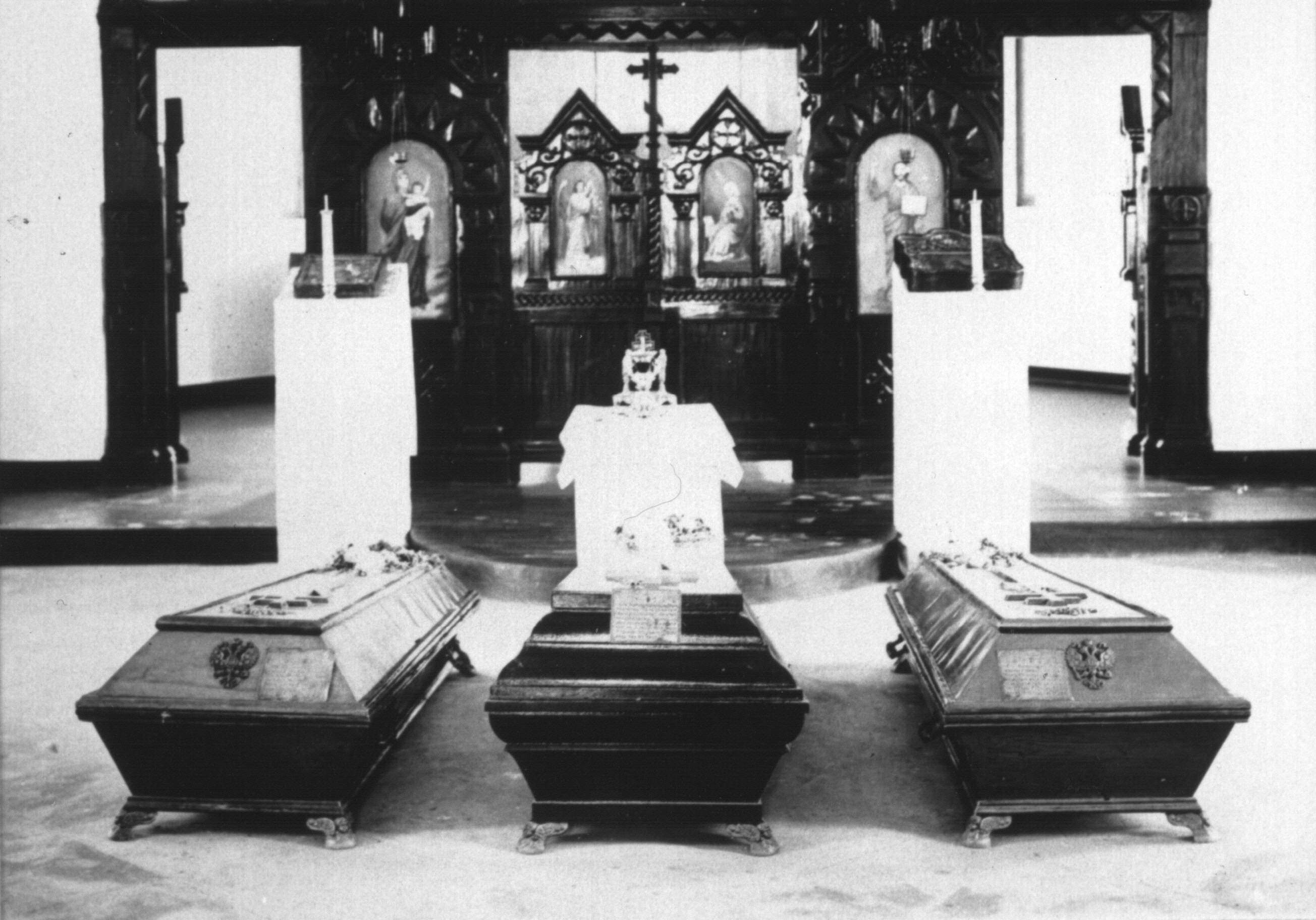
Coffins with the bodies of Grand Duke Sergey Mikhailovich, Princes John and Konstantin Konstantinovich in the crypt of the church in the name of All Saints Martyrs.

In 1938, after the Japanese occupation of China, Archbishop Viktor (Svyatin) received permission from the Beijing authorities to transfer the coffins of the Martyrs of Alapayevsk to the crypt of the Church of All Saints Martyrs on the territory of the Russian Theological Mission. In 1947, due to the threat of the advancing Communist regime, Archbishop Viktor authorized the Vicar of the Assumption Monastery of the Theological Mission, Archimandrite Gabriel, and Hieromonk Nicholas to move the remains of the Martyrs under the pretext of repairing the church. The remains were buried under the floor of the side chapel of Apostle Simon the Zealot. Hieromonk Nicholas later wrote: "The grave was covered with stone slabs: 4 arshins long, ¾ arshin wide, and about 3 inches thick. The slabs were covered with sand and cemented; on top of them, artificial slabs of 8x8 vershky, which covered the entire floor of the temple, were laid and joined with cement. There are no external signs of a tomb in the temple".

In 1945, the Church of the Holy Martyrs was transferred to the jurisdiction of the Russian Orthodox Church, but in 1954, after the transfer of the land of the spiritual mission to the Soviet Embassy, it was closed. In 1957, by order of the Soviet Ambassador to the People's Republic of China, P. F. Yudin, the church was demolished and replaced by a playground and embassy buildings.

In the period from February 22 to 25, 2005, work was conducted on the territory of the Russian Embassy in Beijing to locate the site of the former Church of All Saints Martyrs. The search determined the possible location of the underground crypt. Testimonies from workers involved in the demolition revealed that the remains had not been disturbed and were covered with earth during the building's demolition. Currently, the remains of the Alapayevsk martyrs, except for the bodies of Elizabeth Feodorovna and Sister Varvara, are considered lost. Additionally, according to a letter from Bishop Basil of Beijing to His Holiness Patriarch Alexy, when the churches in Beiguan were closed, all relics were transferred to the Seraphic Church in the Orthodox cemetery of Beijing. This cemetery was later transformed into Youth Lake Park, and it is possible that the remains of the Alapayevsk martyrs might still be there, possibly under the golf course where the Seraphim Church once stood.

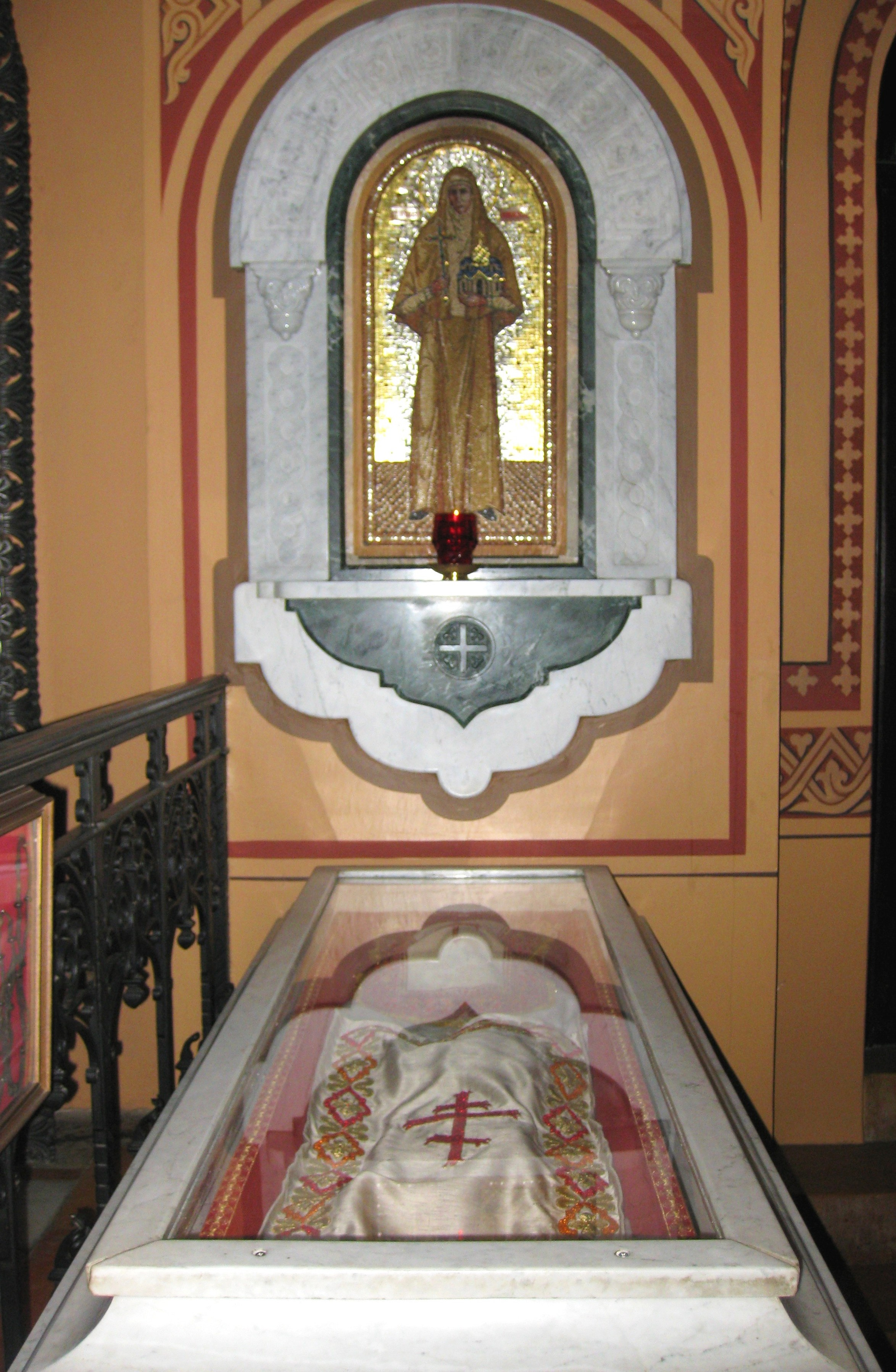
The tomb with the relics of St. Elizabeth

=== Transportation of the remains of Elizabeth Feodorovna and Sister Barbara to Jerusalem ===
In November 1920, at the request of Elizabeth Feodorovna's sister, Princess Victoria von Battenberg, and in fulfillment of her own wish to be buried in the Holy Land, two coffins (Grand Duchess Elizabeth and Sister Barbara) were transported from Beijing to Tianjin, then to Shanghai, and from there by sea through the Suez Canal to Port Said (Egypt) and then to Jerusalem. The coffins were accompanied by Hegumen Seraphim (Kuznetsov), who was joined in Port Said by Princess Victoria with her husband Louis and daughter Louise. On January 28, 1921, in Jerusalem, the bodies of the martyrs were solemnly received by the Greek and Russian clergy, along with numerous Russian emigrants. The coffins were transported to the city by automobile. Along the route, they were met by a procession of Sisters from the Gorno and Eleon monasteries.

The bodies were brought to the Church of Mary Magdalene in Gethsemane. For two days at them the funeral services were held, and on January 30 the Patriarch of Jerusalem Damian has made a funeral liturgy and on the great entrance has read the prayer of indulgence to the victims, and then after the funeral services the coffins have been placed in a crypt, arranged in a crypt of the church. After the glorification of the princess and the Sister in the face of saints by the Russian Orthodox Church on May 1, 1982, on the day of celebration of the Week of the holy myrrhbearing women, their relics were transferred from the crypt to the church.

== Canonization and rehabilitation ==
On November 1, 1981 the martyrs of Alapayevsk (except for F. M. Remez) were canonized by the Russian Orthodox Church Outside of Russia (ROC).

Elizabeth Feodorovna and the Sister Barbara were canonized as monastic martyrs by the Council of Bishops of the Russian Orthodox Church in 1992, although Elizabeth did not receive the monastic tonsure. The Cathedral Act states:

Grand Duchess Elizaveta, the founder of the Marfo-Mariinsky Monastery in Moscow, dedicated her pious Christian life to charity, aiding the poor and the sick. Alongside her faithful companion, Sister Barbara, she received the crown of martyrdom on the day of St. Sergius of Radonezh - July 5 (old style), 1918. (— Act on the Canonization of Grand Duchess Elizabeth and Sister Barbara)

The canonization of the other Alapayevsk mine martyrs was not discussed in the ROC.

On March 27, 2009, Maria Vladimirovna Romanova, through her lawyer, filed an application with the Russian Prosecutor General's Office for the exoneration of the relatives of the last Russian tsar Nicholas II. In her statement to the "Interfax" news agency, the lawyer said: "Grand Duchess Maria Vladimirovna believes that all the above-mentioned members of the Russian Imperial House were victims of the arbitrary rule of the totalitarian state and were subjected to political repression on social, class and religious grounds". On June 8, 2009, the Prosecutor General's Office decided to rehabilitate members of the Romanov family and their close associates. The official report stated that the analysis of archival documents "allows us to conclude that all of the above persons were subjected to repression in the form of arrest, expulsion, and being under the supervision of Cheka bodies, without being charged with a specific crime for class and social reasons".

== Bibliography ==
- Мельцер А. М. Алапаевский во имя Новомучеников Российских мужской монастырь // Православная энциклопедия. — М., 2000. — V. I: «А — Алексий Студит». — P. 444. — 752 p. — 40 000 copies. — ISBN 978-5-89572-006-6
- Хрусталёв В. М. Глава XI. Путь на эшафот: Алапаевск // Романовы. Последние дни великой династии. — 1-е. — М.: АСТ, 2013. — P. 652—690. — 861 p. — (Романовы. Падение династии). — 2500 copies. — ISBN 978-5-17-079109-5
