= Religious views of José Rizal =

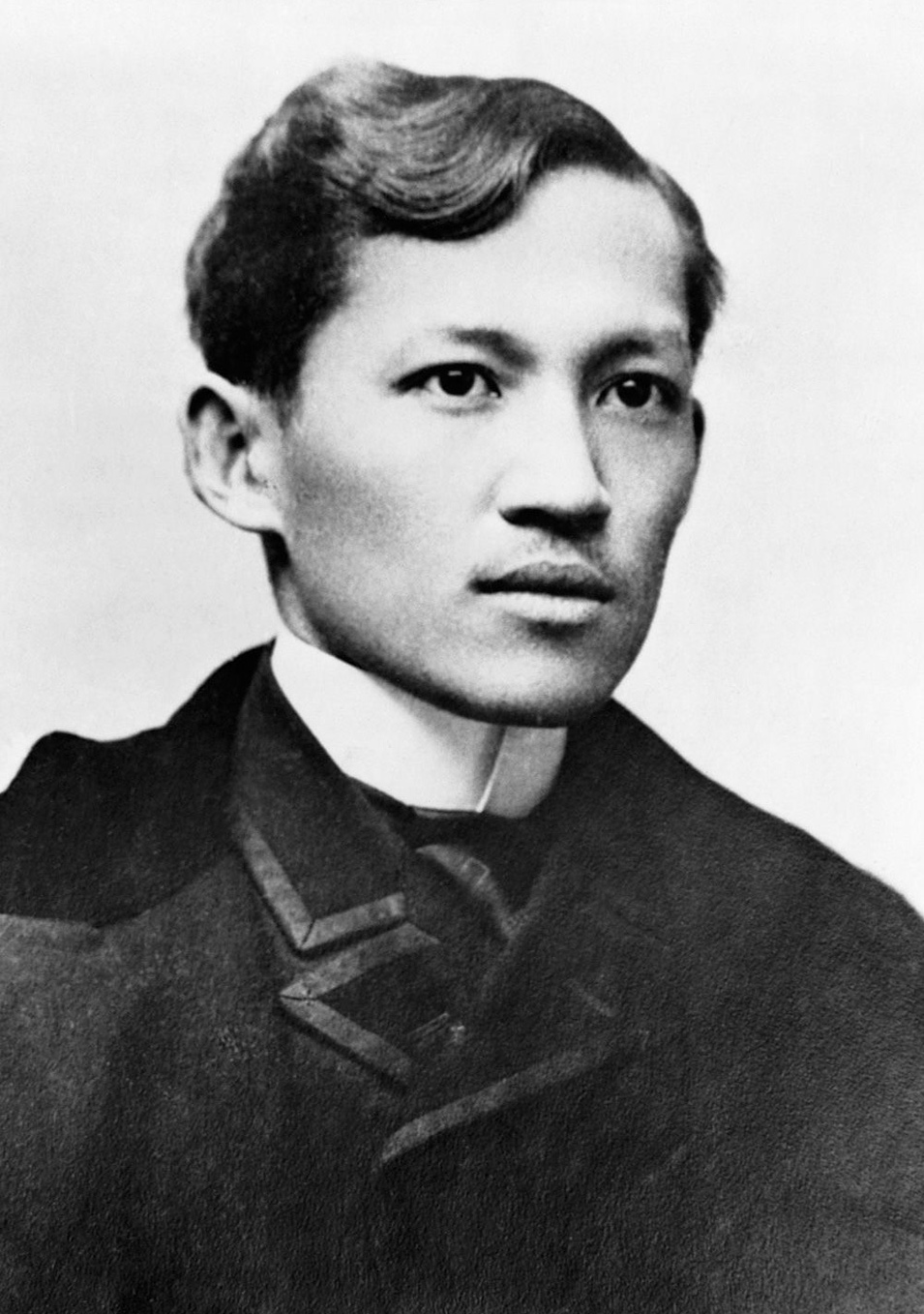
Dr. Jose Rizal

During his exile in Dapitan in 1892, Dr. José Rizal had the opportunity to engage Fr. Pablo Pastells through correspondence. They argued about many things, including the concept of God.

Based on the letters Dr. Rizal wrote, it can be said that his concept of God could be summarized into three notions. First, he believed that God existed. Second, he believed that God was plus supra. Lastly, he believed that God was the origin of nature; that is, nature was the expression of God.

As regards the first notion, Dr. Rizal made explicit that he believed that God existed. He was convinced that a supernatural power behind all creation had to exist. He wrote to Fr. Pastells, "We are entirely in accord in admitting the existence of God: how can I doubt it when I am convinced of my own existence? Who recognizes the effect recognizes the cause." It was clear that Dr. Rizal subscribed to the idea of "necessary-contingent beings" where the contingent being needed other beings for it to exist while the necessary being existed on its own. As such, the necessary being becomes the origin of contingent beings. This necessary being has been labeled by many as "God."

Dr. Rizal considered himself a contingent being that needed other beings to sustain his existence. Such other beings included the origin of all; the necessary being, God. He accepted that he was part of the whole of creation. He could not deny himself. Hence, he could not deny creation. As such, he could not deny God.

As regards the second notion, Dr. Rizal argued that his God was not like the God of the Catholics, as his God was far above such things. He says to Fr. Pastells, "In the conviction that I find myself before the Supreme Problem, which confused voices desire to explain to me, I cannot but answer: 'That may be so; but the God that I surmise is much greater, much better: Plus Supra!" He thought that a requirement to the Godliness of God was His being above all things, which meant His being incomprehensible.

Dr. Rizal was not convinced that a sufficient understanding of God that was as powerful and metaphysical as the Supreme Being could be contained in the consciousness of mere mortals who have no capacity to understand beyond what was in the words of philosopher Friedrich Nietzsche, "divined" to them. Mortals who were so limited could not have possibly comprehended a limitless being. As such, Dr. Rizal articulated that the only genuine faith was "blind faith." In short, the more people tried to explain to him what and who God was, the more he was convinced that they did not know what they were talking about.

What Dr. Rizal meant by "blind faith" was, since it was impossible to comprehend God as He was plus supra, he could have only hinged his belief on the fact that "God was God." As such, he did not deny nor did he accept the religious explanations of the mortals around him. Blind faith was more of a disposition of philosophy than of religion. It was a disposition where one did not accept and deny despite having a personal conviction.

As regards the third notion, Dr. Rizal believed that if one was to "understand" God, he was going to do well to note that books which others claimed were tools of revelation were not reliable. The reason was books were too removed from actual reality as these were written by people, interpreted by others, rewritten by people, obscured by others, etc. The best way to have an idea of God was through connecting with Him personally, directly and physically through His extensions. These extensions were nature.

Dr. Rizal says to Fr. Pastells, "I believe in revelation, yes, but in that living revelation of nature which surrounds us everywhere, in that potent voice, eternal, incessant, incorruptible, clear, distinct, universal like the Being from which it originates, in that revelation which speaks to us and penetrates us from the moment we are born until we die. What books can reveal to us better the goodness of God, His love, His providence, His eternity, His glory, His wisdom?"

Dr. Rizal's philosophico-religious view on God was well-reflected on. It was a product of competent ratiocination by an "Indio" whom the Spaniards then undermined. He did not content himself with the teachings he grew up with as a student of Catholic institutions. He explored, rationalized, and argued. He asked questions about faith and the fundamental teachings of the Church. He was however careful not to offend the religious sensibilities of his countrymen. To him, ratiocination was simply a gift from God. To not use it would thus have been offensive to the Giver.
