= Tsarebozhiye =

Russian heresy about Nicholas II

Tsarebozhiye (Russian: Царебожие, Tsar-as-God) is a radical doctrine in the Russian Orthodox Church that believes Nicholas II is the redeemer of the sins of the Russian people, that for this reason he possessed a special nature, pure of sin, that Russia is the Kingdom of God on earth, and that his death was a collective sin of the Russian people that they must atone for, however, in keeping with the Christ analogy, it is also believed that his death prevented the emergence of the Antichrist.

The propagators of such ideas are very often ultra-conservative Russian nationalists and monarchists. A number of church leaders, in particular Priest Daniil Sysoev, have condemned the doctrine as heretical.

Some of the followers of Tsarebozhiye are united in a small non-canonical "Royal Orthodox Church" (TsPTs), which arose in 2008 on the basis of the "Brotherhood of the Tsar-Redeemer", headed by Vadim Kuznetsov. The "Holy Government Synod" of the TsPTs is headed under the name of Bishop Alexy by the former archpriest of the Russian Orthodox Church Alexander Ivannikov, who was defrocked in 2010.

Tsarebozhiye adherents may also hold other fringe views that exist in part of the Orthodox community such as: the veneration of non-canonical icons, the rejection of insurance policies as well as taxation identification numbers, extreme anti-semitism as a result of belief in the Judeo-Bolshevik conspiracy theory, and the desire to canonize Rasputin, Ivan the Terrible, and Igor Talkov. In this regard, adherents place particular emphasis on giving a sacred meaning to the Russian Empire and the Russian people, who, in their opinion, are "God's chosen". Critics in the mainstream Orthodox church see a connection with the teachings of the Khlysty sect, up to the opinion that those who hold these views are a sect of Khlysts. Comparisons have been drawn to archaic king cults, as well as newer religions such as Rastafari, where the late emperor of Ethiopia is deified, others compare their die-hard fanaticism and fascist-adjacent beliefs to groups such as ISIL and the old Black Hundreds.

== Origins ==
The roots of Tsarebozhiye were planted by White emigres after the Russian Civil War. According to historian Andrei Kostryukov, in the 1920s and 1930s, political and public organizations of the Russian Diaspora actively demanded that the ROCOR leadership officially canonize the royal family. There were also opinion pieces in monarchist newspapers about the death of the emperor as an "expiatory sacrifice." In particular, the sacrifice is mentioned in the so-called "Prophecy of Abel" (published in Harbin in 1931, authenticity is disputed), where the king is directly called "The Redeemer," who accepted the crown of thorns due to the betrayal of the people, and likened to an immaculate lamb.

After the Second World War, the Russian Church Abroad constantly preached about the murder of the Romanovs' being a sin of the Russian people. First Hierarch of the Russian Church Abroad Metropolitan Anastasius (Gribanovsky) gave a sermon in a memorial church in Brussels in 1949, he stated: "The murder of the defenseless Russian monarch left by everyone, together with his wife and young children, will always stand as a heavy reproach to the conscience of the whole world. <...> The time will come when mankind will finally understand that our royal martyrs and all who followed their path, being put to death for witnessing the Truth of God, sacrificed themselves as a sacrifice of purification for the sins of the entire modern world, mired in lies and untruth." It is worth stating that though Church officials did not hold Nicholas II as high as modern Tsarebozhiye, these sermons were the rhetorical root.

On December 22, 1956, the ROCOR Council of Bishops decided to declare June 4/17 a day of universal fasting and repentance. After the requiem on this day, it was prescribed to read a special prayer of repentance, which was sent out to numerous parishes. The Council of Bishops in 1967 decided in all liturgical commemorations to call the emperor "the murdered Tsar-martyr."

== See also ==
- Caesaropapism
- Rastafari
- God-King
