= October 1907 Russian legislative election =

- October 1907

All 442 seats in the State Duma 223 seats needed for a majority
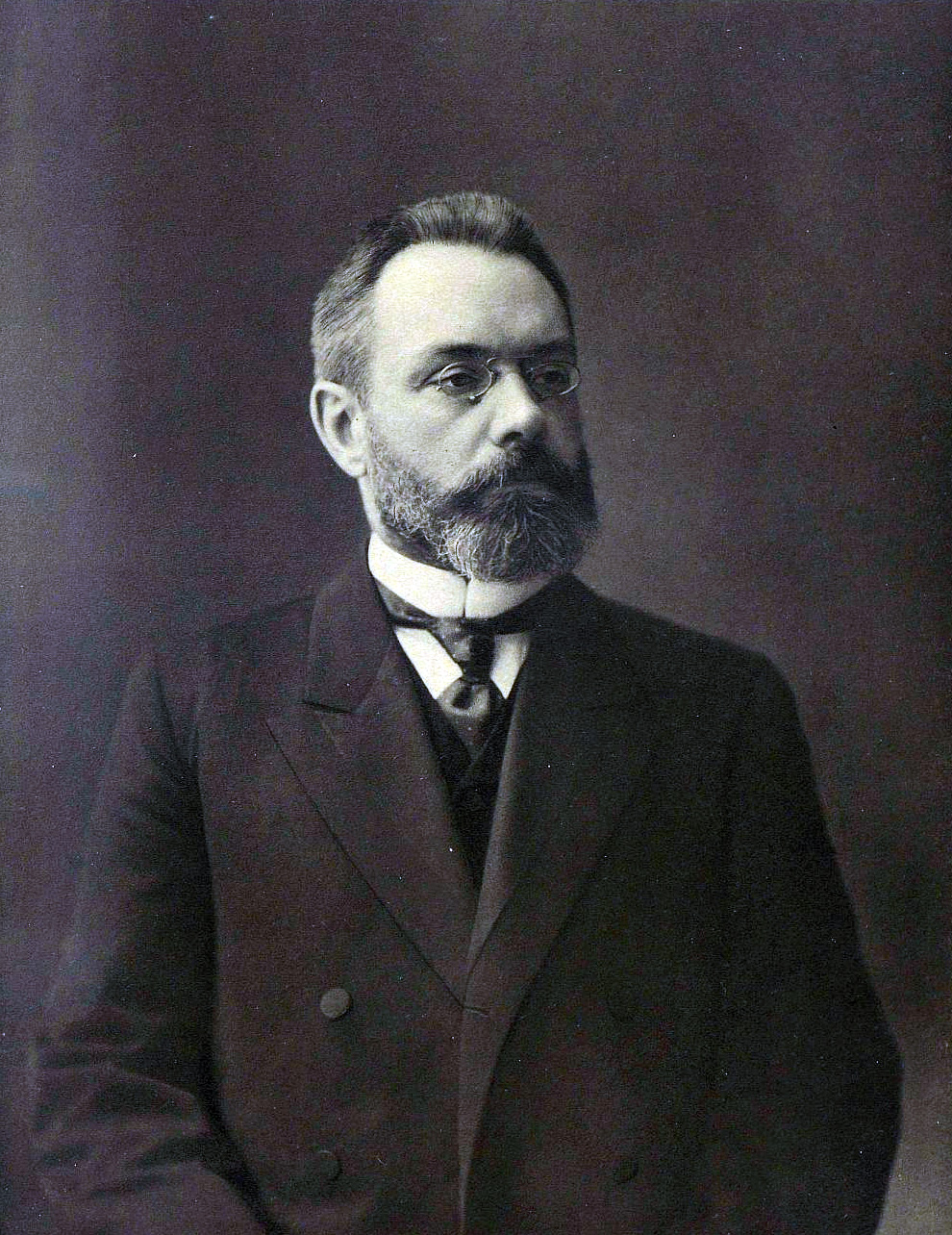

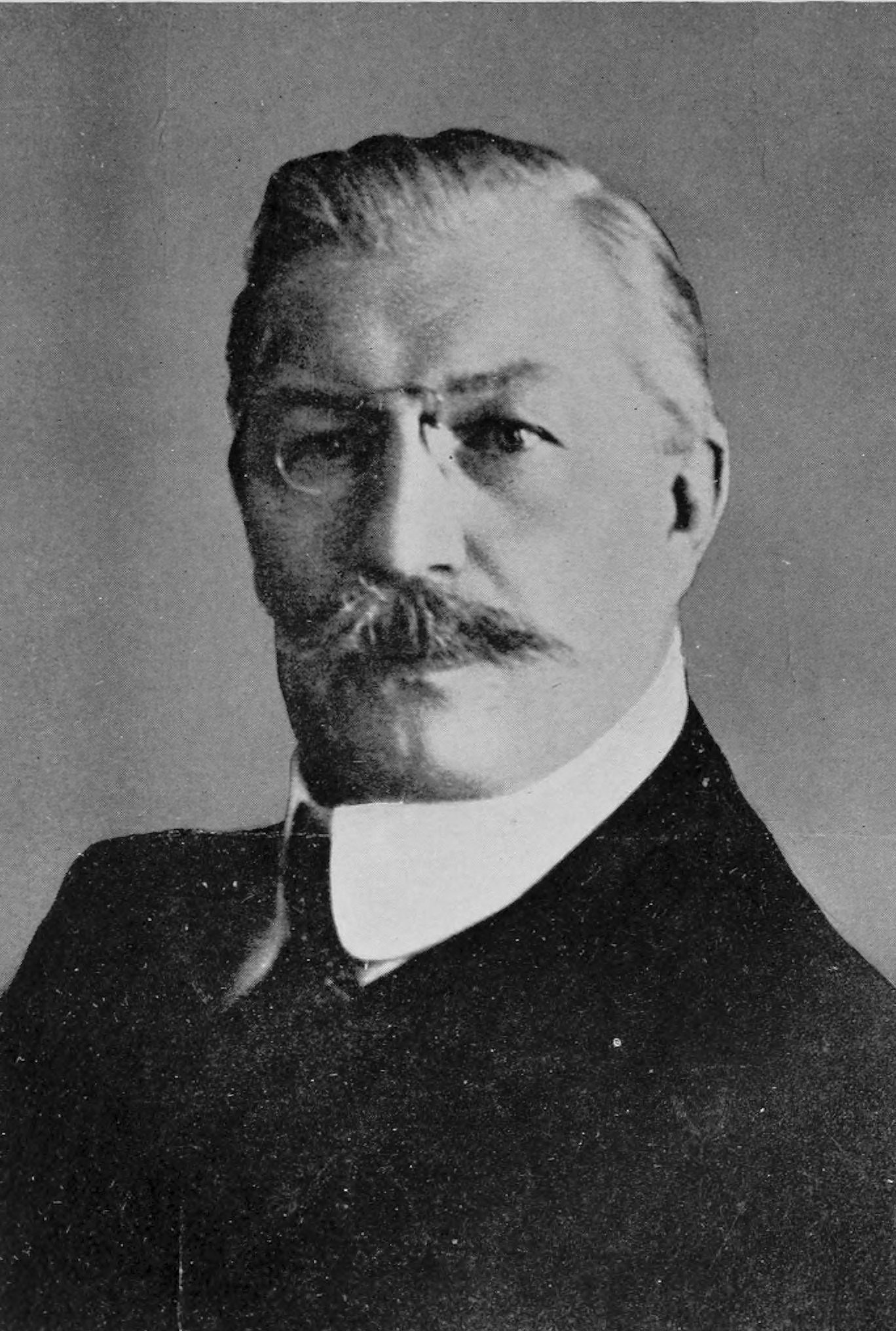

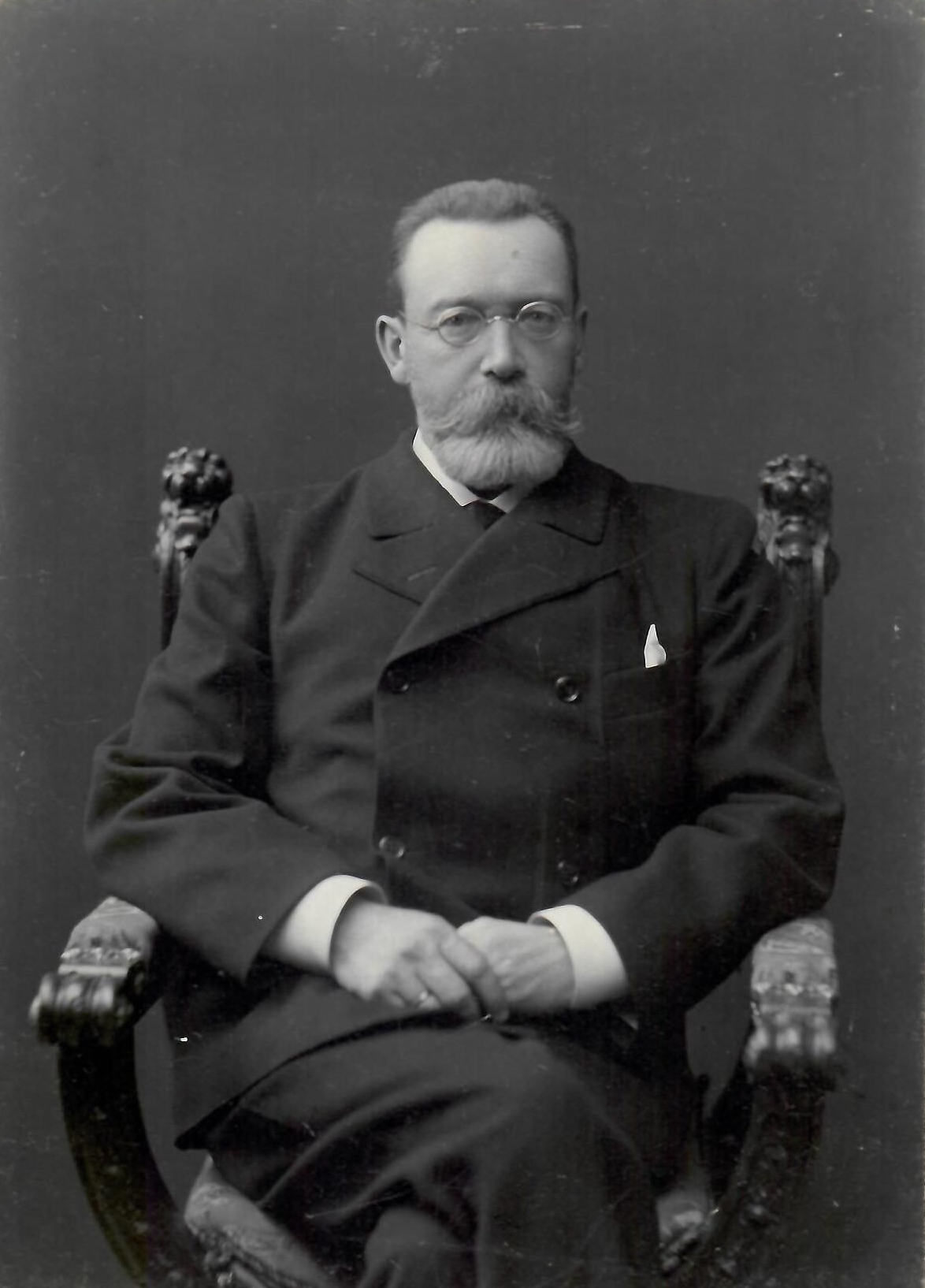

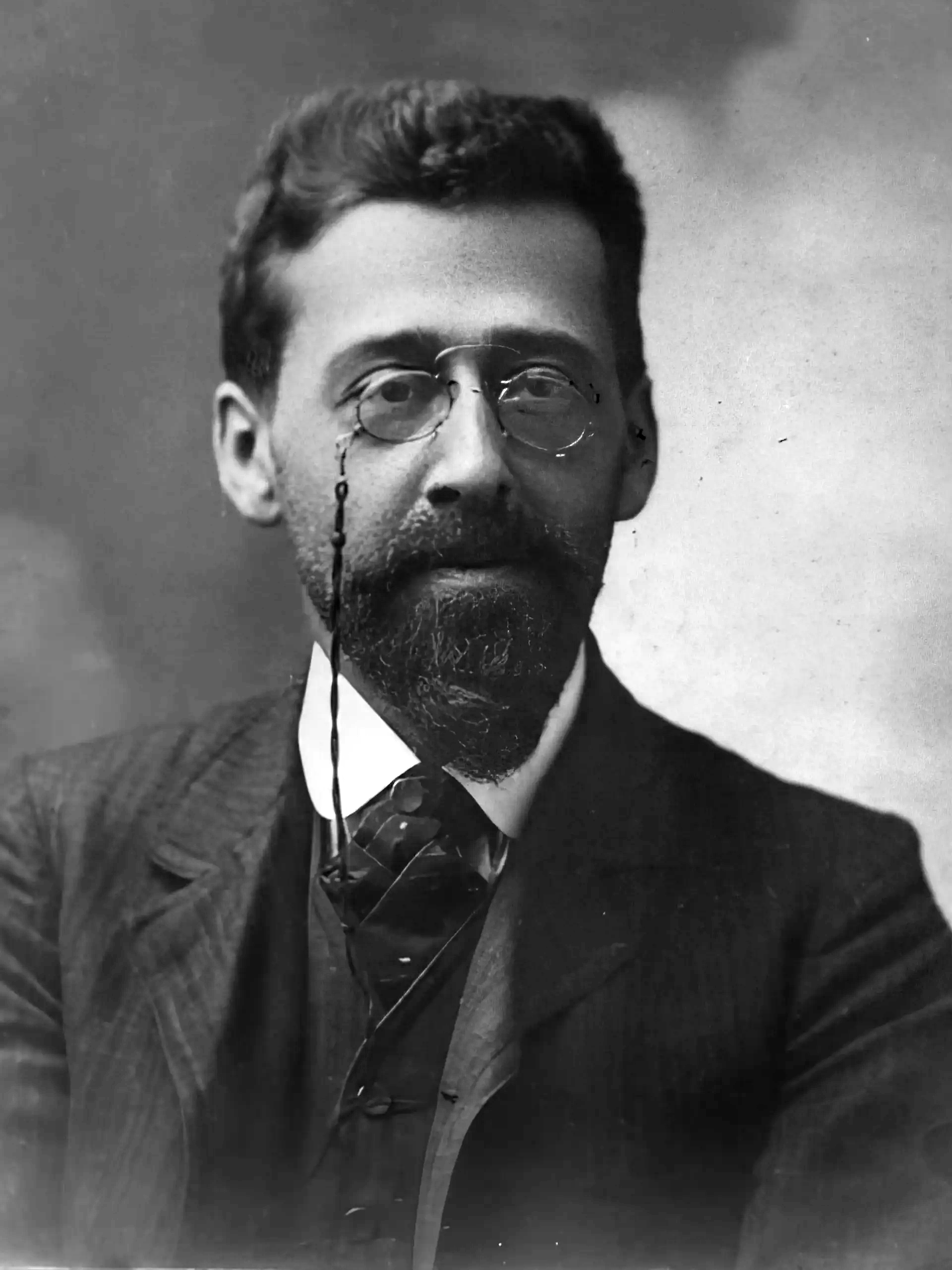

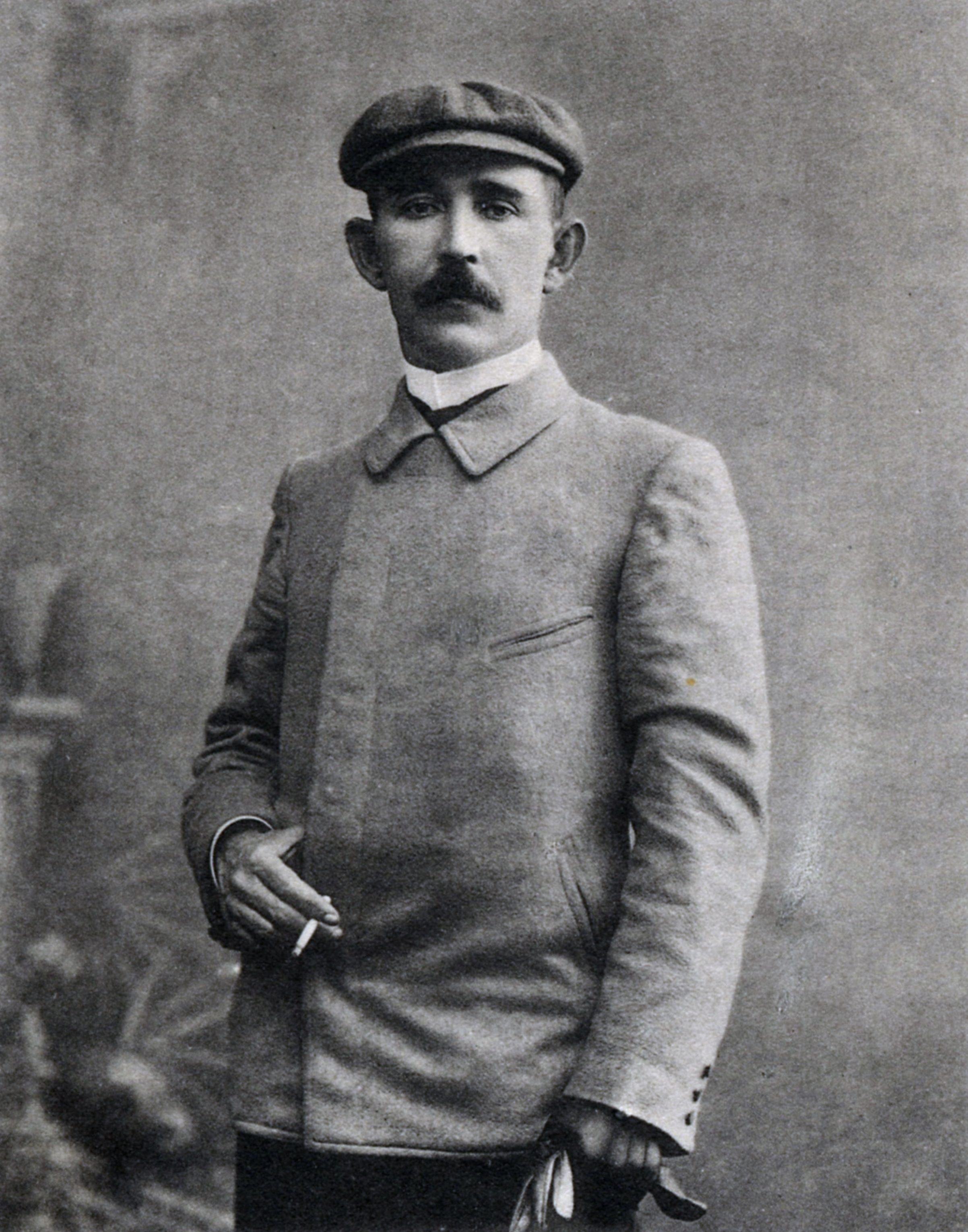
	Majority party	Minority party	Third party
Leader	Alexander Guchkov	Pavel Milyukov	Dmitry Shipov
Party	Octobrist	Kadet	Renovation
Seats won	154	54	28
	Fourth party	Fifth party
Leader	Julius Martov	Alexey Aladyin
Party	RSDLP	Trudoviks
Seats won	19	14
Chairman before election
Fyodor Golovin
Constitutional Democratic Party
Chairman-designate
Nikolay Khomyakov
Union of October 17

Legislative elections were held in the Russian Empire in October 1907 to elect the 442 seats of the Third State Duma. It was the second election to the Duma that year after the January 1907 Russian election.

In June 1907, the Duma was forcibly dissolved by the Russian government, and some of its deputies arrested. Following the dissolution, the laws regarding elections were amended to favour wealthy pro-government Russians. The dissolution, arrest, and new electoral law were all done in violation of the Russian Constitution of 1906 as the Duma did not consent to any of the three actions.

The Union of October 17 emerged as the largest party in the election, winning 154 of the 442 seats. Other rightist parties also made huge gains in the election. Electoral turnout fell massively compared to the prior State Duma elections.

== Second State Duma ==
The second State Duma, focused on discussing questions of agrarian land reform and rights for national minorities in the Empire. Much of the second Duma's agenda was drafted and negotiated in spite of the government and the State Council of the Russian Empire.

== Dissolution and the June coup ==
On 14 June [O.S. 1 June] 1907 Pyotr Stolypin—the Prime Minister of the Russian Empire—spoke before the Duma claiming that there was a plot by the Russian Social-Democratic Labor Party (RSDLP). The accusations were flawed, and included muddled updates and information. Nevertheless, Stolypin demanded the Duma suspend the legal immunity of the accused deputies. The Duma instead established a Special Committee to independently investigate the claims. The Special Committee sat all day on 15 June, and into 1:30 am on the morning of 16 June.

At 5:00 am on 16 June [O.S. 3 June], Tsar Nicholas II forcibly dissolved the State Duma by decree, calling for new elections to begin on 1 September and for the Third Duma to begin on the 1 November. The decree claimed that members of the Duma had been conspiring against the Government and the Tsar. According to the Russian Constitution of 1906, members of the Duma were not meant to be imprisoned without their legal immunity being suspended by the Duma, and being sentenced by a court. Despite this, a number of RSDLP deputies were detained and imprisoned for months without trial, and without State Duma approval.

Quickly following the dissolution, the new Electoral Law 1907 was enacted by decree. The new election laws favoured conservative and rightist elements of the Duma, as well as being particularly bias electorally towards Russians and wealthy landowners. These changes were designed to further disparage peasants and workers, as well as non-Russians in the empire, from influence within the State Duma. The new law also changed the proportion of electors. In total, the Electoral Law 1907 resulted in the number of State Duma members being reduced from 524 deputies down to 442. The Stolypin government hoped that these changes would both promote a maluable duma, whilst still permitting some level of representation.

These series of actions were of dubious legality. The Duma was not supposed to be altered without the approval of the Duma. The imposed new electoral laws, coupled with the forced dissolution of the State Duma, represented a coup d'état by the Stolypin government and Nicholas II.

== Parties and political fractions campaign ==
Only political parties to the right of the Kadets were officially legal.

Extreme Rightist fraction was made up of various far-right political parties, such as Union of the Russian People, Russian Assembly, and the Russian Monarchist Union.

The Union of October 17 (Octoberists) believed the June Coup to be illegal but necessary. The Octoberists also believed that the new electoral laws would benefit them in the upcoming election.

In September 1906, members of the Octobersits split off to found the Party of Peaceful Renovation due to the Octoberists support of repression. The party was initially led by Pyotr Heiden, and was quickly followed by Dmitry Shipov after Heiden's death. In contrast to the Octoberists, the Peaceful Renovationists took a critical opinion of the June Coup, the repeated dissolutions of the Duma, and the Stolypin government.

The Constitutional Democratic Party (Kadets) did not feel confident in whole-heartedly opposing the June Coup. The Kadets had already been damaged by the repression following the Vyborg Appeal after the dissolution of the first Duma, going into the October elections, the party adopted a policy of 'Correct Siege' The Kadets were alarmed at the increasing apathy and alienation regarding the Duma, they attempted to combat among their supporters by supporting engagement with registration and the election.

The Trudoviks had shifted towards the left as frustrations mounted regarding ineffective reform efforts, as well as the moderatism of Kadets. This was furthered by frustrations with the June Coup. Whilst still choosing to participate in the elections, the Trudoviks increasingly took to organising outside of a Duma they considered unreliable.

The Popular Socialist Party was heavily divided on the question of participation in the upcoming elections, with the party's governing body narrowly voting to support participating. The party encouraged its supporters to engage in election campaigning. Hoping to achieve legal legitimacy, the Popular Socialists published a list of members, however this resulted in several of the party's candidates being struck off.

The Socialist Revolutionary Party's Central Committee voted for the party to boycott the upcoming elections altogether and made no serious effort to prepare for them in an official capacity. Despite this, some campaigning was conducted by members and affiliated orgsanisation.

By autumn 1907, the Russian Social-Democratic Labour Party (RSDLP) was suffering organisational difficulty. Bolshevik and Menshevik leaders had been forced abroad due the governments' June crackdown, and many members of the RSDLP Duma group were held in detention without trial for months.

== Registration and electoral process ==
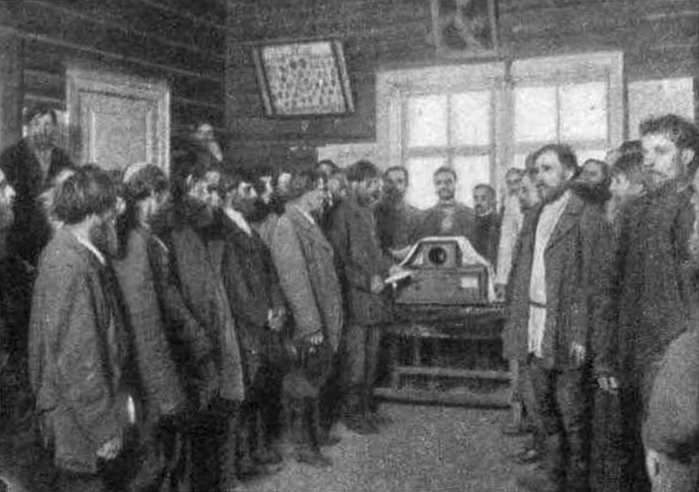
Peasants voting in a township office

The Interior Ministry set 7 July [O.S. 30 June] as the deadline for voter registration, and required that all lists on registration be published by 7 August [O.S. 25 July].

The electoral system divided the electorate into six curiae, three of which were countryside curiae, and three of which were urban. The three rural curiae were big landowners, small landowners, and peasants, with the three city curiae being the urban rich, the urban middle class, and workers.

Big landowners and the urban rich curae were the most favoured by the Electoral Law 1907. Big landowners were automatically registered and could directly participate in Uyezd assemblies Urban rich could also directly participate in Uyezd assemblies. Small landowners had to go through preparatory assemblies prior to the Uyezd ones

Those eligible to be in both the urban rich and middle-class curiae were able to request which one they wished to be listed under. Additionally, those in the urban rich curia could choose to register either in the precinct where they lived, or the one in which they owned businesses, with the first being the default unless they requested otherwise. Landowners with estates spanning multiple counties were registered to the county which they owned the most land. Members of the working class and the peasant class were forbidden from any similar options and were restricted only to their own curiae.

Only workers employed in factories or other businesses with more than 50 workers were entitled to vote in the working-class curia. Around 14% of the working class were not eligible to vote due to this rule. Additionally workers were struck off the electoral register if they undertook strike action Eligible workers would vote for electors at the factory level, before those electors were sent to the Uyezd assemblies. Within big cities, workers were able to vote in direct elections to the Duma. While direct elections primarily benefited the urban working class, the number of cities with direct elections had decreased from seventeen to seven.

State pensioners and nontaxpayers renting an apartment were required to write a letter to apply to register for the middle-class curia. The process to register was time-consuming and invasive. Those who did successfully register could be struck off for voting register for an extensive number of reasons. Women were not allowed to vote.

The repeated forced dissolutions of the Duma, paired with the increased impediments and even less fair voting rules imposed by the Electoral Law 1907 resulted in a huge increase in voter apathy and alienation Worried by the low rate of registration among low-income liberal voters, Kadets, independent lawyers, some newspapers, and other individual politicians attempted to promote electoral participation. Legal aid groups were established to guide voters though the registration process. There were difficulties compiling the updated registration lists, such that local administration struggled keep to the deadline set by the Interior Ministry. Groups trying to promote participation requested to Interior Ministry extended the deadline for registration.

Voter registration lists were at least a third smaller than they had been for the prior election. Registration fell massively in the major cities—they were halved in Odessa, one-third as large in Minsk, less than one-sixth as large in Kiev less than, one-fifth as large in Moscow, and less than one-third St Petersburg.

Uyezd elections took place through September to determine the electors for the Guberniya (province) assemblies. Province assemblies were the highest electoral college, and were the bodies able to elect the members of the Duma. At least 2,635 provincial electors were affiliated to government-aligned parties compared to at least 1,937 opposition aligned provincial electors. Elections to the Duma by the province assemblies took place from 14 October through to 17 October in most provinces, and later in October in the remaining ones.

== Results ==
Electoral participation sharply decreased from the previous election. Turnout for the October election in the cities was only 19% of the electorate, down by 36 percentage points from the January election. Turnout fell most sharply in the central provinces, down by 40 percentage points.

The election saw a marked shift towards the wealthy. Property owners went from making up 51 per cent of the Duma to 98 per cent, with approximately half being landlords.

Of the 51 Extreme Rightists elected, at least 32 were members of the far-right party Union of the Russian People.

Party or alliance		Seats
Union of October 17 (Octoberists)		154
Rightist fraction	Extreme Right	51
Rightist fraction	Moderate Right	70
Rightist fraction	Nationalist Group	26
Rightist fraction	Total	147
Constitutional Democratic Party (Kadets)		54
Party of Peaceful Renovation		28
Russian Social Democratic Labour Party		19
Trudovik Group		14
Polish Koło		11
Muslim Group		8
Polish–Lithuanian–Belarusian Group		7
Total		442
Source: Levin Great Russian Encyclopedia

== Aftermath ==
The government effort to create a more conservative Duma that would be less hostile to the Stolypin government proved successful.

The Octoberist Nikolay Khomyakov was elected as the new President of the Duma, a position he would hold until 1910.

Very early into the State third Duma, tensions developed within the Rightist fraction. The fraction saw ideological disputes, conduct dispute, and dispute over who the Vice President of the Duma and Assistant Secretary of the Duma. In mid-November, just after the election, the Moderate Right Fraction and Nationalist Group both split from the Rightist bloc. An unsuccessful effort was made to reunite the Rightist faction. In October 1909, the Moderate Rightists and the Nationalist Group united to form the Russian Nationalist fraction.

Also in mid-November, the Party of Peaceful Renovation formed the Fraction of the Progressists and Peaceful Renovationists, also known as the Progressive Group, with Ivan Yefryemov becoming its leader.

The Election Law 1907 officially listed 446 deputies, however the elections for the four Finnish deputies to the Duma were never to be held due to matters regarding the Grand Duchy of Finland's autonomy.

== Gallery ==
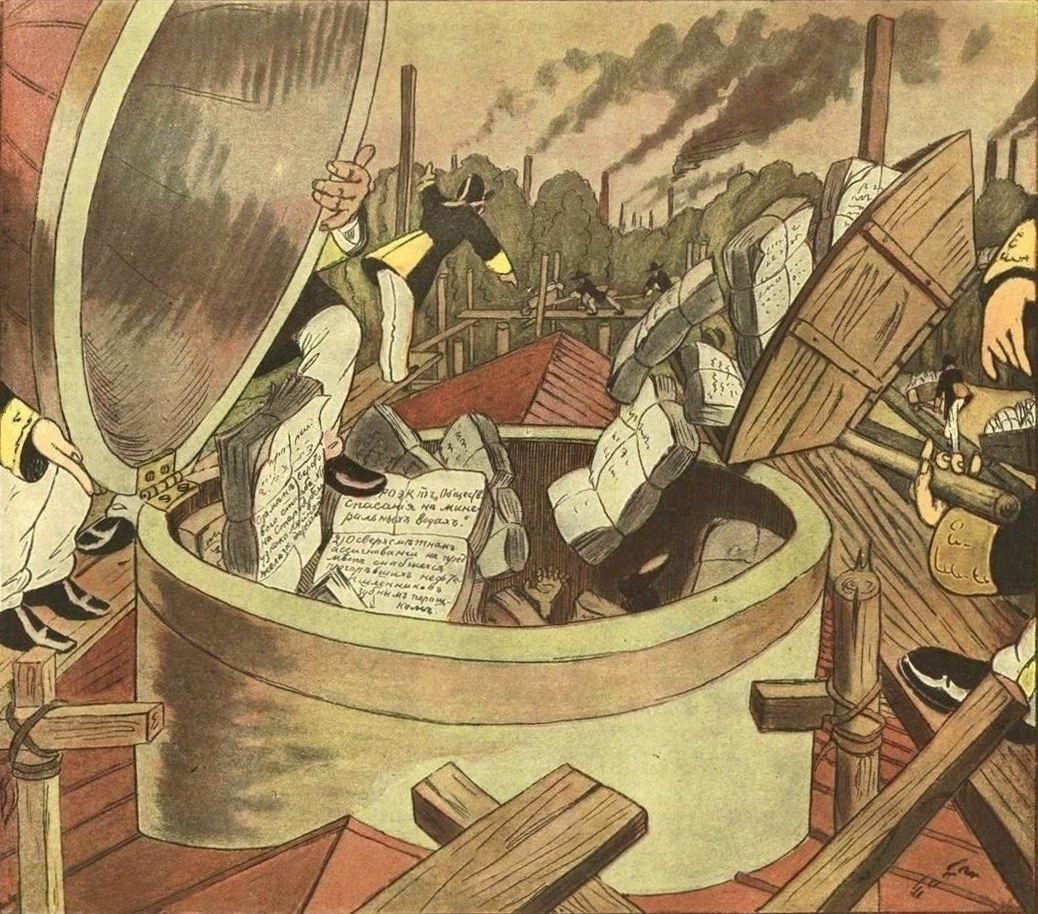
Illustrated supplement to Novoe Vremya for 19 January 1908 depicting the dome being removed to allow for bills to enter the third Duma faster

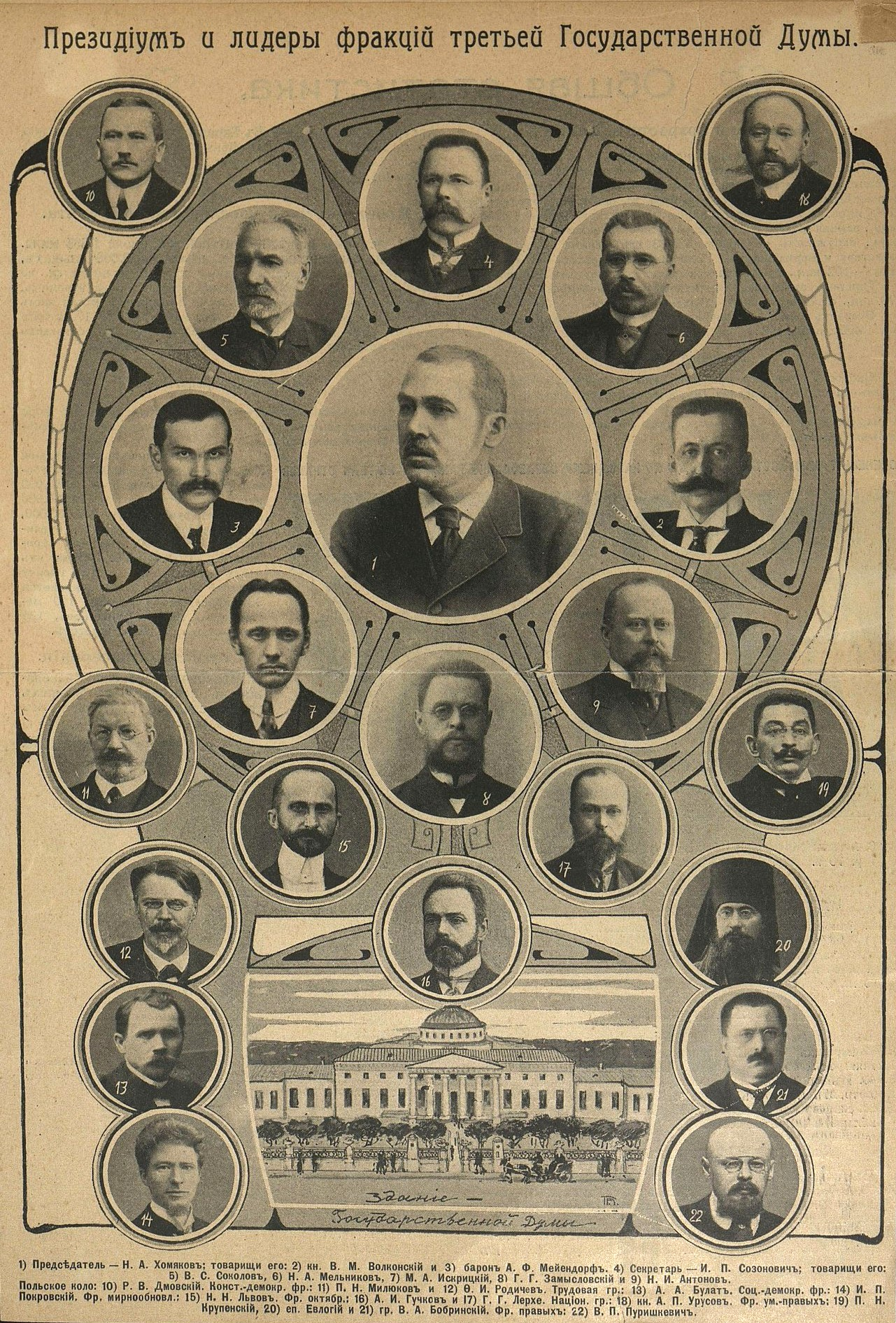
Various fraction and duma group leaders in the third State Duma, as well as the leaders of the Duma itself

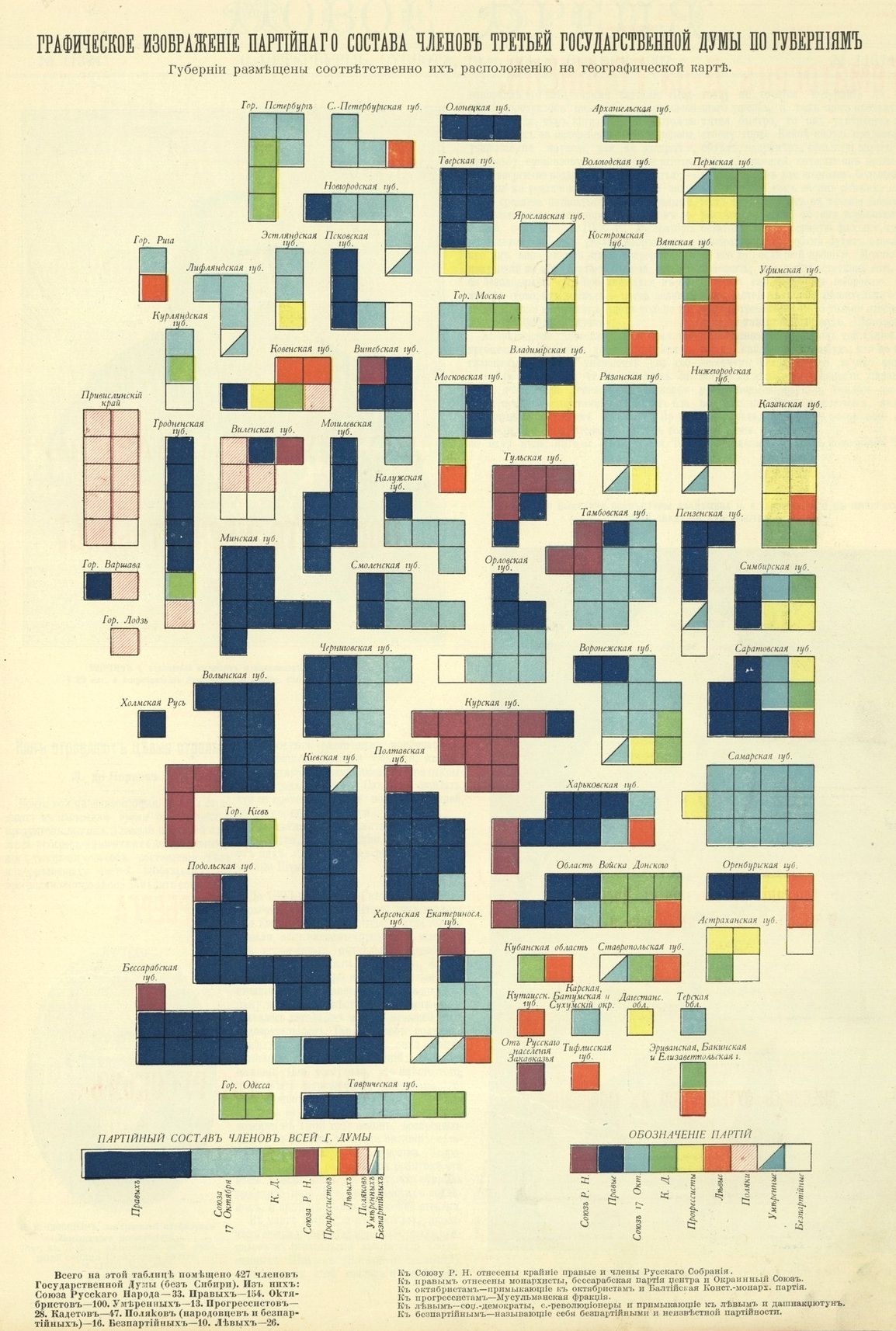
Geographic composition of the State Duma within European Russia at some point within the third State Duma

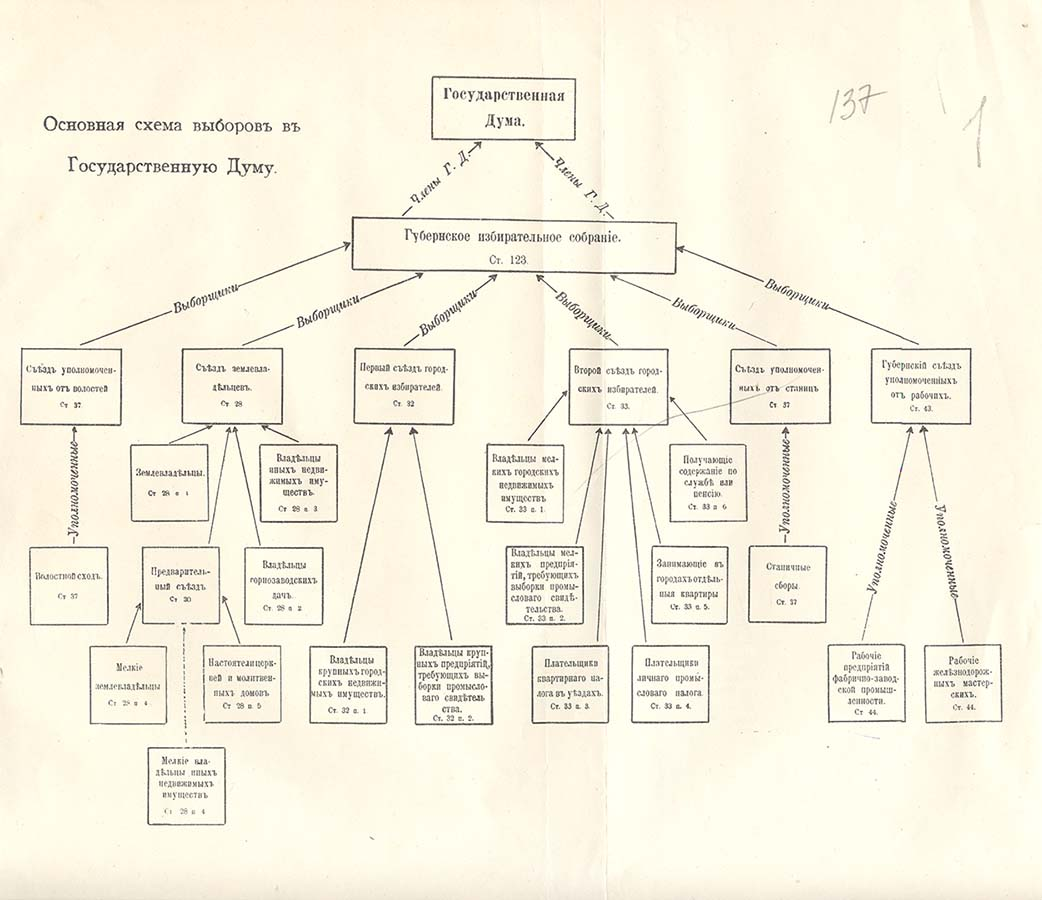
Duma diagram in Russian

== See also ==
- History of Russia (1894–1917)
- Russian Revolution of 1905
- Stolypin reforms
- Vyborg Manifesto
- October Manifesto
- Electoral college
- Zemstvo
- United Nobility
- Electoral Law 1907
- ru:Третьеиюньский переворот
