= Coup of June 1907 =

Self-coup in Russian Empire

- Part of Russian Revolution of 1905
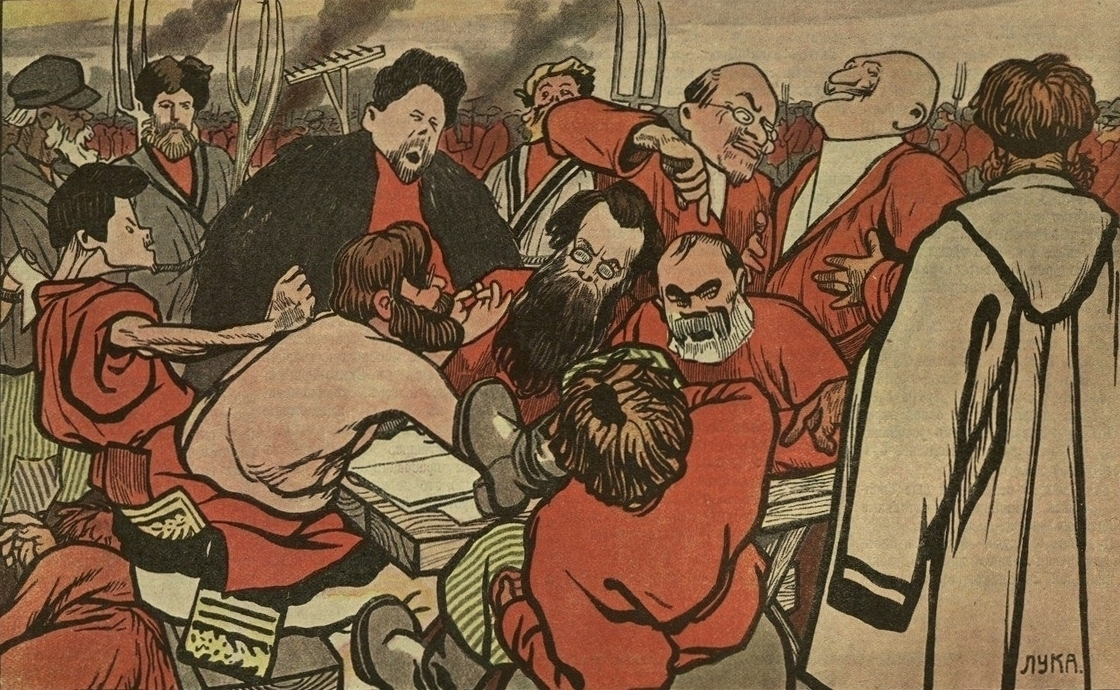
- Cartoon depicting members of the second State Duma drafting a reply to Pyotr Stolypin
- Date: 3–16 June 1907
- Location: Russian Empire
- Result: Dissolution of the 2nd Imperial Duma; Multiple deputies detained; Election Law of 1907 enacted; Pro-Government parties win the October 1907 legislative election

Parties
Pro-Government elements; Stolypin Government; United Nobility; Right-wing Zemstvos; Union of October 17; URP	Pro-Duma elements; State Duma

Lead figures
Nicholas II; Pyotr Stolypin	Fyodor Golovin

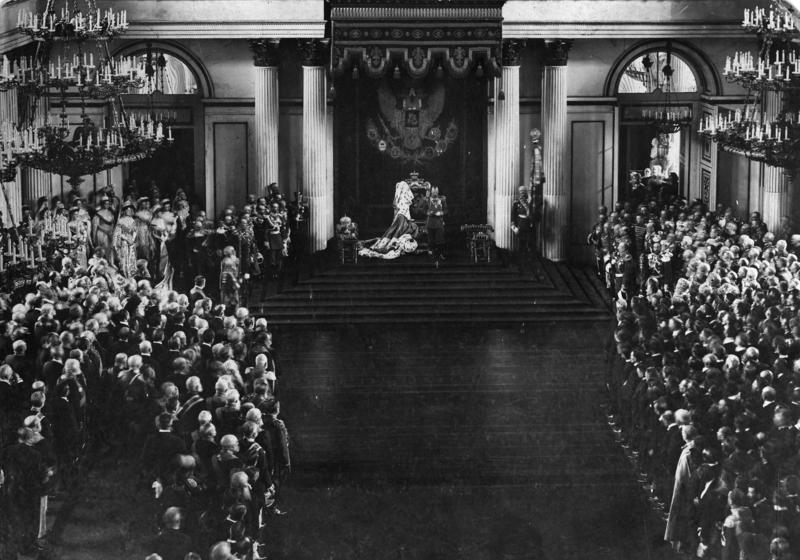
Nicholas II's opening speech before the First Duma and State Council (1906)

The Coup of June 1907, (Note: Russian: Третьеиюньский переворот, romanized: Tretyeiyunskiy perevorot, lit. 'Coup d'état of June 3rd') sometimes known as the Stolypin Coup, was a coup d'état by the cabinet of Pyotr Stolypin and Tsar Nicholas II against the State Duma of the Russian Empire. During the coup, the government dissolved the Second State Duma, arrested dozens of its members and altered the electoral laws regarding elections to the Duma.

The coup saw the government and tsar successfully shift the makeup of future Dumas in the Russian Empire; whereas previous laws had given peasants and other lower-class people a large proportion of electors to the Duma, the new electoral law increased the dominance of the propertied classes, in an effort to avoid election of the large number of liberal and revolutionary deputies who had dominated the First and Second Dumas.

This act is considered by many historians to mark the end of the Russian Revolution of 1905. Although it largely succeeded in this objective, it ultimately failed to preserve the Imperial system, which ceased to exist during the Russian Revolution of 1917.

== Background ==
During the 1905 Revolution, the autocratic regime of Nicholas II was persuaded to adopt a form of constitutionalism, in an effort to preserve itself and keep the nation from sliding into outright anarchism. Nicholas first issued what became known as the October Manifesto on 30 October [O.S. 17 October] 1905 promising basic civil rights and the creation of a parliament, without whose approval no laws were to be enacted in Russia. A new Fundamental Law was issued on 06 May [O.S. 23 April] of the following year, in which the State Duma was established as the lower chamber of a bicameral parliament (the State Council of the Russian Empire forming the upper house). This Duma thus became the first genuine attempt at parliamentary government in Russia. Whereas the Council of State was partly appointed by the Emperor and partly elected by various governmental, commercial and clerical organizations, the Duma was to be elected by Russians of various social classes through a complex system of indirect elections. Initially, the electoral system was drawn up to give a sizable number of electors to the peasants, who were seen as loyal to the Tsarist regime.

While many revolutionaries rejected the Emperor's concessions, most Russians decided to give the new system a chance. However, public faith in the new order was shaken by a fresh Manifesto, issued on 05 March [O.S. 20 February] 1906 ahead of the new Fundamental Law, which severely limited the rights of the newly constituted Duma. Since the absolute power of the Emperor did not formally end until his promulgation of the Fundamental Law itself on 06 May [O.S. 23 April] 1906, the legality of this act could not be challenged by the new legislature. Furthermore, the newly promised civil liberties—freedom of press, assembly and expression, among others—had been greatly reduced during anti-revolutionary operations in that same year.

Nicholas II opened the First Duma on 10 May [O.S. 27 April] 1906 with a speech from the throne in the Winter Palace. While he and his ministers hoped to keep the Duma quiescent, the deputies refused to cooperate: they introduced bills for agrarian reform, which were strenuously opposed by the landlords, together with other radical legislative proposals far beyond anything the Tsarist regime was prepared to accept. He dissolved the First Duma on 21 July [O.S. 8 July] 1906 but since elections for the Second Duma returned even more radicals than before, the impasse between legislature and executive continued. About 20% of seats in the Second Duma were taken by Socialists: Mensheviks, Bolsheviks (both factions of the Russian Social Democratic Labor Party), Popular Socialists and Socialist Revolutionaries, all of whom had boycotted the elections for the First Duma. Unable to build a working relationship with the new Duma, the Imperial government, under newly appointed Prime Minister Pyotr Stolypin, set about finding an excuse to dissolve it.

== Support for the Government ==
By May 1907 (but maybe earlier), the government began drawing up plans to dissolve the State Duma, and reformulate it via its election laws. The Stolypin government maintained a high level of secrecy whilst drawing up the plans.

The government had support from the Zemstvos. Many Zemstvos had already voted to exclude signatories of the Vyborg Appeal, with some calling for a restriction of the 1905 election laws. Many Zemstvos had shifted to the right at the expense of leftist elements. The Zemstvos were seen by Stolypin as a gauge of local opinion away from the capital, and as a potential source of new deputies following any changes to electoral laws.

Nobles' associations, often also being members of Zemstvos, also supported the government. Nobles were worried about revolutionary terrorism (30), and about the strong peasant presence in the State Duma. Some nobles believed the nobility at large were reacting too weakly to the formation of the Duma. At their first congress in 1906, the United Nobility declined to adopt even a statement regarding the Duma's existence. Only after the government dissolved the first Duma did the United Nobility feel confident taking a harsher position against the Duma and to change elections. The nobility criticised the duma elections for 'crowding out' nobles through permitting ethnic minorities in Russia. Specifics: The government was glad for the support of the United Nobility but was also somewhat hesitant regarding them. Following the dissolution of the first Duma, the United Nobiltiy hoped that they could come to an agreement on new electoral laws so that they could advocate for it amongst the provincial nobles and within the Zemstvos. Whilst Nobles weren't the cause or instigators for the governments plans to dismiss the duma and change electoral laws, the United Nobility becoming more vocal in its support for this did build confidence within the government.

The government was also supported by the monarchist and far-right political parties, as well organisations associated with the Black Hundreds. Among them, the most successful was Union of the Russian People. Some common programme overlap between government and far-right, such as the restriction of franchise. However the small presence within the second Duma made them less valuable allies than they could otherwise be, as well as the government being partially discouraged by their use of terrorist violence.

The Union of October 17 stance on the Stolypin government had previously been unclear, but Alexander Guchkov shifted the party to a more pro-government position by supporting Stolypin's repressions. This change in position resulted in Dmitry Shipov defecting from the party to form the Party of Peaceful Renovation. Guchkov said the Octoberists shared constitutionalism with the left whilst rejecting any revolutionary tendency, and that the Octoberists shared Russian patriotism with the right whilst rejecting unlimited autocracy. Octoberists went so far as to abandon their own plans for land reform to support the government's instead.

The government based its support from the Zemstvos, United Nobility, far-right political parties and the Octoberists. This would be the alliance to dissolve the Second Duma.

== Dissolution of the Second Duma ==
On 14 June [O.S. 1 June] 1907 Pyotr Stolypin called for a closed sitting of the Duma in which he would speak before the Duma. At 2:00 pm, Stolypin read a document before the Duma, claiming that there was a plot by the Russian Social-Democratic Labor Party (RSDLP) to establish a democratic republic.

None of the accused had been permitted to see the document prior to the sitting, and the accusations included muddled up events and information, as well as inaccurate and omitted dates. RSDLP ambitions of overthrowing the Tsarist regime and establishing a democratic republic were not secret, and were in fact frequently advertised by the party. The accusations did not however prove that the there was an immediate plan by the RSDLP to overthrow the regime, nor was there evidence linking the RSDLP Duma group to such plans.

Despite this, Stolypin demanded the Duma suspend the legal immunity of the accused deputies—the entire RSDLP Duma group. The Duma instead established a Special Committee to independently investigate the claims. The Special Committee sat all day on 15 June, and into 1:30 am on the morning of 16 June.

At 5:00 am on 16 June [O.S. 3 June], Tsar Nicholas II forcibly dissolved the State Duma by decree, calling for new elections to begin on 1 September and for the Third Duma to begin on the 1 November. The decree claimed that members of the Duma had been conspiring against the Government and the Tsar. According to the Russian Constitution of 1906, members of the Duma were not meant to be imprisoned without their legal immunity being suspended by the Duma, and being sentenced by a court. Despite this, a number of RSDLP deputies were detained and imprisoned for months without trial, and without State Duma approval.

== Electoral Law of 1907 ==
Quickly following the dissolution, the new Electoral Law 1907 was enacted by decree. Assistant Minister of the Interior Sergey Kryzhanovsky had drafted three versions of a new electoral law. The drafts had been ready long before the dissolution of the second Duma. The Council of Ministers (the government of the Russian Empire) chose the draft closest to the proposals of the United Nobility at its third conference.

Aimed to give a dominant position within the Duma to Great Russians, landowners, and the urban rich. The new law changed the proportion of electors, and reduced the amount of cities with urban direct elections (as opposed to the indirect electoral college system elsewhere) from 26 to 7. Whilist the new law was designed to not completely exclude normal people, the changes were still to further disparage peasants, workers, as well as non-Russians across the Empire, from influence within the State Duma.

In total, the Electoral Law 1907 resulted in the number of State Duma members being reduced from 524 deputies down to 442. The Stolypin government hoped that these changes would both promote a malleable duma, whilst still permitting some level of representation.

A statement from Union of October 17 recognised the new election laws had been enacted unconstitutionally, but described them as a 'regrettable necessity'. The Octoberists also believed that the new electoral laws would benefit them in the upcoming election.

== Legality and aftermath ==
The actions taken by the Tsar and the Government were of dubious legality. According to the Fundamental Laws, the Duma was not supposed to be altered without its approval. The imposed new electoral laws, coupled with the forced dissolution of the State Duma, represented a coup d'état by the Stolypin government and Nicholas II. Additionally, the charges against the RSDLP existed as little more than a pretext to the coup.

The government effort to create a more conservative Duma that would be less hostile to the Stolypin government proved successful. Pro-government parties won the October 1907 legislative election and became the largest force within the third State Duma with a total of 301—of which 154 were Octoberists, and 147 were from other pro-government parties.

Some of Nicholas II's supporters again urged him to go further than the June Coup by weakening or abolishing the Duma entirely, but once more he refused. While the Electoral Law 1907 was designed as to increase the Duma's cooperation and conservatism by empowering property owners, it resulted in a political monopoly being bestowed on the landed nobility.

== See also ==
- History of Russia (1894–1917)
- Bibliography of the Russian Revolution and Civil War
- State Council of the Russian Empire
- Stolypin reforms
- October Manifesto
- Electoral Law 1907 (on Russian Wikipedia)
- Coup of June 3 (on Russian Wikipedia)
