= History of Russia (1894–1917) =

Under Tsar Nicholas II (reigned 1894–1917), the Russian Empire slowly industrialized while repressing opposition from the center and the far-left. During the 1890s Russia's industrial development led to a large increase in the size of the urban middle class and of the working class, which gave rise to a more dynamic political atmosphere. Because the state and foreigners owned much of Russia's industry, the Russian working class was comparatively stronger and the Russian bourgeoisie comparatively weaker than in the West.

During the 1890s and early 1900s, bad living- and working-conditions, high taxes, and land hunger gave rise to more frequent strikes and agrarian disorders. By 1914, 40% of Russian workers were employed in factories of 1,000 workers or more (32% in 1901). 42% worked in businesses of 100 to 1,000 workers and 18% in businesses of 100 workers or fewer (in 1914, the United States had equivalent figures of 18%, 47% and 35%, respectively).

Politically, anti-establishment forces organized into competing parties, although political parties were not legalized until the October Manifesto was issued in 1905. The liberal elements among the industrial capitalists and nobility, who believed in peaceful social reform and a constitutional monarch, founded the Constitutional Democratic party or Kadets in 1905. The socialist parties included the Socialist Revolutionaries (SRs, founded in 1900) and the Russian Social Democratic Workers Party (RSDRP, founded in 1898). The workers in major cities revolted in 1905 with widespread strikes and mutinies. The Tsar barely kept control, and was forced to initiate reforms, promising an elective parliament (the Duma) in the October Manifesto. However, the Tsar then dissolved the Duma in 1906. He turned to Peter Stolypin (Prime Minister from 1906 to 1911) to help reform the huge, but sluggish, economy.

Nicholas II's foreign policy centred on an alliance with France and involved increased meddling in Balkan affairs. Russia proclaimed a role for itself as military protector of Orthodox Christians, notably those in Serbia. Efforts to expand Russian power in the Far East led to a short war with Japan in 1904–1905, which ended in humiliating defeat for St Petersburg. The Russians entered into World War I in 1914, but military losses and the pressures of a failing war-time economy led liberal elements to conduct the February Revolution in 1917 as radicals like Vladimir Lenin unionized to launch a coup, largely working through soviets in the factories and in the army. Deciding that it could not continue the war and hold onto its revolutionary gains, the new Soviet government made a separate peace with Germany, signing away 150,000km^{2} of Russian land in the Treaty of Breast-Litovsk.

== Alliance with France, 1894–1914 ==
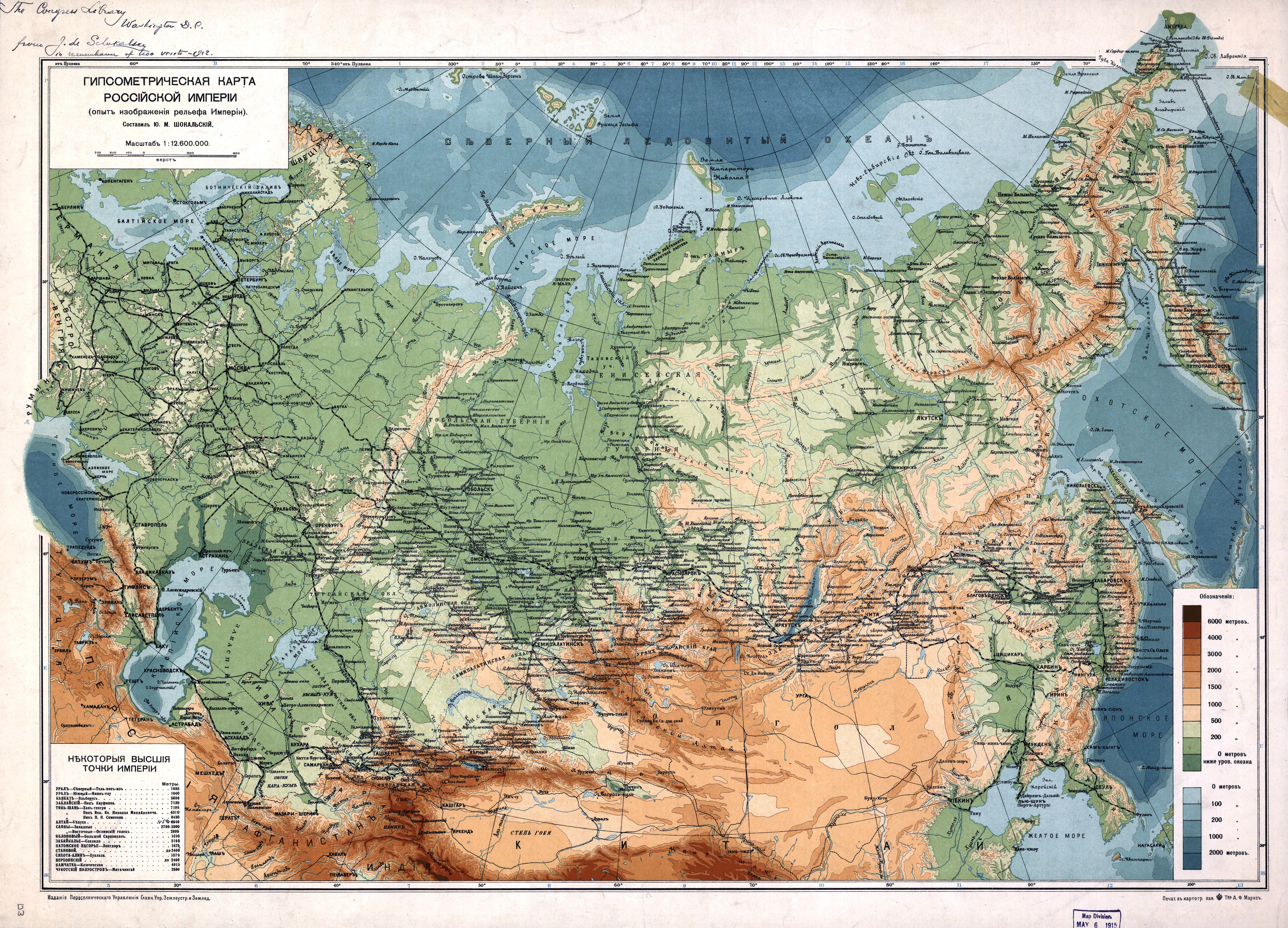
Russia in 1914

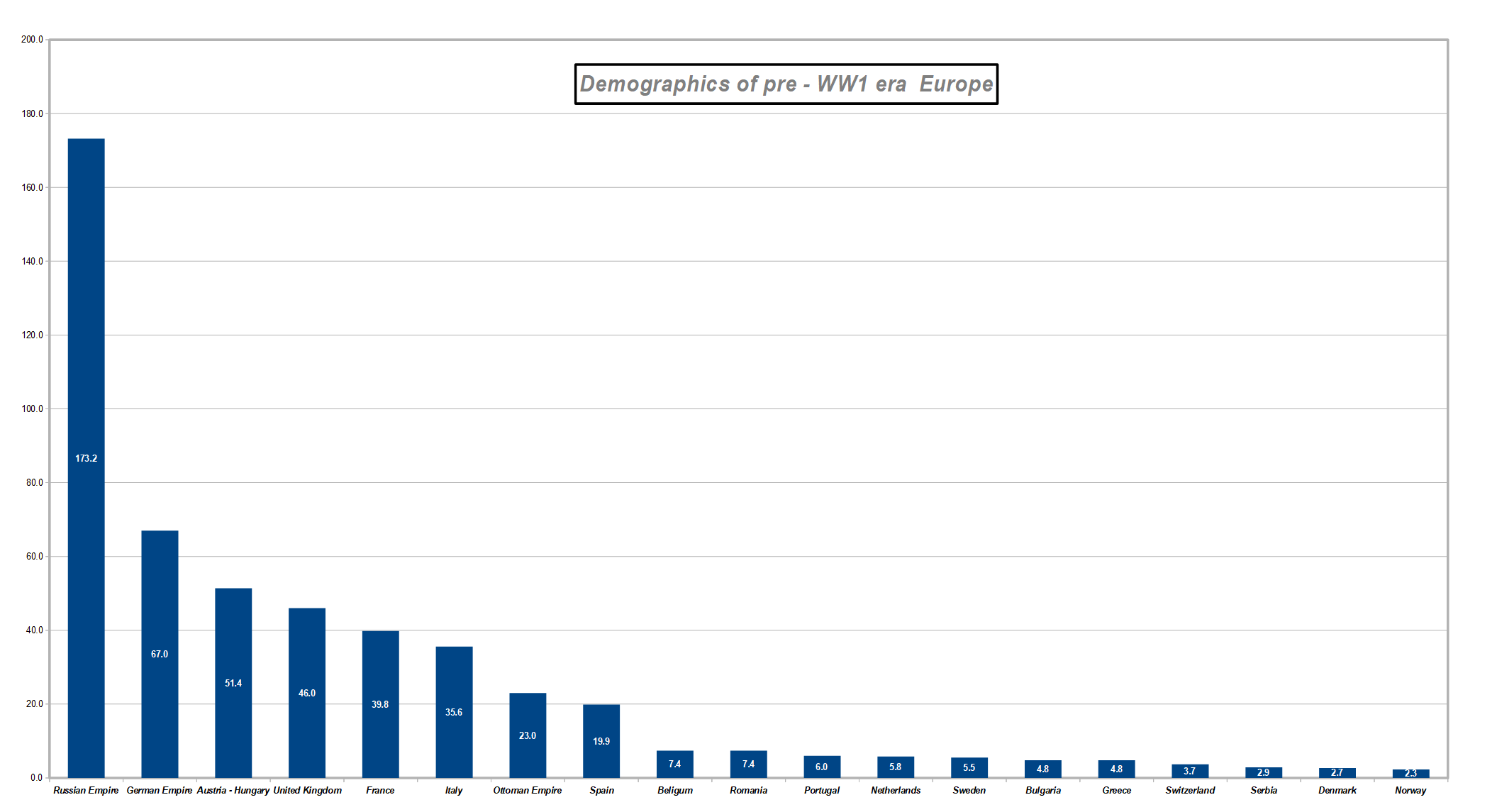
Demographics of pre-WW1 European countries

The central development in Russian foreign policy was to move away from Germany and toward France. Russia had never been friendly with France, and remembered the wars in the Crimean and the Napoleonic invasion; it saw Paris as a dangerous front of subversion and ridiculed the weak governments there. France, which had been shut out of the entire alliance system by Bismarck, decided to improve relations with Russia. It lent money to the Russians, expanded trade, and began selling warships after 1890. Meanwhile, after Bismarck lost office in 1890, there was no renewal of the Reinsurance treaty between Russia and Germany. The German bankers stopped lending to Russia, which increasingly depended on Paris banks. In 1894 a secret treaty stipulated that Russia would come to the aid of France if France was attacked by Germany. Another stipulation was that in a possible war against Germany, France would immediately mobilize 1.3 million men, while Russia would mobilize 700,000 to 800,000. It provided that if any one or more of the Triple Alliance (Germany, Austria, Italy) mobilized their reserves in preparation for war, then both Russia and France would mobilize theirs. "The mobilization is the declaration of war," the French chief of staff told Tsar Alexander III in 1892. "To mobilize is to oblige one's neighbor to do the same." This set up the tripwire for July 1914. George F. Kennan argues that Russia was primarily responsible for the collapse of Bismarck's alliance policy in Europe, and starting the downward slope to the First World War. Kennan blames poor Russian diplomacy centered on its ambitions in the Balkans. Kennan says Bismarck's foreign policy was designed to prevent any major war even in the face of improved Franco-Russian relations. Russia left Bismarck's Three Emperors' League (with Germany and Austria) and instead took up the French proposal for closer relationships and a military alliance.

== Imperialism in Asia and the Russo-Japanese War ==
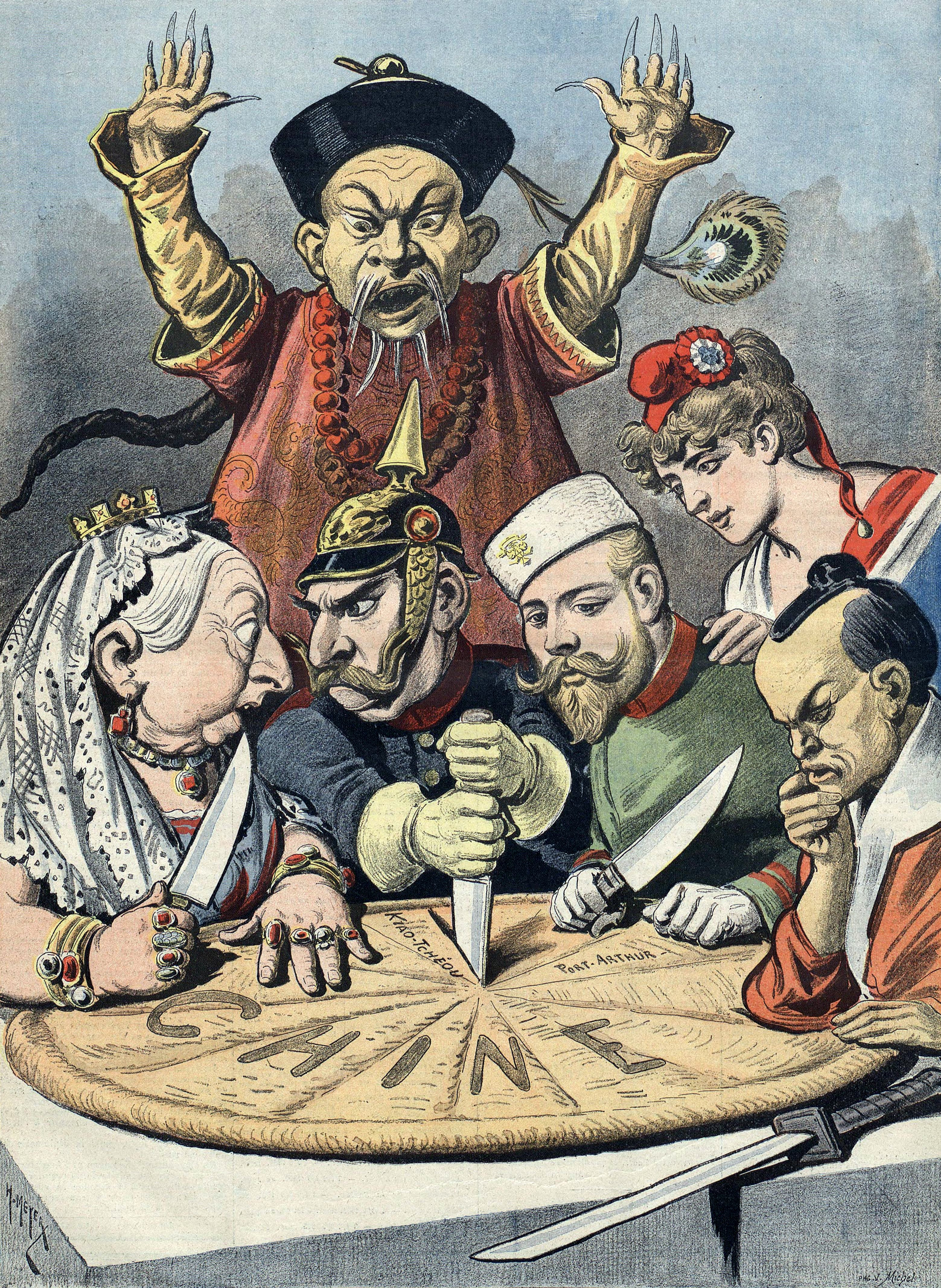
A French cartoon depicting a stereotypical mandarin in Manchu robe as Queen Victoria (Great Britain), Kaiser Wilhelm II (Germany), Tsar Nicholas II (Russia), and a samurai (Japan) cut into a king cake inscribed with the word Chine (China). France is represented as Marianne, with a hand on the shoulder of Nicholas II, suggesting the Franco-Russian Alliance

Russia gained room to maneuver in Asia because of its friendship with France and the growing rivalry between Britain and Germany. By 1895 Germany was competing with France for Russia's favour, and British statesmen hoped to negotiate with the Russians to demarcate spheres of influence in Asia. This situation enabled Russia to intervene in northeastern Asia after Japan's victory over China in 1895. In the negotiations that followed, Japan was forced to make concessions in the Liaotung Peninsula and Port Arthur in southern Manchuria. The next year, Sergei Witte used French capital to establish the Russo-Chinese Bank. The goal of the bank was to finance the construction of a railroad across northern Manchuria and thus shorten the Trans-Siberian Railway. Within two years, Russia had acquired leases on the Liaotung Peninsula and Port Arthur and had begun building a trunk line from Harbin in central Manchuria to Port Arthur on the coast. At the same time Great Britain occupied Wei-Hai-Wei, and Germany Kiaochao.

In 1900, China reacted to foreign encroachments on its territory with an armed popular uprising, the Boxer Rebellion. Russian military contingents joined forces from Europe, Japan, and the United States to restore order in northern China. A force of 150,000 Russian troops occupied Manchuria to secure its railroads. After the suppression of the rebellion, Russia did not withdraw its troops from Manchuria. Consequently, friction grew between Russia and Japan, and the latter opened hostilities at Port Arthur in January 1904, without any formal declaration of war.

In counterpoint to the Japanese strategy of gaining rapid victories to control Manchuria, Russian strategy focused on fighting delaying actions to gain time for reinforcements to arrive via the long Trans-Siberian railway. In January 1905, after several unsuccessful attacks which cost them 60,000 troops killed and wounded and an eight-month siege, the Japanese captured Port Arthur. In March, the Japanese forced the Russians to withdraw north of Mukden, but were unable to pursue the Russians because Japanese troops suffered heavy casualties. Because strategically the possession of the city meant little, the final victory was dependent on the navy. In May, at the Tsushima Straits, the Japanese destroyed Russia's last hope in the war, a fleet assembled from the navy's Baltic and Mediterranean squadrons. Theoretically, Russian army reinforcements could have driven the Japanese from the Asian mainland, but revolution at home and diplomatic pressure forced the tsar to seek peace. Russia accepted mediation by United States president Theodore Roosevelt, ceded southern Sakhalin Island to Japan, and acknowledged Japan's ascendancy in Korea and southern Manchuria.

== Influence of agriculture ==
Russia's systems for agricultural production influenced the attitudes of peasants and other social groups to reform against the government and promote social changes. “At the beginning of the twentieth century, agriculture constituted the single largest sector of the Russian economy, producing approximately one-half of the national income and employing two-thirds of Russia’s population”. This illustrates the tremendous role peasants played economically; thus making them detrimental to the revolutionary ideology of the populist and social democrats. At the end of the 19th century, Russian agriculture as a whole was the worst in Europe. The Russian system of agriculture lacked capital investment and technological advancement. Livestock productivity was notoriously backwards and the lack of grazing land such as meadows forced livestock to graze in fallow uncultivated land. Both the crop and livestock system failed to be adequate to withstand the Russian winters. During the Tsarist rule, the agricultural economy diverged from subsistence production to production directly for the market. Along with the agricultural failures, Russia had a rapid population growth, railroads expanded across farmland, and inflation attacked the price of commodities. Restrictions were placed on the distribution of food and ultimately lead to famines. Agricultural difficulties in Russia limited the economy, influencing social reforms and assisting the rise of the Bolshevik party.

== Revolution and counterrevolution, 1905–1907 ==
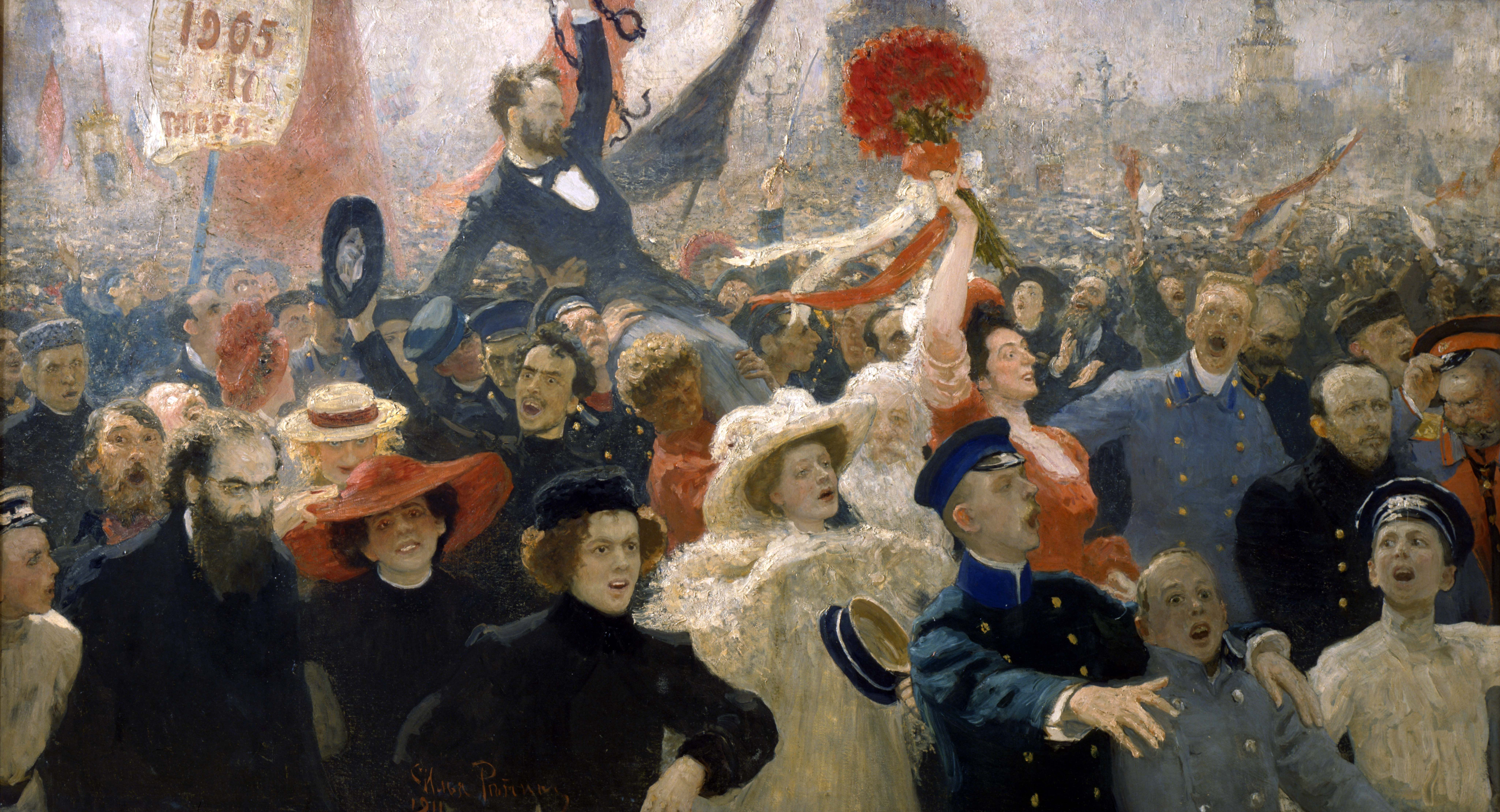
Ilya Repin, 17 October 1905

The Russo-Japanese War accelerated the rise of political movements among all classes and the major nationalities, including propertied Russians. By early 1904, Russian liberal activists from the zemstva and from the professions had formed an organization called the Union of Liberation. In the same year, they joined with Finns, Poles, Georgians, Armenians, and Russian members of the Socialist-Revolutionary Party to form an alliance against autocratic rule.

The revolution of 1905, an unprecedented empire-wide social and political upheaval, was set in motion by the violent suppression on January 22 (Bloody Sunday) in St. Petersburg of a mass procession of workers, led by the radical priest Georgiy Gapon, with a petition for the tsar. Bloody Sunday was followed, nationwide, by workers’ and students’ strikes, street demonstrations, spates of vandalism and other periodic violence, assassinations of government officials, naval mutinies, nationalist movements in the imperial borderlands, and anti-Jewish pogroms and other reactionary protest and violence. In a number of cities, workers formed Soviets, or councils. At the end of the year, armed uprisings occurred in Moscow, the Urals, Latvia, and parts of Poland. Activists from the zemstva and the broad professional Union of Unions formed the Constitutional Democratic Party, whose initials lent the party its informal name, the Kadets. Some upper-class and propertied activists called for compromise with opposition groups to avoid further disorders.

The outcome of the revolution was contradictory. In late 1905, Nicholas agreed, somewhat reluctantly, to issue the so-called October Manifesto, which promised Russia a reformed political order and basic civil liberties for most citizens. New fundamental laws in 1906 established the legislative State Duma, or parliament, but also restricted its authority in many ways — not least of which was the complete lack of parliamentary control over the appointment or dismissal of cabinet ministers. Trade unions and strikes were legalised, but police retained extensive authority to monitor union activities and to close unions for engaging in illegal political activities. Press freedom was guaranteed.

Those who accepted the new arrangements formed a center-right political party, the Octobrists. Meanwhile, the Kadets held out for a truly responsible ministerial government and equal, universal suffrage. Because of their political principles and continued armed uprisings, Russia's leftist parties were undecided whether to participate in the Duma elections, which had been called for early 1906. At the same time, rightist factions actively opposed the reforms. Several new monarchist and protofascist groups also arose to subvert the new order. Nevertheless, the regime continued to function through the chaotic year of 1905, eventually restoring order in the cities, the countryside, and the army. In the process, terrorists murdered hundreds of officials, and the government executed much greater number of terrorists. Because the government had been able to restore order and to secure a loan from France before the first Duma met, Nicholas was in a strong position that enabled him to replace Witte with the much more conservative Pyotr Stolypin.

The First Duma was elected in March 1906. The Kadets and their allies dominated it, with the mainly nonparty radical leftists slightly weaker than the Octobrists and the nonparty center-rightists combined. The socialists had boycotted the election, but several socialist delegates were elected. Relations between the Duma and the Stolypin government were hostile from the beginning. A deadlock of the Kadets and the government over the adoption of a constitution and peasant reform led to the dissolution of the Duma and the scheduling of new elections. In spite of an upsurge of leftist terror, radical leftist parties participated in the election, and, together with the nonparty left, they gained a plurality of seats, followed by a loose coalition of Kadets with Poles and other nationalities in the political center. The impasse continued, however, when the Second Duma met in 1907.

== Stolypin and Kokovtsov governments ==
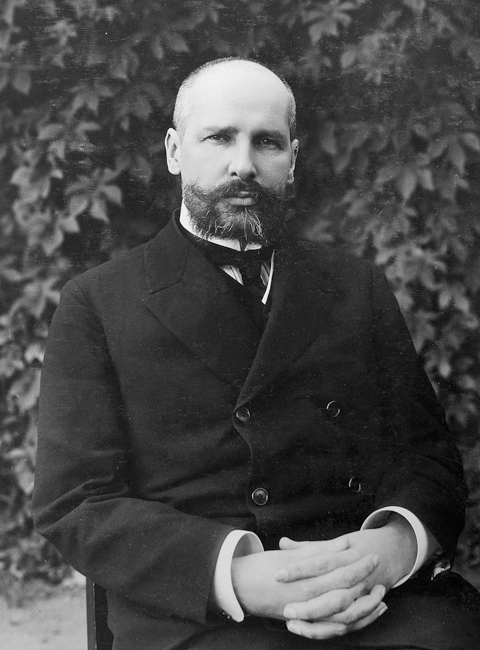
Pyotr Stolypin

In June 1907, The Tsar dissolved the Second Duma and promulgated a new electoral law, which vastly reduced the electoral weight of lower-class and non-Russian voters and increased the weight of the nobility. This political coup (Coup of June 1907) had the desired short-term result of restoring order. New elections in the autumn returned a more conservative Third Duma, which Octobrists dominated. Even this Duma quarreled with the government over a variety of issues, however, including the composition of the naval staff, the autonomous status of Finland, the introduction of zemstva in the western provinces, the reform of the peasant court system, and the establishment of workers' insurance organizations under police supervision. In these disputes, the Duma, with its appointed aristocratic-bureaucratic upper house, was sometimes more conservative than the government, and at other times it was more constitutionally minded. The Fourth Duma, elected in 1912, was similar in composition to the third, but a progressive faction of Octobrists split from the right and joined the political center.

Stolypin's boldest measure was his peasant reform program. It allowed, and sometimes forced, the breakup of communes as well as the establishment of full private property. Stolypin hoped that the reform program would create a class of conservative landowning farmers loyal to the Tsar. Most peasants did not want to lose the safety of the commune or to permit outsiders to buy village land, however. By 1914 only about 10 percent of all peasant communes had been dissolved. Nevertheless, the economy recovered and grew impressively from 1907 to 1914, both quantitatively and through the formation of rural cooperatives and banks and the generation of domestic capital. By 1914 Russian steel production equaled that of France and Austria-Hungary, and Russia's economic growth rate was one of the highest in the world. Although external debt was very high, it was declining as a percentage of the gross national product, and the empire's overall trade balance was favorable.

In 1911 Stolypin was assassinated by Dmitry Bogrov whilst watching an opera. Finance Minister Vladimir Kokovtsov replaced him. The cautious Kokovtsov was very able and a supporter of the tsar, but he could not compete with the powerful court factions that dominated the government.

Historians have debated whether Russia had the potential to develop a constitutional government between 1905 and 1914. The failure to do so was partly because the tsar was not willing to give up autocratic rule or share power. By manipulating the franchise, the government obtained progressively more conservative, but less representative, Dumas. Moreover, the regime sometimes bypassed the conservative Dumas and ruled by decree.

== Active Balkan policy, 1906–1913 ==
Russia's earlier Far Eastern policy required holding Balkan issues in abeyance, a strategy Austria-Hungary also followed between 1897 and 1906. Japan's victory in 1905 had forced Russia to make deals with the British and the Japanese. In 1907 Russia's new foreign minister, Aleksandr Izvol'skiy, concluded agreements with both nations. To maintain its sphere of influence in northern Manchuria and northern Persia, Russia agreed to Japanese ascendancy in southern Manchuria and Korea, and to British ascendancy in southern Persia, Afghanistan, and Tibet. The logic of this policy demanded that Russia and Japan unite to prevent the United States from establishing a base in China by organizing a consortium to develop Chinese railroads. After China's republican revolution of 1911, Russia and Japan recognized each other's spheres of influence in Inner Mongolia. In an extension of this reasoning, Russia traded recognition of German economic interests in the Ottoman Empire and Persia for German recognition of various Russian security interests in the region. Russia also protected its strategic and financial position by entering the informal Triple Entente with Britain and France, without antagonizing Germany.

In spite of these careful measures, after the Russo-Japanese War Russia and Austria-Hungary resumed their Balkan rivalry, focusing on the Kingdom of Serbia and the provinces of Bosnia and Herzegovina, which Austria-Hungary had occupied since 1878. In 1881 Russia secretly had agreed in principle to Austria's future annexation of Bosnia and Herzegovina. But in 1908, Izvol'skiy consented to support formal annexation in return for Austria's support for revision of the agreement on the neutrality of the Bosporus and Dardanelles—a change that would give Russia special navigational rights of passage. Britain stymied the Russian gambit by blocking the revision, but Austria proceeded with the annexation. Then, backed by German threats of war, Austria-Hungary exposed Russia's weakness by forcing Russia to disavow support for Serbia.

After Austria-Hungary's annexation of Bosnia and Herzegovina, Russia became a major part of the increased tension and conflict in the Balkans. In 1912 Bulgaria, Serbia, Greece, and Montenegro defeated the Ottoman Empire in the First Balkan War, but the putative allies continued to quarrel among themselves. Then in 1913, the alliance split, and the Serbs, Greeks, and Romanians defeated Bulgaria in the Second Balkan War. Austria-Hungary became the patron of Bulgaria, which now was Serbia's territorial rival in the region, and Germany remained the Ottoman Empire's protector. Russia tied itself more closely to Serbia than it had previously. The complex system of alliances and Great Power support was extremely unstable; among the Balkan parties harboring resentments over past defeats, the Serbs maintained particular animosity toward the Austro-Hungarian annexation of Bosnia and Herzegovina.

In June 1914, a Serbian student Gavrilo Princip assassinated Archduke Franz Ferdinand, heir to the throne of Austria-Hungary, which then held the Serbian government responsible. Austria-Hungary delivered an ultimatum to Serbia. Serbia submitted to the first 2 of 3 cases of the ultimatum; the last one, which was rejected, demanded Serbia allow 100,000 Austrio-Hungarian troops to occupy their country. After Serbian rejection of the third clause of the ultimatum, Austria-Hungary responded forcefully. Russia supported Serbia. Once the Serbian response was rejected, the system of alliances began to operate automatically, with Germany supporting Austria-Hungary and France backing Russia. When Germany invaded France through Belgium as dictated by the Schliffen Plan, the conflict escalated into a world war and they were not prepared.

== Russia at war, 1914–1916 ==
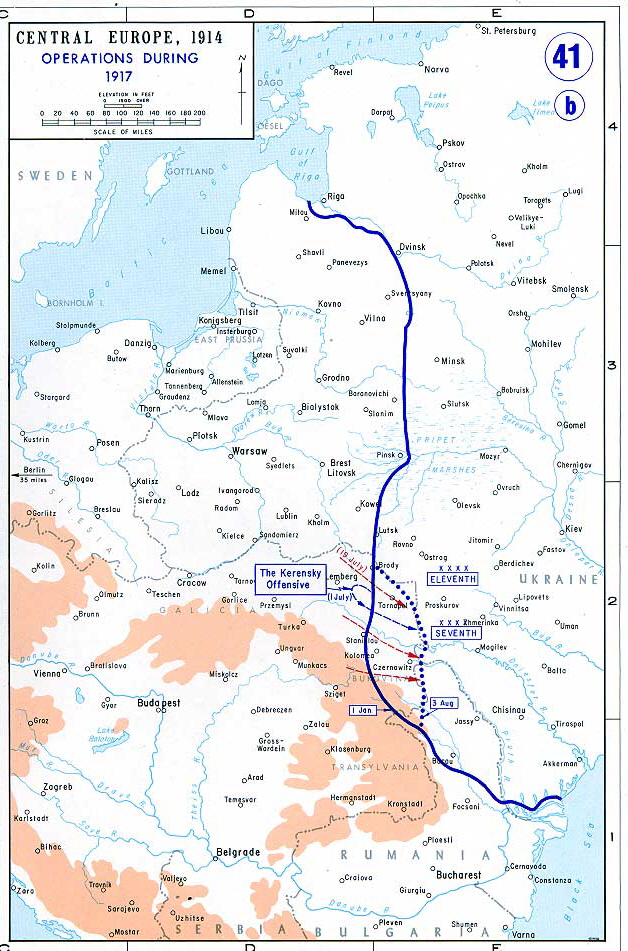
The Eastern Front in 1917

At the outbreak of the war, Tsar Nicholas yielded to pressure and appointed Grand Duke Nicholas as commander in chief of the Russian armies. The Grand Duke, a cousin of the tsar, was competent but had no part in formulating the strategy or appointing commanders.

In the initial phase of the war, Russia's offensives into East Prussia drew enough German troops from the western front to allow the French, Belgians, and British to stop the German advance. One of Russia's two invading armies was almost totally destroyed, however, at the disastrous Battle of Tannenberg—the same site at which Lithuanian, Polish, and Moldovan troops had defeated the German Teutonic Knights in 1410. Meanwhile, the Russians turned back an Austrian offensive and pushed into eastern Galicia, the northeastern region of the Austro-Hungarian Empire. The Russians halted a combined German-Austrian winter counteroffensive into Russian Poland, and in early 1915 they pushed more deeply into Galicia. Then in the spring and summer of that year, a German-Austrian offensive drove the Russians out of Galicia and Poland and destroyed several Russian army corps. In 1916 the Germans planned to drive France out of the war with a large-scale attack in the Verdun area, but a new Russian offensive against Austria-Hungary once again drew German troops from the west. These actions left both major fronts stable and both Russia and Germany despairing of victory—Russia because of exhaustion, Germany because of its opponents' superior resources. Toward the end of 1916, Russia came to the rescue of Romania, which had just entered the war, and extended the eastern front south to the Black Sea.

Wartime agreements among the Allies reflected the Triple Entente's imperialist aims and the Russian Empire's relative weakness outside Eastern Europe. Russia nonetheless expected impressive gains from a victory: territorial acquisitions in eastern Galicia from Austria, in East Prussia from Germany, and northeastern Anatolia from the Ottoman Empire, which joined the war on the German side; control of Constantinople and the Bosporus and Dardanelles straits; and territorial and political alteration of Austria-Hungary in the interests of Romania and the Slavic peoples of the region. Britain was to acquire the middle zone of Persia and share much of the Arab Middle East with France; Italy—not Russia's ally Serbia—was to acquire Dalmatia along the Adriatic coast; Japan, another ally of the Entente, was to control more territory in China; and France was to regain Alsace-Lorraine, which it had lost to Germany in the Franco-Prussian War, and to have increased influence in western Germany.

== Fatal weakening of the tsardom ==
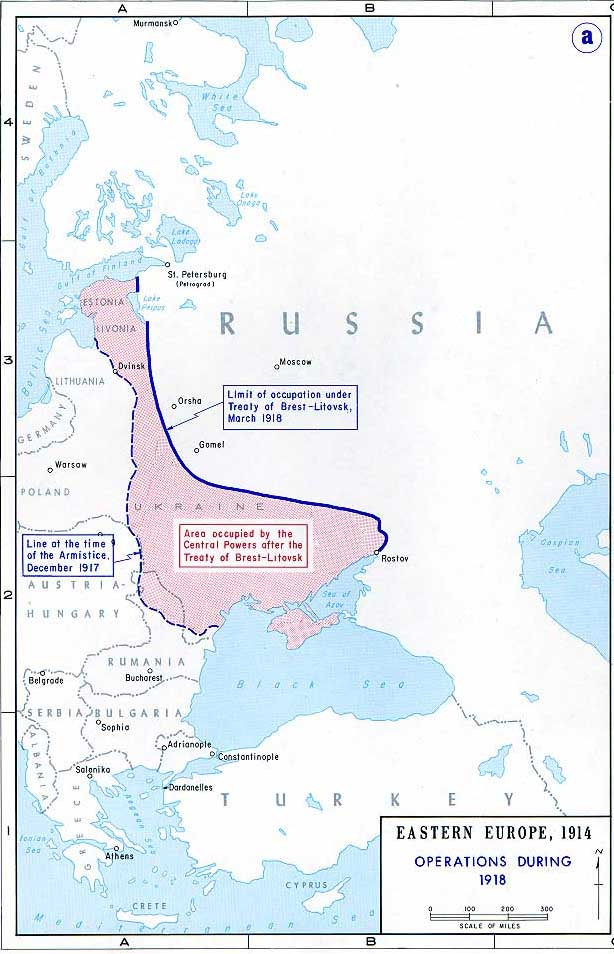
Territory lost under the Treaty of Brest-Litovsk

The onset of World War I exposed the weakness of Nicholas II's government. A show of national unity had accompanied Russia's entrance into the war, with defense of the Slavic Serbs the main battle cry. In the summer of 1914, the Duma and the zemstva expressed full support for the government's war effort. The initial conscription was well organized and peaceful, and the early phase of Russia's military buildup showed that the empire had learned lessons from the Russo-Japanese War. But military reversals and the government's incompetence soon soured much of the population. German control of the Baltic Sea and German-Ottoman control of the Black Sea severed Russia from most of its foreign supplies and potential markets. In addition, inept Russian preparations for war and ineffective economic policies hurt the country financially, logistically, and militarily. Inflation became a serious problem. Because of inadequate material support for military operations, the War Industry Committees were formed to ensure that necessary supplies reached the front. But army officers quarreled with civilian leaders, seized administrative control of front areas, and refused to cooperate with the committee. The central government distrusted the independent war support activities that were organized by zemstva and cities. The Duma quarreled with the war bureaucracy of the government, and center and center-left deputies eventually formed the Progressive Bloc to create a genuinely constitutional government.

After Russian military reversals in 1915, Nicholas II went to the front to assume nominal leadership of the army, leaving behind his German-born wife, Alexandra, government and Duma.

While the central government was hampered by court intrigue, the strain of the war began to cause popular unrest. Since 1915 high food prices and fuel shortages caused strikes in some cities. Workers, who had won the right to representation in sections of the War Industries Committee, used those sections as organs of political opposition. The countryside also was becoming restive. Soldiers were increasingly insubordinate, particularly the newly recruited peasants who faced the prospect of being used as cannon fodder in the inept conduct of the war.

The situation continued to deteriorate. Increasing conflict between the tsar and the Duma weakened both parts of the government and increased the impression of incompetence. In early 1917, deteriorating rail transport caused acute food and fuel shortages, which resulted in riots and strikes. Authorities summoned troops to quell the disorders in Petrograd (as St. Petersburg had been called since September 1914, to Russianize the Germanic name). In 1905 troops had fired on demonstrators and saved the monarchy, but in 1917 the troops turned their guns over to the angry crowds. Public support for the tsarist regime simply evaporated in 1917, ending three centuries of Romanov rule.

== Sources ==
- The first draft of this article was taken with little editing from the Library of Congress Federal Research Division's Country Studies series. As their home page at http://lcweb2.loc.gov/frd/cs/cshome.html says, "Information contained in the Country Studies On-Line is not copyrighted and thus is available for free and unrestricted use by researchers. As a courtesy, however, appropriate credit should be given to the series." Please leave this statement intact so that credit can be given.
