= Party of Peaceful Renovation =

Defunct political party in Russia

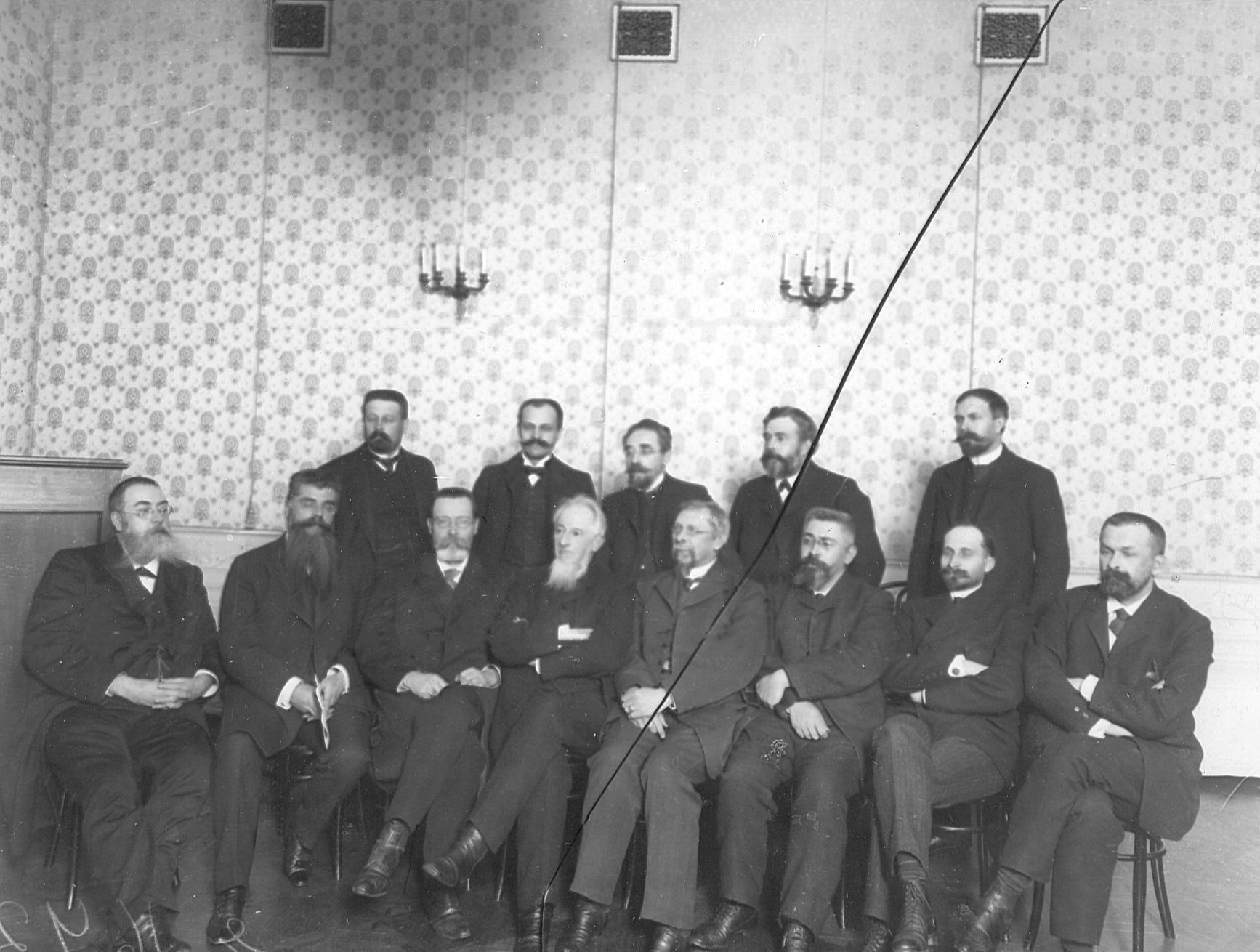
Central Committee of the Party of Peaceful Renovation.

The Party of Peaceful Renovation (Russian: Партия мирного обновления) was a liberal political organisation in the Russian Empire, based amongst landlords and the bourgeoisie.

In September 1906, liberal members of the Union of October 17 party split off to found the Party of Peaceful Renovation due to the Octoberists support of repression. The party was initially led by Pyotr Heiden, and was quickly followed by Dmitry Shipov after Heiden's death. Other influential founding figures included N. N. Lvov, P. P. Ryabushinsky, Mikhail Stakhovich, prince Evgenii N. Trubetskoy and his brother Grigory Nikolaevich Trubetskoy.

In contrast to the Octoberists, the Peaceful Renovationists took a critical opinion of the June Coup, the repeated dissolutions of the Duma, and the Stolypin government. The Peaceful Renovationists also argued for cooperation with the Octoberists and the Kadets, so as to strengthen Russian constitutionalism.

After the October 1907 Russian legislative election, the Peaceful Renovationists formed the Progressive Group.

== See also ==
- Progressive Party
