= Mikhail Stakhovich =

Russian politician (1861–1923)

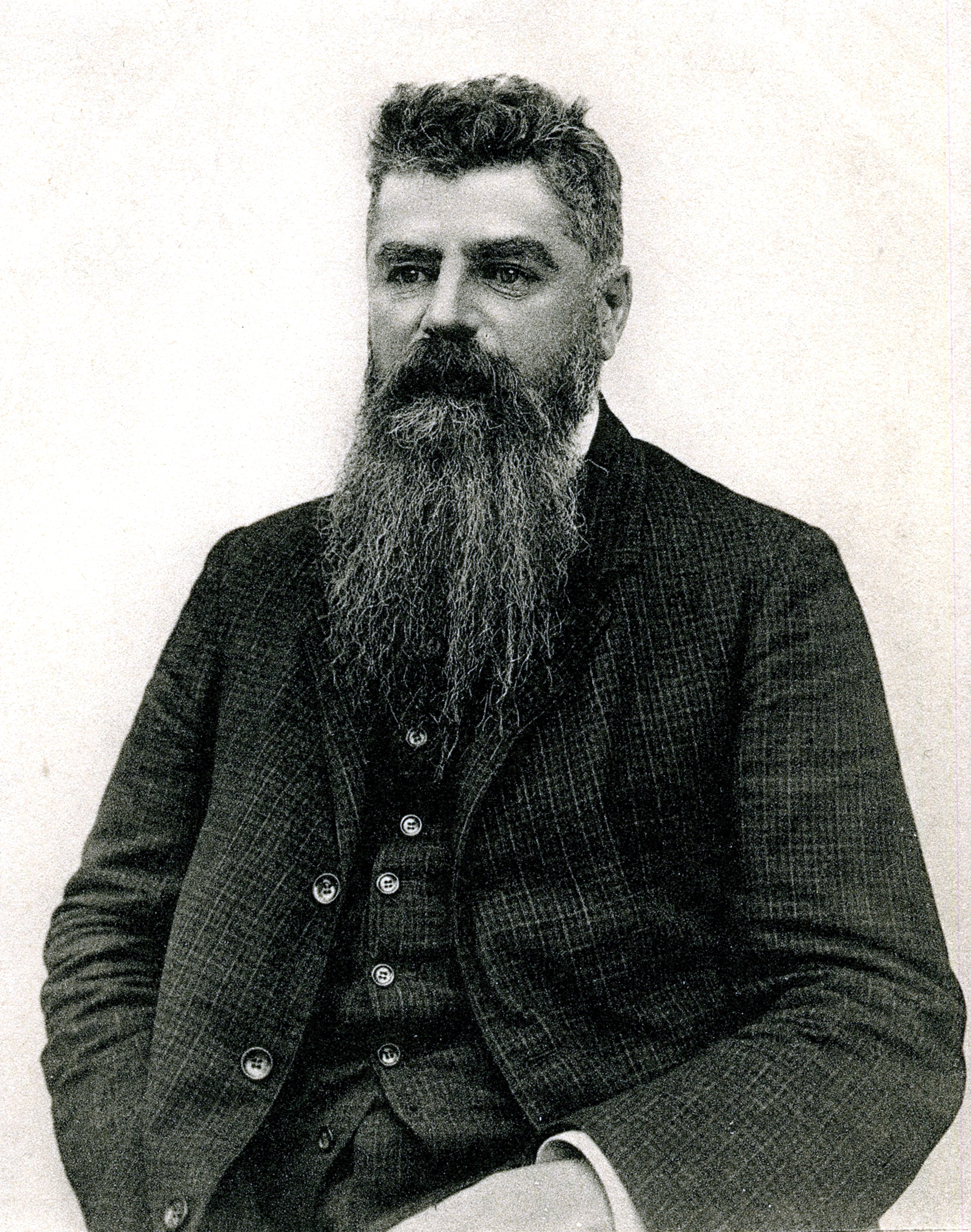

18th Governor-General of Grand Duchy of Finland
- In office 20 March 1917 – 17 September 1917
- Minister-Chairman: Georgy Lvov
- Preceded by: Franz Albert Seyn
- Succeeded by: Nikolai Vissarionovich Nekrasov

Personal details
- Born: Mikhail Aleksandrovich Stakhovich; 8 January 1861 Yeletsky Uyezd, Oryol Governorate
- Died: 23 September 1923 (aged 62) Aix-en-Provence, Bouches-du-Rhône, France
- Occupation: Member of the State Duma of the Russian Empire

Mikhail Aleksandrovich Stakhovich (Russian: Михаи́л Алекса́ндрович Стахо́вич; 20 January 1861, in Oryol Governorate – 23 September 1923, in Aix-en-Provence) was a Russian politician.

Stakhovich was elected to the Duma in 1906 as an Octobrist and again to the second Duma in 1907, leading the Party of Peaceful Renovation.

He was appointed Governor-General of Finland by the Russian Provisional Government on 20 March 1917 after the job was refused by Vladimir Dmitrievich Nabokov amongst others. He resigned on 17 September.

After the Governor-General's post, Stakhovich was pointed as Ambassador to Madrid but before he could reach Madrid the October Revolution took place.

Stakhovich died in exile in Aix-en-Provence, France in 1923. He was buried in Sainte-Geneviève-des-Bois Russian Cemetery, in the southern suburbs of Paris.

== Awards ==
- Order of Saint Anna, 2nd class
- Order of St. Vladimir, 3rd class

== Sources ==
- "Стахович, Михаил Александрович (политический деятель)" . Brockhaus and Efron Encyclopedic Dictionary (in Russian). 1906.

Political offices
Preceded by Franz Albert Seyn	Governor-General of Finland; 1917	Succeeded by Nikolai Vissarionovich Nekrasov
