= Russian Constitution of 1906 =

Reorganization of the Imperial Russian government following the 1905 revolution

Fundamental Laws of the Russian Empire Основные Государственные Законы Россійской Имперіи (Osnovnyye Gosudarstvennyye Zakony Rossiyskoy Imperii)
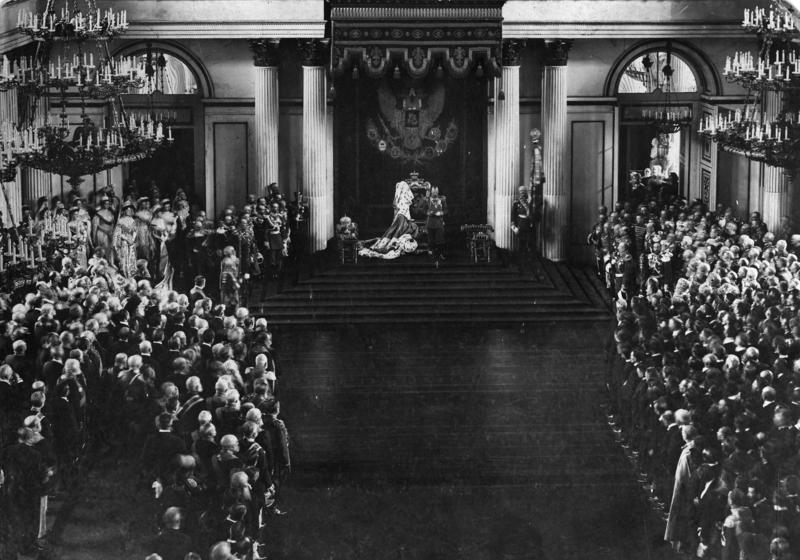
- Nicholas II opening the First Duma, established under the Constitution of 1906
- Created: 6 May [O.S. 23 April] 1906
- Ratified: 6 May [O.S. 23 April] 1906
- Location: Saint Petersburg, Russia; Place where document signed, not location of copies
- Author(s): Mikhail Speransky; Original 1833 version Peter Kharitinov; Revised 1906 version
- Signatories: Emperor Nicholas II of Russia
- Purpose: Constitution for the Russian Empire

The Russian Constitution of 1906 refers to a major revision of the 1832 Fundamental Laws of the Russian Empire, which transformed the formerly absolutist state into one in which the emperor agreed for the first time to share his autocratic power with a parliament. It was enacted on 6 May [O.S. 23 April] 1906, on the eve of the opening of the first State Duma. This first-ever Russian Constitution was a revision of the earlier Fundamental Laws, which had been published as the Code of Laws of the Russian Empire (Russian: Свод законов Российской империи, pre-1918 Russian orthography: Сводъ законовъ Россійской Имперіи) in 1832. It was granted during the Russian Revolution of 1905, in a last-ditch effort by the imperial government to preserve its own existence and keep the empire from disintegration.

The new constitution provided for a bicameral Russian parliament, without whose approval no laws were to be enacted in Russia. This legislature was composed of an upper house, known as the State Council, and a lower house, known as the State Duma. Half of the members of the upper house were appointed by the Tsar, while the other half were elected by various governmental, clerical and commercial interests. Members of the lower house were to be chosen by different classes of the Russian people, through a complex scheme of indirect elections—with the system being weighted to ensure the dominance of the propertied classes. While the Duma held the power of legislation and the right to question the Tsar's ministers, it did not have control over their appointment or dismissal, which was reserved to the monarch alone. Nor could it alter the constitution, save upon the emperor's initiative. The Tsar retained an absolute veto over legislation, as well as the right to dismiss the Duma at any time, for any reason he found suitable. The emperor also had the right to issue decrees during the Duma's absence—though these lost their validity if not approved by the new parliament within two months.

This charter had been granted under duress, and Nicholas abhorred its restrictions upon his power, which he had sworn at his coronation to pass on to his son. He dismissed the First and Second Dumas when they proved "unsatisfactory" to him, and unilaterally altered the election statutes (in violation of the constitution) to ensure that more landed persons would be elected to future Dumas. Although the resulting Third and Fourth Dumas proved more lasting, they still quarreled with the Tsar and his government over the general direction of state policy, and over the fundamental nature of the Russian state. Ultimately, with the outbreak of the Russian Revolution of 1917, the Duma took a leading role in bringing about the Tsar's abdication, which led in turn to the abolition of monarchy and the ascent to power of the Russian Provisional Government under Kerensky. However, that liberal government would be overthrown a few months later in the October Revolution, with the rise of the Bolsheviks.

== Russian government prior to 1906 ==
Prior to the enactment of the 1906 Russian constitution, the Russian Empire had been an absolute monarchy, ruled by an autocratic emperor, who was commonly referred to by his pre-imperial title of "Tsar". The precise regulations by which the Tsar exercised his imperial prerogatives were first codified in 1832, with the issuance of the Set of Laws of the Russian Empire (Свод законов Российскои империи), penned by Mikhail Speransky. These laws could be altered or repealed by the emperor. However, the autocratic Tsars were generally limited by two constraints: they and their spouses must profess the Russian Orthodox faith, and they must obey the laws of succession laid down by Emperor Paul I. Beyond that, the power of the Russian emperor was virtually limitless.

Although a Boyar Duma had existed in Russia from Muscovite times until the rule of Peter I, it was an advisory institution, without legislative prerogatives. Peter abolished this organ in 1721, replacing it with the Governing Senate. This body consisted of nine (later ten) members, and was intended to oversee administration of the empire, under the direction of an Ober-Procurator, appointed (as were all members of this body) by the sovereign. The emperor might submit draft decree proposals to this committee for their deliberation and recommendations, but he was not bound to do so, nor was he required to accept their advice, once tendered. In later years, the Governing Senate took on an important role in administration and law, and by the late nineteenth century it had evolved into the highest judicial organ in Russia, with all officials and legal institutions under its control. Its decisions as to interpretation of the legal code, unless countermanded by the Tsar, were seen as absolutely authoritative. However, the Senate still remained at all times under the monarch's direct control: he named and dismissed its members, could alter its prerogatives, and was free to overrule its actions. As such, the Ruling Senate was never considered to be a "parliament" in the modern sense.

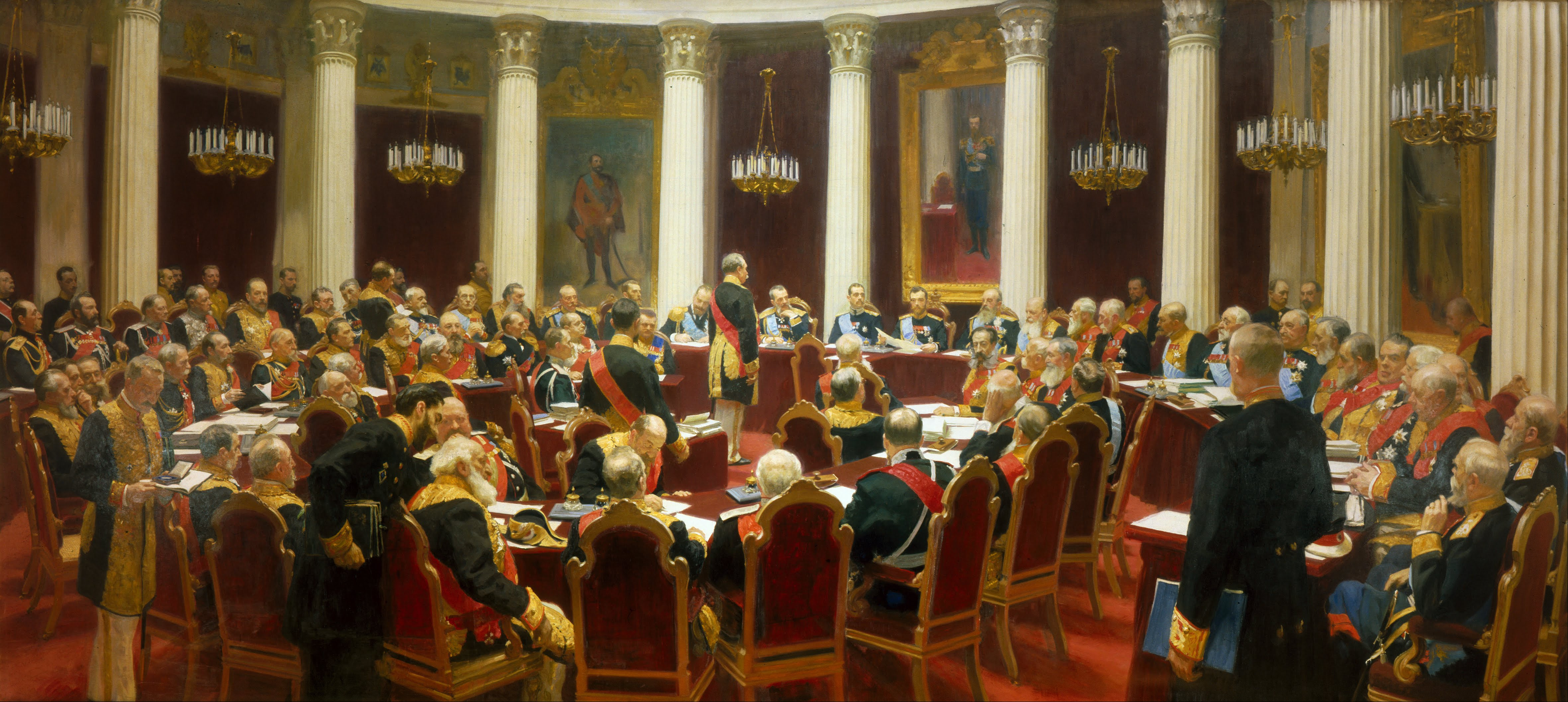
Ceremonial Sitting of the State Council on 7 May 1901 Marking the Centenary of its Foundation. Painting by Ilya Repin, 1903.

Various proposals for reform emerged during the eighteenth and nineteenth centuries: Alexander I formed a Privy Committee to investigate introducing a parliament and ministerial system; the latter was eventually introduced, but the former foundered due to the Napoleonic Wars and opposition from conservative members of the nobility. Alexander did establish a State Council, with 35—later 60—members, whose major duty was the investigation, promulgation and abrogation of laws. Its four departments were:

- Legislative;
- Civil and Ecclesiastical Administration;
- State Economy; and
- Industry, Science and Commerce.

Each department had its own presiding officer (called a State Secretary) and met separately to discuss matters assigned to it. There were also plenary sessions of the whole Council, called to peruse laws proposed by the Tsar's ministers, who were ex-officio members. While most sessions concerned the budget and state expenditures, the Council would examine anything submitted to it. It had no authority to propose changes to existing laws, nor to investigate anything not initiated by the Tsar. Decision-making authority rested with the emperor, who appointed and dismissed members of the Council.

Alexander's nephew Alexander II entertained reformist ideas, culminating in a project initiated by Count Mikhail Loris-Melikov, who had been appointed his Minister of Interior in August 1880. One of these proposals would have established two Imperial commissions, to be populated by indirectly elected members, who would advise the Emperor on further reforms. Alexander's assassination, on the very day he intended to sign this proposal into law, effectively killed all mention of legislative reform in Russia—as the murdered Tsar's son, Alexander III, insisted upon preserving the autocracy intact. Nicholas II, who succeeded his father in 1894, was also committed to maintain absolute monarchy, even in the face of ever-increasing calls for reform, peasant unrest, and the rise of revolutionary organizations within his empire. When reforms became inevitable, Nicholas would insist upon retaining as much of his previous authority as possible. For instance, faced with demands from municipal and provincial dumas for the establishment of a national legislative assembly, Nicholas offered only a broadening of the local councils' authority, insurance for factory workers, and the abolition of censorship. This was not considered nearly enough for the liberals, who agitated even more for a constitution and far-reaching political reforms.

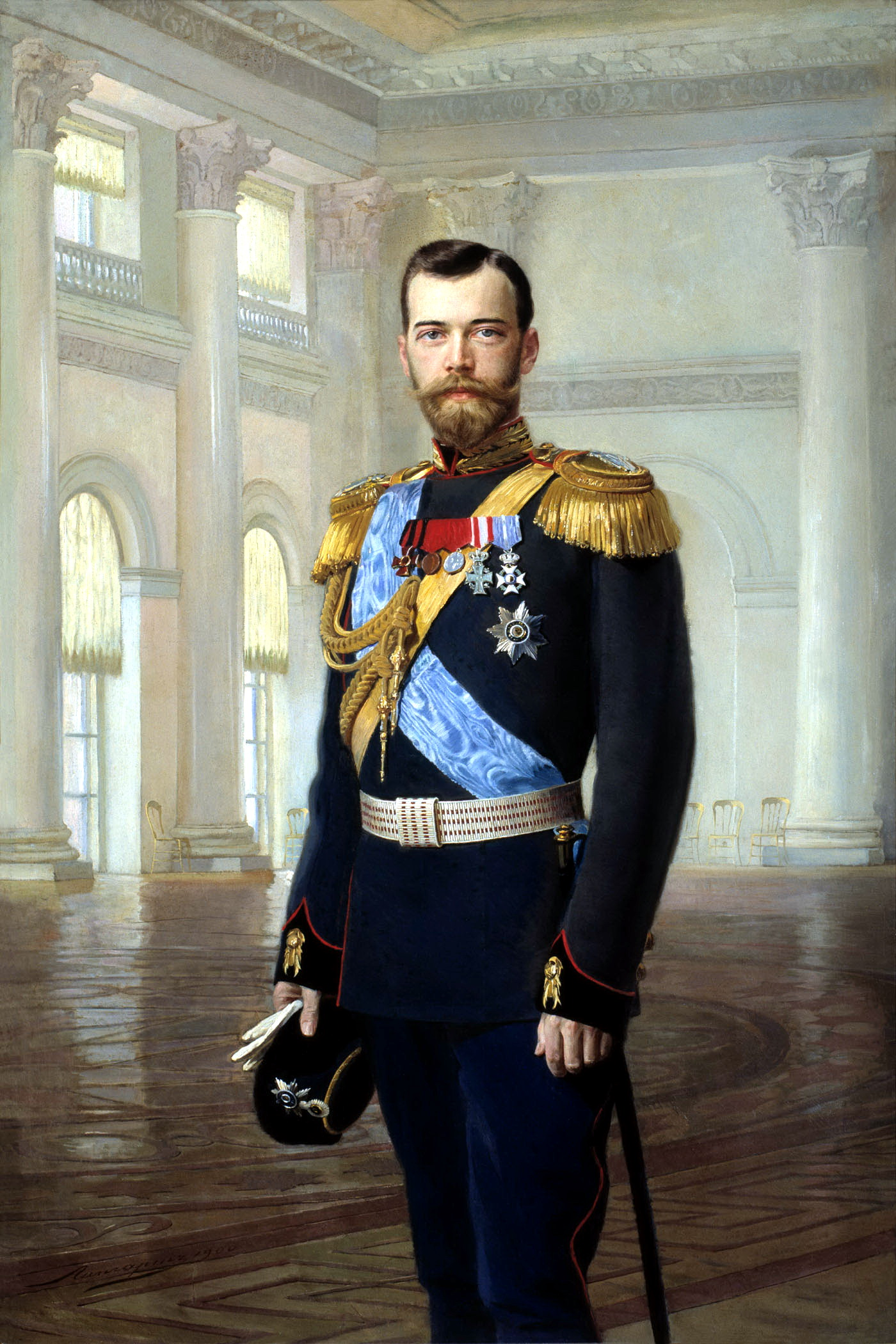
Nicholas II, Emperor of Russia: 1894–1917. Portrait by Ernest Lipgart.

== Adoption of the constitution ==
Russian defeat in the Russo-Japanese War of 1905 combined with a rising tide of revolutionary feeling in Russia to produce the Russian Revolution of 1905. This upheaval was initially provoked by Bloody Sunday, in which thousands of unarmed protesters (largely urban workers and intellectuals) seeking to present a petition to the Tsar were met by imperial troops, who opened fire on them and killed several. As word of this tragedy spread across the empire, it combined with the catastrophic Russian defeat in the Far East to incite a major uprising against the emperor's authority. Although the Tsarist army largely remained loyal to the emperor, close advisors to the Tsar became convinced that some kind of fundamental change in State administration was inevitable, if the monarchy was to survive.

Count Sergei Witte, the Tsar's Minister of Finance and recent Russian plenipotentiary at the Treaty of Portsmouth negotiations (ending the war with Japan), was named chairman of the Tsar's Council of Ministers after returning home from New Hampshire. He proposed introduction of an elected legislature, the granting of basic civil rights, and the formation of a constitutional monarchy. Nicholas strenuously resisted these ideas, but gave in after his first choice to head a military dictatorship, Grand Duke Nicholas, threatened to shoot himself in the head if the Tsar did not accept Witte's suggestion. Nicholas unwillingly agreed, and issued what became known as the October Manifesto on 30 October [O.S. 17 October] 1905, promising basic civil rights and an elected parliament called the Duma, without whose approval no laws were to be enacted in Russia in the future.

Accordingly, three proposed drafts were prepared for a revision of Speransky's Fundamental Laws. The Tsar chose to accept the draft authored by Peter Kharitonov, Deputy State Secretary of the State Chancellory, as the basis for the new constitution. Other constitutions from Austria-Hungary, Japan and Prussia were also studied, as was a draft constitution authored by the Union of Liberation, and published abroad. The State Chancellory prepared a draft, which was discussed during five sessions of the Council of Ministers, where alterations were made to further strengthen the emperor's prerogatives at the expense of the new parliament. Following this, the draft was further discussed and amended under the Tsar's chairmanship; Nicholas chose to officially publish this new constitution on 6 May [O.S. 23 April] 1906. With this act, Russia was officially transformed from an absolute monarchy into a constitutional one, though the exact extent of just how constitutional quickly became the subject of debate, based upon the emperor's subsequent actions.

== Provisions ==
The Russian Constitution of 1906 contained an introduction and eleven chapters: comprising a total of 124 articles:

- The Introduction (Articles 1–3) declared that Russia was "one and indivisible", and mandated the use of Russian in the armed forces and other public institutions. It also acknowledged the Grand Duchy of Finland as an "inseparable part of the Russian state", while ambiguously acknowledging its special legislative and political status.
- Chapter One (Articles 4–24) concerned "the essence of the supreme autocratic power", declaring that the emperor possessed "supreme sovereign power", and that obedience to his commands was mandated by God himself. It provided for the ruler's prerogatives, while making him personally inviolable. The Tsar possessed an absolute veto over all legislation, legislative initiative on all matters, and the sole prerogative to initiate any revision of the constitution itself. The emperor had charge over Russia's administrative and external affairs, and sole power to declare war, make peace and negotiate treaties, as well as the supreme command of the armed forces. The emperor also retained authority over the minting of money, as well as the right to grant pardons and quash judicial proceedings. He appointed and dismissed his ministers at will, and decided the nature and scope of their duties.
- Chapter Two (Articles 25–39) regulated the order of succession to the throne. The thrones of Poland and Finland were declared "inseparable" from that of Russia, while precise rules on succession to the throne were spelled out. Females were eligible to succeed, though they were placed last in order behind all dynastically qualified male descendants of Romanov emperors. A female ruler was guaranteed all the prerogatives and privileges of the imperial office, though her consort was not to take the title of "emperor". Children born to a marriage between a dynastic Romanov and a person "not of corresponding dignity" (defined as "not belonging to any royal or sovereign house") were ineligible for the throne, as was any person who inherited the throne while ruling over another nation whose state religion was not Orthodox, if unwilling to renounce that other throne and faith.
- Chapter Three (Articles 40–82) concerned issues of regency and guardianship, if the emperor was a minor. The age of majority was established at sixteen, and instructions were given concerning the appointment of a regent and a mandatory regency council, together with the prerogatives exercised by the same.
- Chapter Four (Articles 53–56) concerned accession to the throne and the Oath of Allegiance to be sworn by all male citizens of the empire, aged twenty and above, each "according to his faith and law".
- Chapter Five (Articles 57–58) concerned the coronation and anointing of a new sovereign, which was to take place "according to the rite of the Greco-Russian Orthodox Church." Explanatory Note 1 at the end of this chapter indicated that the emperor was conjointly crowned Emperor of Russia and King of Poland. Explanatory Note 2 required him to recite the Nicene Creed according to the Orthodox Christian formula (without the filioque clause), and mandated a specific prayer for him to recite during the ceremony while wearing the Imperial Crown of Russia and holding the sceptre and orb.
- Chapter Six (Articles 59–61) concerned the many formal titles held by the Russian sovereign, together with the precise makeup of the Russian state coat of arms and seal.
- Chapter Seven (Articles 62–68) concerned the relationship of the Russian state to the various religions professed by its subjects. The Orthodox faith was declared the state religion, and both the emperor and his or her consort were required to profess that religion. The Tsar was named as the "supreme defender and guardian" of the Russian Orthodox Church, while those of other confessions were promised full religious liberty, which was also extended to "Jews, Muslims and heathens."

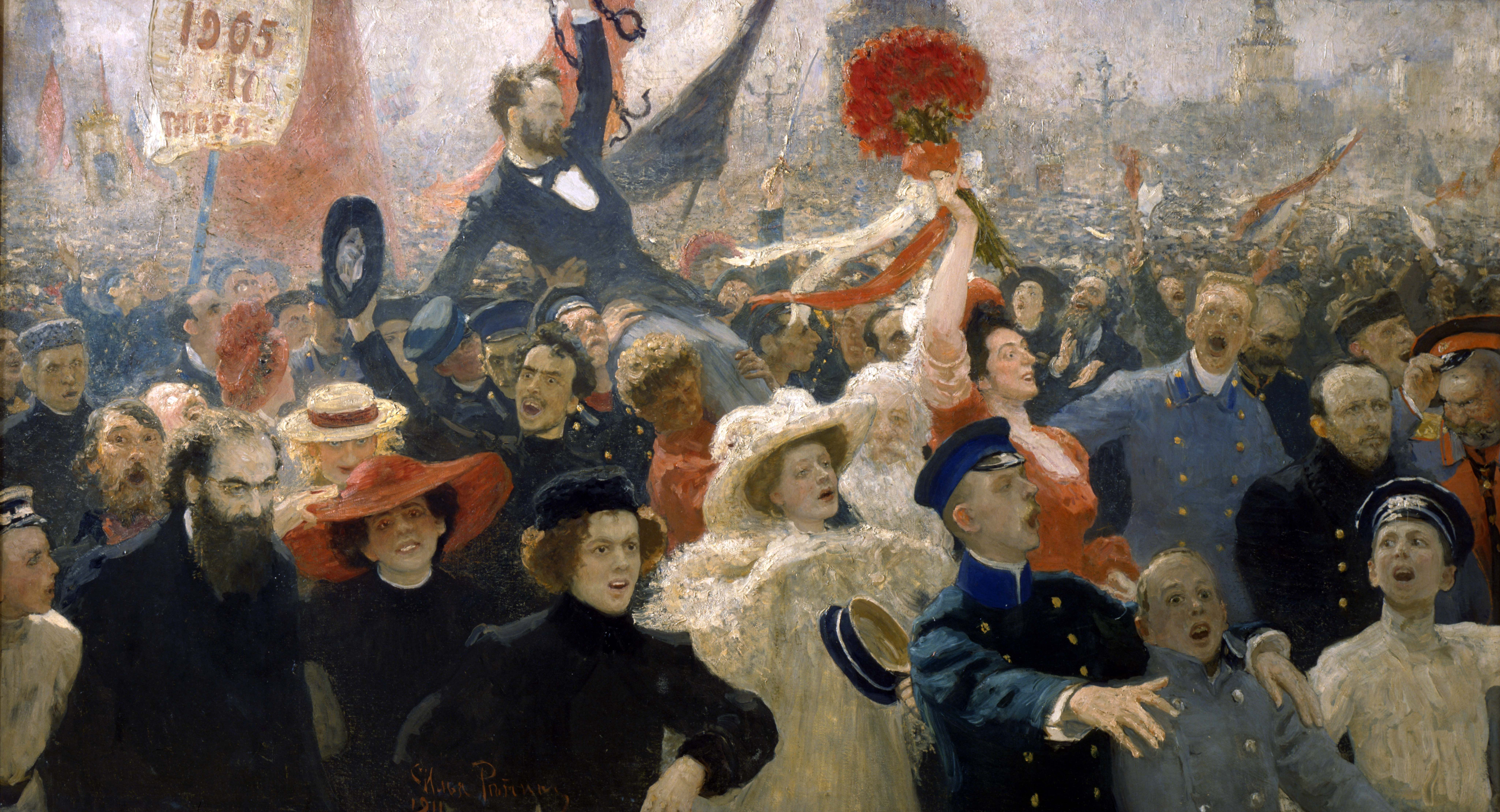
Ilya Repin, 17 October 1905. Russians celebrating the granting of the October Manifesto by Nicholas II, which led to the granting of the 1906 Constitution.

- Chapter Eight (Articles 69–83) concerned the "rights and obligations" of Russian citizens. Citizens were guaranteed protection from arbitrary arrest and detention, the inviolability of their domiciles, protection from illegal search and seizure, the right to travel (subject to restriction), and the right to own private property. Other rights promised in the document included freedom of assembly, freedom of expression, to organize unions and similar organizations, and freedom of religion. Military service was mandatory for all male subjects called to it, regardless of social rank, and payment of taxes and performance of "other duties in accordance with lawful decrees" was required.
- Chapter Nine (Articles 84–97) concerned the promulgation of laws. Article 86 required the approval of the emperor, Duma and State Council for all laws, while Article 87 permitted the Tsar and his cabinet to issue decrees during times when the Duma was not in session. However, these lost their validity if not introduced to the new Duma within two months of its convocation, or if the new Duma or Council refused to confirm them. This article furthermore prohibited the emperor from using this authority to change the Constitution itself, or to change the laws for election to the Duma or Council. Nicholas' violation of this provision during the so-called Coup of June 1907 would irreparably damage his reputation among Russian liberals, and led many to conclude that the entire Russian Constitution was ultimately a sham. This contributed to more revolutionary agitation, and to the Tsar's eventual overthrow in February 1917. The Russian system did not offer any right of impeachment to the legislative branch of government.
- Chapter Ten (Articles 98–119) regulated the modus operandi of the State Council and Duma. Both were required to meet at least once per year, though the duration of their sessions and the length of their recess were the emperor's prerogative. The Tsar was granted the right to appoint up to one-half of the membership of the State Council, while members of the Duma were to be elected for a five-year term according to the state election statutes. Both houses possessed equal rights in legislative matters, while either or both of them could be dissolved at any time by the emperor, though new elections for the Duma must be announced at the same time as its dissolution. Both houses possessed the right of legislative initiative, save in respect to the constitution itself; amendments to the constitution could only be proposed by the monarch. The Imperial Court Ministry was not subject to the Duma's control. Securing of governmental loans was also beyond the legislature's purview, nor was it permitted to refuse or reduce funds to repay such obligations. The Duma was equally prohibited from using its budgetary power to deny manpower requests from the Army or Navy; should the legislature not approve such a petition, the military was allowed to call a new number of draftees equal to the previous year's number.
- Chapter Eleven (Articles 120–124) concerned the Council of Ministers. It established the office of Chairman of the Council of Ministers, and made all members of this council responsible to the emperor for their actions. "Regulations, instructions or orders" issued by this council, or any member thereof, could not contradict existing law. Ministers could be interrogated by either the State Council or Duma for their actions while in office, but only the Tsar could remove them.

== Abolition of the 1906 constitution ==
With the abdication of Tsar Nicholas in February 1917 (Old Style), the government of Russia was initially taken over by a Provisional Government established by the Fourth Duma. Alexander Kerensky, who became the most prominent leader of this government, unilaterally abolished the Russian monarchy on 14 September [O.S. 1 September] 1917, thereby formally abrogating the 1906 Constitution. In November Russia was taken over by the Bolshevik party, leading ultimately to the establishment of the Union of Soviet Socialist Republics on 30 December 1922. Prior to that time, the Communists had enacted a new constitution, firmly establishing Russia as a Bolshevik state. This was in turn superseded by the 1924 Soviet Constitution and the constitutions of 1936 and 1977, the last of which lasted until the fall of the Soviet Union and the adoption of Russia's current governing document in 1993, under which the nation is currently governed.

== See also ==
- Bibliography of the Russian Revolution and Civil War
- Outlines of the Russian Revolutions of 1905 and 1917 and Civil War
- Index of articles related to the Russian Revolution and Civil War
- Constitution of Russia
