= Dmitry Shipov =

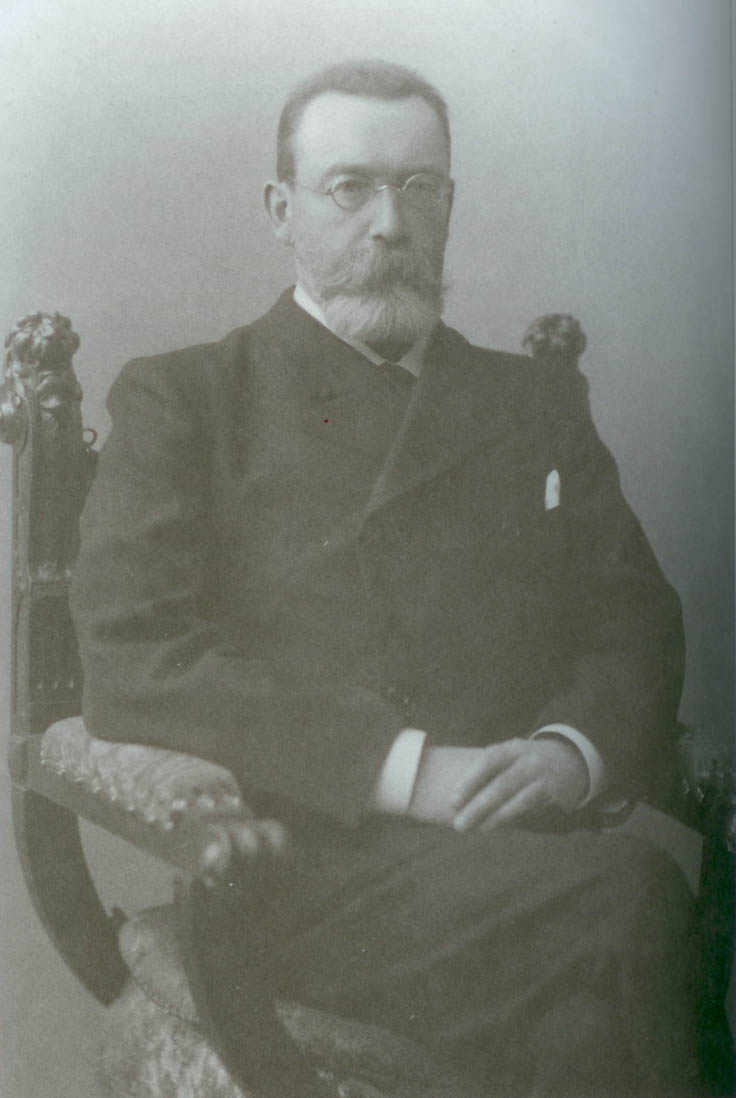
Dmitry Nikolaevich Shipov in 1906.

Dmitry Nikolaevich Shipov (14 May 1851 – 14 January 1920) was a Russian liberal Slavophile politician of the 19th and 20th centuries.

Shipov acted as a political mentor of Georgy Lvov, Russia's future first Prime Minister. According to Solzhenitsyn in “November 1916”, Shipov was not, or ought not to have been considered a ‘Slavophile’, a slandering term at the time assigned to him by his radically leftist opponents—one which appears to have ‘tarred’ him, inaccurately, to this day!"

== Biography ==
=== Early life ===
Shipov was a graduate of St. Petersburg University. He was elected Chairman of Volokolamsk Uezd Zemstvo Board in 1891, and of Moscow Gubernia Zemstvo Board in 1900.

Shipov was a deeply conservative Christian.

=== Career ===
Dmitry Shipov organised the zemstvos at a national level. Despite the zemstvos crucial role in bringing about the 1905 Revolution, the zemstvo men being 'unlikely pioneers', Shipov himself was strongly opposed to the demands for a constitution by the liberals, and was himself a devoted monarchist. He saw it as his mission to strengthen the Tsar's autocracy by bringing the Sovereign 'closer to his people', organised through the zemstvos and a consultative parliament. He believed in a Russia which was a 'locally self-governing land with an autocratic Sovereign at its head', and was a believer in the ancient 'communion' between the Tsar and his subjects, a union he viewed only had been broken by the 'autocracy of bureaucracy'. He argued for more political and civil liberties, but also viewed Tsarism as morally superior to democracy. He viewed the state as an 'indispensable institution for the realisation of Christian ideals'.

Despite his views, he was respected even by those who disagreed with him in the zemstvos, and was the unchallenged leader of the conservative wing in the zemstvo movement.

He was the founder of the All-Zemstvo Organization, which was banned shortly after it was founded in 1896. This drove the 'reluctant revolutionary' Shipov into the ranks of the more 'radical constitutionalists'. He was one of the founders of Beseda in 1899, which was a clandestine discussion circle which consisted of some of the most prominent members of the Russian aristocracy, among them his friend Prince Georgy Lvov. After initially limiting the topic of discussion strictly to the affairs of the zemstvos. After the resumed persecution of the zemstvos from 1900, however, it became an arena for political discussion. It would from 1900 become the 'leading force in the constitutional movement'.

He was elected chairman in the first Zemstvo Assembly from 6–9 November 1904 during the Zemstvo Congress (almost unanimously), when 103 representatives of the zemstvos assembled in various buildings, after finally getting a reluctant Pyotr Dmitrievich Sviatopolk-Mirsky to give permission for their assembly. This was 'in effect' the first national assembly of Russia, and it was compared to the Etats Generaux of 1789 in France. Over 5000 congratulatory arrived the assembly from all over the country, despite Mirsky's ban on publicity. He failed to persuade the Zemstvo Congress of appealing for a consultative rather than legislative representative parliament, and the motion was voted down three-to-one. This caused a split in the liberal movement, between the majority going on to form Constitutional-Democratic Party ("Kadets"), and the minority founding the Union of October 17 ("Octobrists")

Shipov was one of the principal founders of the Octobrist Party, who uttered 'declarations of loyal support' to the Tsar and government in the wake of the Tsar's October Manifesto. When the first cabinet government was to be gathered in October 1905, Sergey Witte offered Shipov the position of Ministry of Agriculture. He, among other liberals, refused the offer. He later joined the Party of Peaceful Renovation in 1908.

He was elected member of the State Council by Moscow zemstvo (1907–1909).

=== Russian Revolution and Death ===
He was part of the member of the National Center after the Bolshevik Revolution. For this, he was arrested by the Cheka on the grounds of being a counterrevolutionary. He was imprisoned by the Bolsheviks in Butyrka prison in 1919. He died January the following year.

== Bibliography ==
- Figes, Orlando (2014). A People's Tragedy: The Russian Revolution 1891–1924. London: The Bodley Head. ISBN 9781847922915.
- Pipes, Richard (2005). Russian Conservatism and Its Critics: A Study in Political Culture. New Haven & London: Yale University Press. ISBN 0300122691.
- V.I. Gurko. Features And Figures Of The Past. Government And Opinion In The Reign Of Nicholas II.
