= Union of October 17 =

Union of 17 October Союз 17 Октября
- President: Alexander Guchkov (1907-1917)
- Founders: Dmitry Shipov; Pavel Korff; Alexander Guchkov; Mikhail Stakhovich
- Founded: Late October 1905 (de facto formation); 8–12 February 1906 (first congress)
- Dissolved: After 16 March 1917
- Headquarters: Saint Petersburg, Russian Empire
- Newspaper: Word; Voice of Moscow
- Ideology: Reformism; Liberal conservatism; Monarchism (Russian); Pro–Stolypin reform
- Political position: Centre-right to right-wing
- National affiliation: Progressive Bloc (1915–1917)
- Colours: Blue and white
- State Duma (1906): 13 / 497
- State Duma (Jan 1907): 35 / 518
- State Duma (Oct 1907): 154 / 441
- State Duma (1912): 98 / 442

The Union of 17 October (Russian: Союз 17 Октября, Soyuz 17 Oktyabrya), commonly known as the Octobrist Party (Russian: Октябристы, Oktyabristy), was a liberal-reformist constitutional monarchist political party in late Imperial Russia. It represented moderately right-wing, anti-revolutionary and constitutionalist views.

== History ==
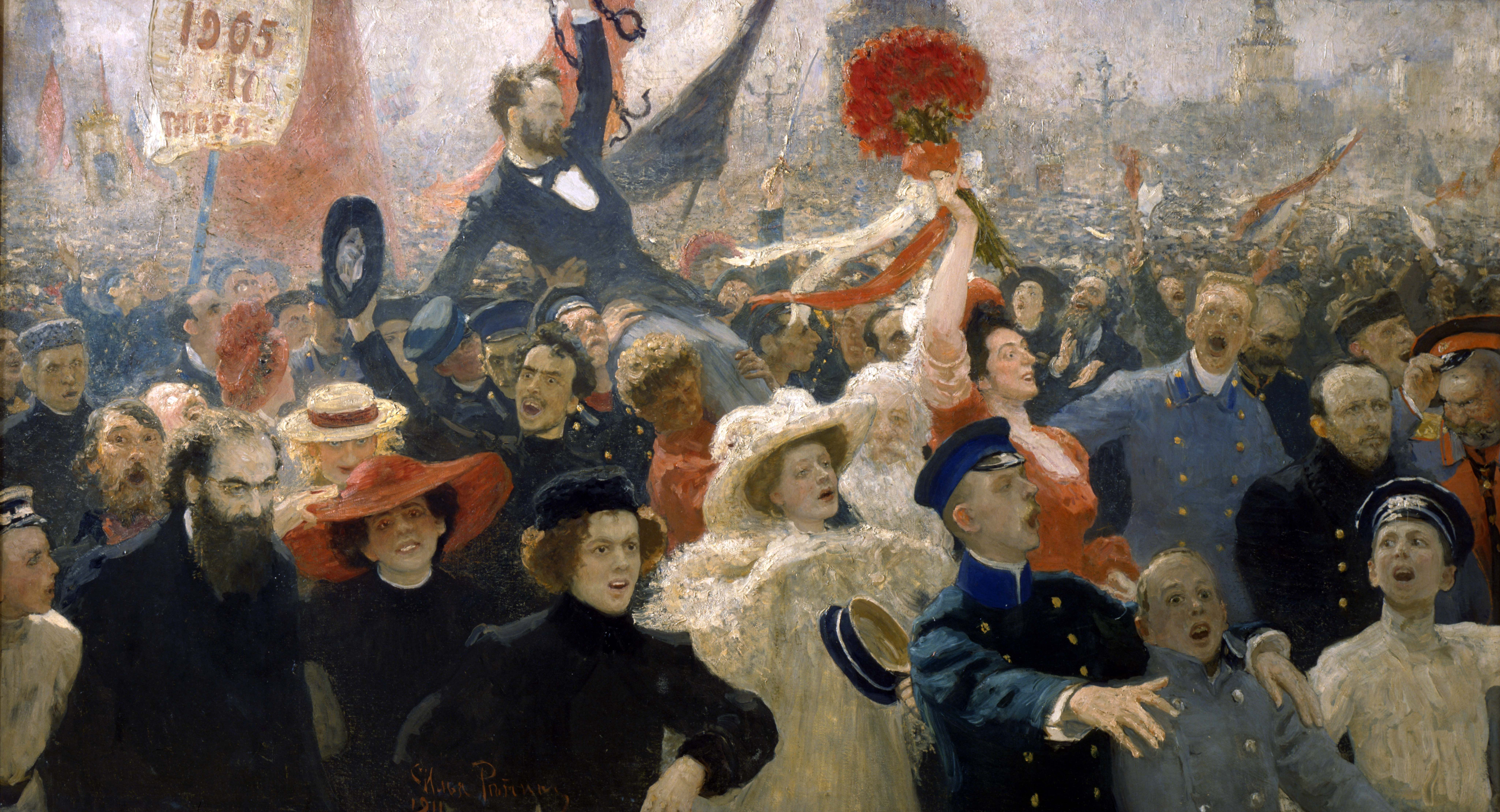
Demonstration 17 October 1905, painting by Ilya Repin.

The party's programme of moderate constitutionalism called for the fulfilment of Tsar Nicholas II's October Manifesto, granted on 30 October [O.S. 17 October] 1905 at the peak of the Russian Revolution of 1905. Founded shortly afterwards, from 1906 it was led by the industrialist Alexander Guchkov, who drew support from centrist-liberal gentry, businessmen and some bureaucrats.

Unlike their immediate neighbours to the left, the Constitutional Democrats, the Octobrists were firmly committed to a system of constitutional monarchy. At the same time they emphasised the need for a strong parliament and a government that would be responsible to it. They were generally allied with the governments of Sergei Witte in 1905–1906 and Pyotr Stolypin in 1906–1911, but they criticised the government for taking extralegal measures and a slow pace of reforms, especially after the revolution ended in 1907 and they no longer saw the need for the extraordinary measures that they reluctantly supported in 1905–1907. The Octobrists' programme included private farming and further land reform, which were in tune with Stolypin's programme. They also supported the government in its unwillingness to grant political autonomy to ethnic minorities within the empire although they generally opposed legal restrictions based on ethnicity and religion. (Note: The Octobrists were constantly under pressure from their Western regional organizations to take a more nationalist line, which affected their position on the issue.)

The Octobrists and groups allied with them did poorly in the 1906 elections of the First and the Second State Dumas. However, after the dissolution of the Second State Duma on June 3, 1907 (Old Style), the election law was changed in favour of propertied classes and the party formed the largest faction in the Third State Duma (1907–1912). The apparent failure of the party to take advantage of that majority and its inability to influence the politics of the government led to a split within the party in 1913 and poor showing in the 1912 Duma election, resulting in a smaller faction in the Fourth State Duma (1912–1917).

In December 1913, after a November conference in St. Petersburg, the Octobrist party split into three factions, which were effectively new parties: the left Octobrists (16 deputies, including I. V. Godnev, S. I. Shidlovskii, and Khomiakov), the zemstvo Octobrists (57 deputies, including Rodzianko, N. I. Antonov, and A. D. Protopopov), and the right Octobrists (13 deputies, including N. P. Shubinskii and G. V. Skoropadskii).

With the outbreak of World War I in August 1914, moderate political parties became moribund in Russia. The Octobrists had but ceased to exist outside the capital, St. Petersburg, by 1915. Several of its prominent members, particularly Guchkov and Mikhail Rodzianko, continued to play a significant role in Russian politics until 1917, when they were instrumental in convincing Nicholas II to abdicate during the February Revolution and in forming the Russian Provisional Government. With the fall of the Romanovs in March, the party became one of the ruling parties in the first Provisional Government. (Note: Originally, Nicholas II abdicated on his own behalf and on behalf of his 12-year-old son Alexei. His more liberal brother Mikhail was next in line to succeed him. Mikhail refused to serve until and unless he was asked by the Constituent Assembly, which left the position of the head of state open. The Provisional Government eventually declared Russia a republic on September 1, 1917, two months before the Constituent Assembly elections in November. The question became moot with the Bolshevik seizure of power on October 25–26, 1917 and their suppression of the Constituent Assembly on January 6, 1918.)

Some members of the party, such as Vladimir Ryabushinsky, later participated in the White Movement after the October Revolution and during the Russian Civil War (1918–1920), becoming active in White émigré circles after the Bolshevik victory in 1920. By that time, the October Revolution had given the term "Octobrist" a completely different meaning and connotation in Russian politics.

== In other parts of the Russian Empire ==
In Ukrainian lands the most prominent figures of the Union of 17 October were Mikhail Rodzianko and Fedir Lyzohub, both descendants of Cossack starshyna, who headed the regional branches of the party in Ekaterinoslav and Poltava governorates respectively. They were opposed to any kind of Ukrainian political autonomy in the Russian Empire, but supported the rights of Ukrainian language and culture. Lyzohub would later become head of government of the Ukrainian State under hetman Pavlo Skoropadsky.

In the Livonian guberniya, a similar party of Baltic German nobility and bourgeoisie named Baltic Constitutional Party (German: Baltische Konstitutionelle Partei) was active; its pendant in the Estonian guberniya was Estonian Constitutional Party.

== See also ==
- Liberalism in Russia
- Russian Revolution of 1905
- Duma
- Mikhail Rodzianko
