= Fourth State Duma of the Russian Empire =

State Duma of the Russian Empire of the Fourth Convocation
| ← | 3rd | Duma dissolved (Note: Provisional Council (as a legislative body under the Provisional Government)) | → |
Russian Social Democratic Labour Party
Labour Group and Progressive Party
Constitutional Democratic Party
Nonpartisans
National minorities (Polish Koło, Muslims, Belarusian–Lithuanian Group
Union of October 17
Rightists, Russian nationalists and centrists

Overview
- Legislative body: State Duma
- Meeting place: Tauride Palace
- Term: 28 [O.S. 15] November 1912 – 19 [O.S. 6] October 1917
- Election: September 1912
- Government: Russian Empire (1912–1917) (Russia) Russian Republic (1917) (Note: It was officially called simply "Russia", the republican form of government and the new name were officially announced only on September 1, 1917.)
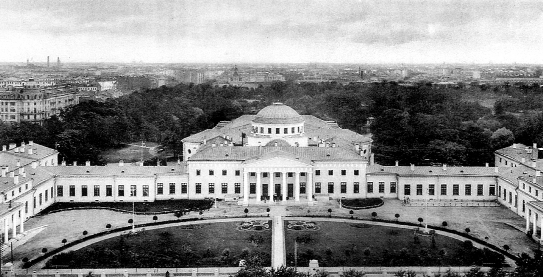
- Members: 442 deputies
- Chairman of the State Duma: Mikhail Rodzianko
- Party control: Union of October 17 (98 deputies)

The State Duma of the Russian Empire of the Fourth Convocation was the representative legislative body of the Russian Empire. The Chairman of the Duma was Mikhail Rodzianko. Elected in September 1912.

== Sessions ==
The State Duma was elected for five years. The Duma worked with annual sessions, within each session, as a rule, two breaks were arranged, at Christmas and at Easter. Each time the Duma was convened and dissolved by the Highest Decrees; in addition, the Duma itself was empowered to arrange breaks in its work. With the outbreak of the First World War, the regular character of the Duma's work was disrupted.

The first session lasted from November 15, 1912 to June 25, 1913, 81 sessions of the General Meeting of the Duma took place.

The second session lasted from October 15, 1913 to June 14, 1914, 111 meetings of the General Meeting of the Duma took place.

On July 26, 1914, an extraordinary one–day session of the Duma took place, dedicated to the allocation of war loans associated with the acute political crisis that preceded the outbreak of the First World War.

The third session began on January 27, 1915; 2 days later, on January 29, immediately after the adoption of the budget, the session of the Duma was declared closed by the emperor.

The fourth session lasted from July 19 to September 3, 1915, after which the Duma was prematurely dissolved by the emperor for vacations, the session then lasted from February 9 to June 20, 1916, 60 meetings of the General Meeting of the Duma were held.

The fifth session began on November 1, 1916. On December 16, the Duma was again dissolved for the holidays. The early dissolution of the Duma turned out to be one of the events that increased the general political tension in the country before the February Revolution. It was widely believed at the time that it was expected that the government would not allow the Duma to convene after the prolonged New Year holidays and would announce its dissolution. However, on February 14, 1917, the emperor announced the continuation of the Duma. At the height of the events of the February Revolution, on February 25, the emperor again suspended the activities of the Duma. The Duma never met again for formal meetings.

On February 27, during a private meeting of members of the Duma, the Provisional Committee of the State Duma was created, which took part in the formation of the Provisional Government, and until the start of its work, that is, February 27 – March 2, it was the self–proclaimed government of Russia. On May 12 – July 19, 1917, eight more private meetings of the Duma were held, which no longer had any legal or political significance.

The Duma was officially dissolved by a decree of the Provisional Government on October 6, 1917 in connection with the appointment of elections to the All–Russian Constituent Assembly.

== Composition ==
Members of the Fourth State Duma

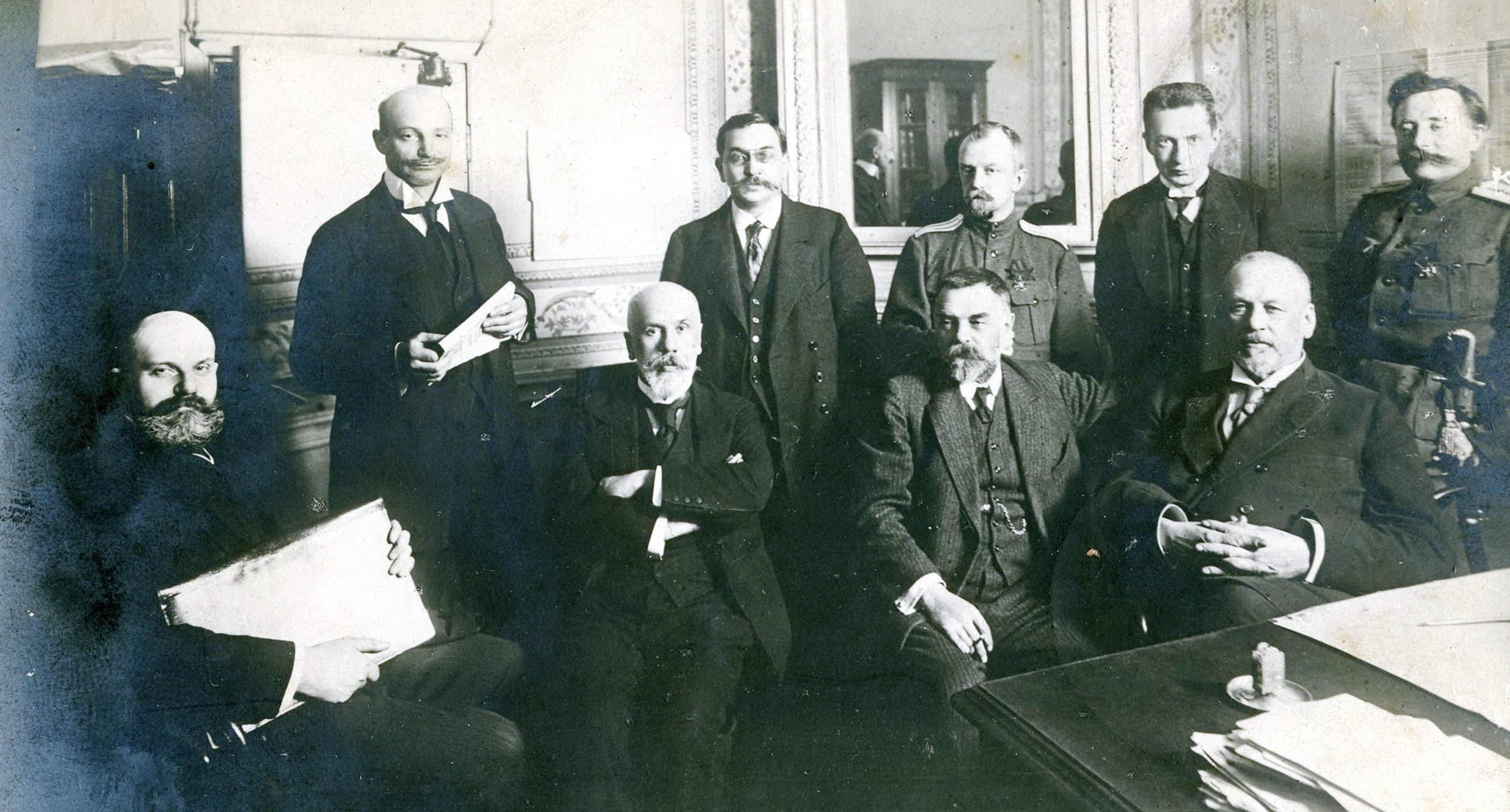
Executive Committee of the Fourth State Duma. Standing: Vasily Shulgin, Ivan Dmitriukov, Unspecified, Alexander Kerensky, Mikhail Karaulov; sitting: Vladimir Lvov, Vladimir Rzhevsky, Sergey Shidlovsky, Mikhail Rodzyanko

The Fourth Duma had pronounced flanks (left and right) with a very moderate center. A total of 442 deputies were elected:

- Union of October 17 – 98;
- Nationalists and moderate rightists – 88;
- Right – 65;
- Constitutional Democratic Party – 59;
- Progressive Party – 48;
- Centrists – 32;
- Russian Social Democratic Labour Party – 14 (Mensheviks – 8, Bolsheviks – 6);
- Labour Group – 10;
- Non–partisan – 7.

Parties of different unions:

- Polish Kolo – 9;
- Muslims – 6;
- Belarusian–Lithuanian–Polish Group – 6.

=== Leadership ===
- Chairman of the State Duma — Mikhail Rodzianko.
- Deputy Chairmen: Prince Vladimir Volkonsky, Prince Dmitry Urusov.
- Secretary — Ivan Dmitriukov.
- Deputy Secretaries: Nikolai Antonov, Viktor Basakov, Gaisa Yenikeev, Nikolay Lvov (first deputy), Vasily Shein.

== Official documents ==
First session

- Verbatim Records. Sessions 1–30: (from November 15, 1912 to March 20, 1913) / State Duma, Fourth Convocation, 1912–1913, First Session
- Verbatim Records. Sessions 31–54: (from March 22 to May 24, 1913) / State Duma, Fourth Convocation, 1913, First Session
- Verbatim Records. Sessions 55–81: (from May 27 to June 25, 1913) / State Duma, Fourth Convocation, 1913, First Session
- Verbatim Records. Session 35: April 3, 1913; Session 63: June 4, 1913; Session 78: June 21, 1913; Session 80: July 24, 1913; Session 81: July 25, 1913
- Index to Verbatim Records: (Parts 1–3): Sessions 1–81: (November 15, 1912 – June 25, 1913) / State Duma, Fourth Convocation, 1912–1913, First Session
- Appendices to the Verbatim Records of the State Duma. Issue 1: (No. 1–150) / Fourth Convocation, 1912–1913, First Session
- Appendices to the Verbatim Records of the State Duma. Issue 2: (No. 151–270) / Fourth Convocation, 1912–1913, First Session
- Appendices to the Verbatim Records of the State Duma. Issue 3: (No. 271–365) / Fourth Convocation, 1912–1913, First Session
- Appendices to the Verbatim Records of the State Duma. Issue 4: (No. 366–435) / Fourth Convocation, 1912–1913, First Session
- Appendices to the Verbatim Records of the State Duma. Issue 5: (No. 436–525) / Fourth Convocation, 1912–1913, First Session
- Appendices to the Verbatim Records of the State Duma. Issue 6: (No. 526–637) / Fourth Convocation, 1912–1913, First Session
- Subject Index to the Collection "Supplements to Verbatim Records of the State Duma": Issue 1–6 / Fourth Convocation, 1912–1913, First Session

Second session

- Verbatim Records. Sessions 1–28: (October 15, 1913 – January 21, 1914) / State Duma, Fourth Convocation, 1913–1914, Second Session
- Verbatim Records. Sessions 29–52: (from January 22 to March 19, 1914) / State Duma, Fourth Convocation, 1914, Second Session
- Verbatim Records. Sessions 53–75: (from March 21 to May 5, 1914) / State Duma, Fourth Convocation, 1914, Second Session
- Verbatim Records. Sessions 76–97: (from 7 to 28 May 1914) / State Duma, Fourth Convocation, 1914, Second Session
- Verbatim Records. Sessions 98–111: (from May 30 to June 14, 1914) / State Duma, Fourth Convocation, 1914, Second Session
- Index to Verbatim Records: Parts 1–5: Sessions 1–111: (October 15, 1913 – June 14, 1914) / State Duma, Fourth Convocation, 1913–1914, Second Session
- Appendices to the Verbatim Records of the State Duma. Issue 1: (No. 1–130) / Fourth Convocation, 1913–1914, Second Session
- Appendices to the Verbatim Records of the State Duma. Issue 2: (No. 131–197) / Fourth Convocation, 1913–1914, Second Session
- Appendices to the Verbatim Records of the State Duma. Issue 3: (No. 198–311) / Fourth Convocation, 1913–1914, Second Session
- Appendices to the Verbatim Records of the State Duma. Issue 4: (No. 312–425) / Fourth Convocation, 1913–1914, Second Session
- Appendices to the Verbatim Records of the State Duma. Issue 5: (No. 426–555) / Fourth Convocation, 1913–1914, Second Session
- Appendices to the Verbatim Records of the State Duma. Issue 6: (No. 556–643) / Fourth Convocation, 1913–1914, Second Session
- Appendices to the Verbatim Records of the State Duma. Issue 7: (No. 644–700) / Fourth Convocation, 1913–1914, Second Session
- Appendices to the Verbatim Records of the State Duma. Issue 8: (No. 701–766) / Fourth Convocation, 1913–1914, Second Session
- Appendices to the Verbatim Records of the State Duma. Issue 9: (No. 767–849) / Fourth Convocation, 1913–1914, Second Session
- Appendices to the Verbatim Records of the State Duma. Issue 10: (No. 850–930) / Fourth Convocation, 1913–1914, Second Session
- Subject Index to the Collection "Supplements to Verbatim Records of the State Duma": Issues 1–10 / Fourth Convocation, 1913–1914, Second Session

Third session

- Appendices to the Verbatim Records of the State Duma: Fourth Convocation, 1915, Third Session

Fourth session

- Verbatim Records. Sessions 17–37: (from February 9 to March 15, 1916) / State Duma, Fourth Convocation, 1916, Fourth Session
- Verbatim Records. Sessions 38–60: (March 17 to June 20, 1916) / State Duma, Fourth Convocation, 1916, Fourth Session
- Index to Verbatim Records: Sessions 1–60: (July 19, 1915 – June 20, 1916) / Fourth Convocation, 1915–1916, Fourth Session
- Verbatim Records. Sessions 1–16 (July 19 – September 3, 1915): With an Index Attached to the Verbatim Records / State Duma, Fourth Convocation, 1915, Fourth Session
- Appendices to the Verbatim Records of the State Duma. Issue 1: July 19 – September 3, 1915: (No. 1–57) / Fourth Convocation, 1915–1916, Fourth Session
- Appendices to the Verbatim Records of the State Duma. Issue 2: (No. 58–87) / Fourth Convocation, 1915–1916, Fourth Session
- Appendices to the Verbatim Records of the State Duma. Issue 3: (No. 88–173) / Fourth Convocation, 1915–1916, Fourth Session
- Appendices to the Verbatim Records of the State Duma. Issue 4: (No. 174–289) / Fourth Convocation, 1915–1916, Fourth Session
- Appendices to the Verbatim Records of the State Duma. Issue 5: (No. 290–373) / Fourth Convocation, 1915–1916, Fourth Session
- Subject Index to the Collection "Supplements to Verbatim Records of the State Duma": Issues 1–5 / Fourth Convocation, 1915–1916, Fourth Session

Other

- Verbatim Records of the Private Meeting of Members of the State Duma (Fourth Convocation): 12, 20, 27 May, 3, 5, 28 June, 18 and 19 July 1917

== Sources ==
- Igor Kiryanov (2009). Russian Parliamentarians of the Early 20th Century: New Politicians In a New Political Space. Dissertation for the Degree of Doctor of Historical Sciences. Perm.
