= Pavel Ryabushinsky =

Russian entrepreneur and liberal politician

Ryabushinsky
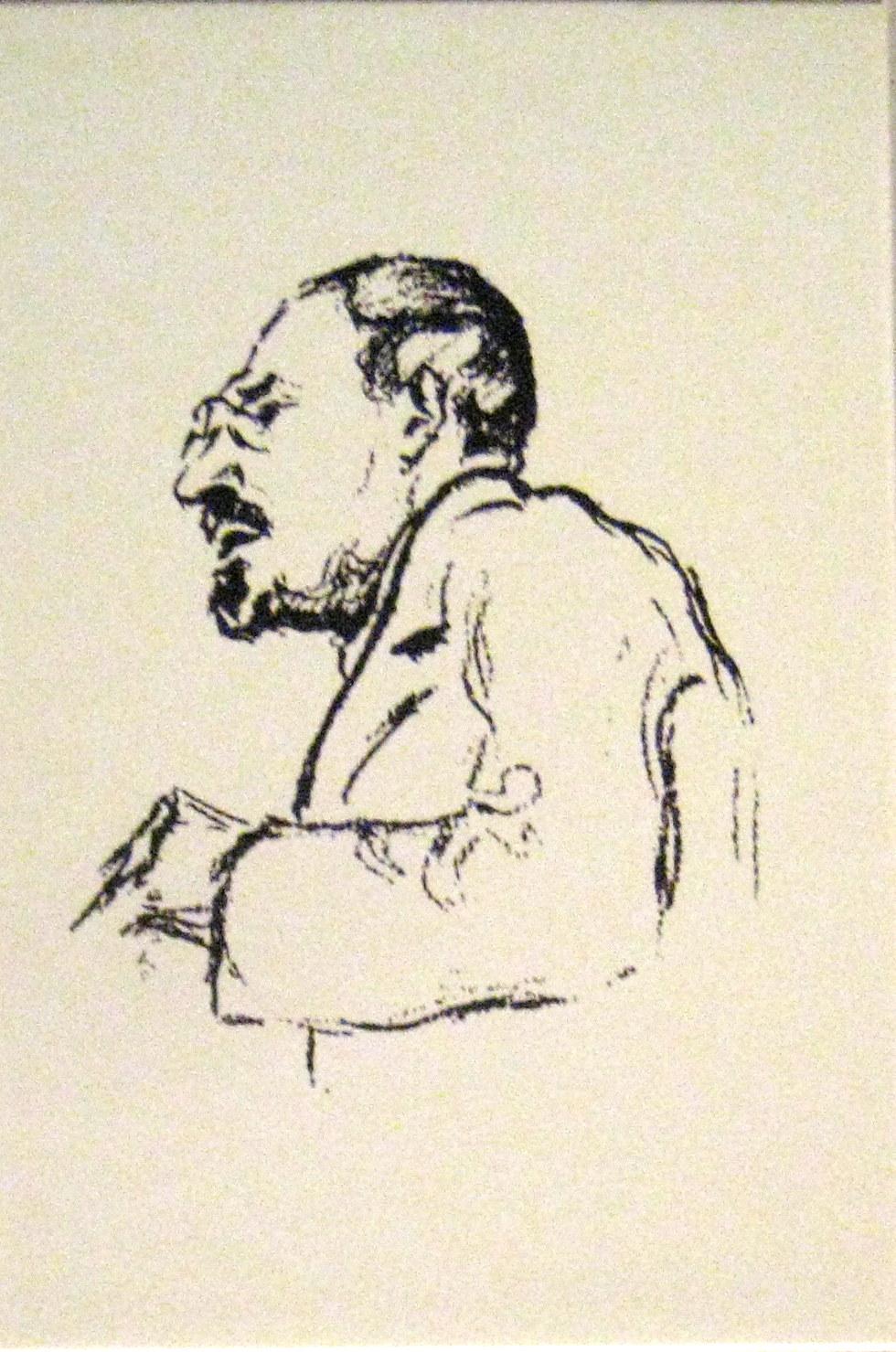
- Ryabushinsky by Yury Artsybushev
- Born: 17 June 1871; Moscow, Russian Empire
- Died: 19 July 1924 (aged 53); Cambo-les-Bains, French Third Republic
- Occupation: Russian politician

Pavel Pavlovich Ryabushinsky (Russian: Па́вел Па́влович Рябуши́нский) (17 June 1871, Moscow – 19 July 1924, Cambo-les-Bains), was a Russian entrepreneur and liberal politician.

== Early life ==
Ryabushinsky was born into the Ryabushinsky dynasty, an Old Believer family that had prospered in the 19th century. His father Mikhail Ryabushinsky was a peasant who moved to Moscow where he adopted the name Ryabushinsky, the name of the settlement where he was born. He was the most successful of Mikhail's three sons. His mother was Evfimia Stepanovna Skvortsova, the daughter of an established Moscow merchant.

Like other scions of such merchant families, he had a good education (he spoke French, German, and English) and was anxious both to be accepted into high society and improve his country.

In 1907, he began publishing his newspaper, Utro Rossii (The Morning of Russia), to propagate his liberal views. Rebuffed by the Constitutional Democrats, who did not want to be associated with the "narrow class interests" of industrialists, he and his fellow Old Believer Aleksandr Konovalov established contact with the "Right Kadets" associated with Peter Struve and began the Economic Discussions of 1909–12, "one of the few sustained collaborations between entrepreneurs and intellectuals in Russian history" (West, p. 46).

He was active in the irregular freemasonic lodge, the Grand Orient of Russia’s Peoples. He and Konovalov founded the Progressist Party, which in 1915 became part of the Progressive Bloc; that same year, he was elected Chairman of the Moscow stock exchange Committee and appointed to head the Moscow War Industry Committee. This organisation exercised considerable autonomy from the Central War Industry Committee, directly negotiating contracts between entrepreneurs and the Military. After the February Revolution he opposed the Soviet and the participation of socialists in the Provisional Government. He gave a widely reported speech at the All-Russian Commercial and Industrial Congress in August, declaring that it was 'necessary for the bony hand of hunger and the people's poverty to grab by the throat the false friends of the people', referring to the Soviets. Following the failure of the Kornilov Affair, which he supported, he withdrew from politics and went to the Crimea for a tuberculosis cure. After the October Revolution he was accused of giving financial support to the All-Russian Teachers' Union, who had refused to continue to work under Bolshevik instruction. He subsequently emigrated to France, where he continued to hope that he and his entrepreneurial class might eventually play a role in the development of his native country.

== Sources ==
- James L. West, "The Riabushinsky Circle" in E. W. Clowes, S. D. Kassow, J. L. West, ed., Between Tsar and People (Princeton UP, 1991), pp. 41–56.
