= State Duma (Russian Empire) =

Legislative assembly in the Russian Empire (1906-1917)

State Duma Государственная дума Gosudarstvennaya Duma
- 4th State Duma

Type
- Type: Lower House of the Governing Senate

History
- Founded: 1905
- Disbanded: 1917
- Preceded by: Zemsky Sobor
- Succeeded by: Provisional Council of the Russian Republic

Leadership
- Chairman of the State Duma: Sergey Muromtsev (first); Mikhail Rodzianko (last)
- Seats: 434–518

Elections
- Voting system: Indirect elections, divided into 4 curiae.
- Last election: September 1912

Meeting place
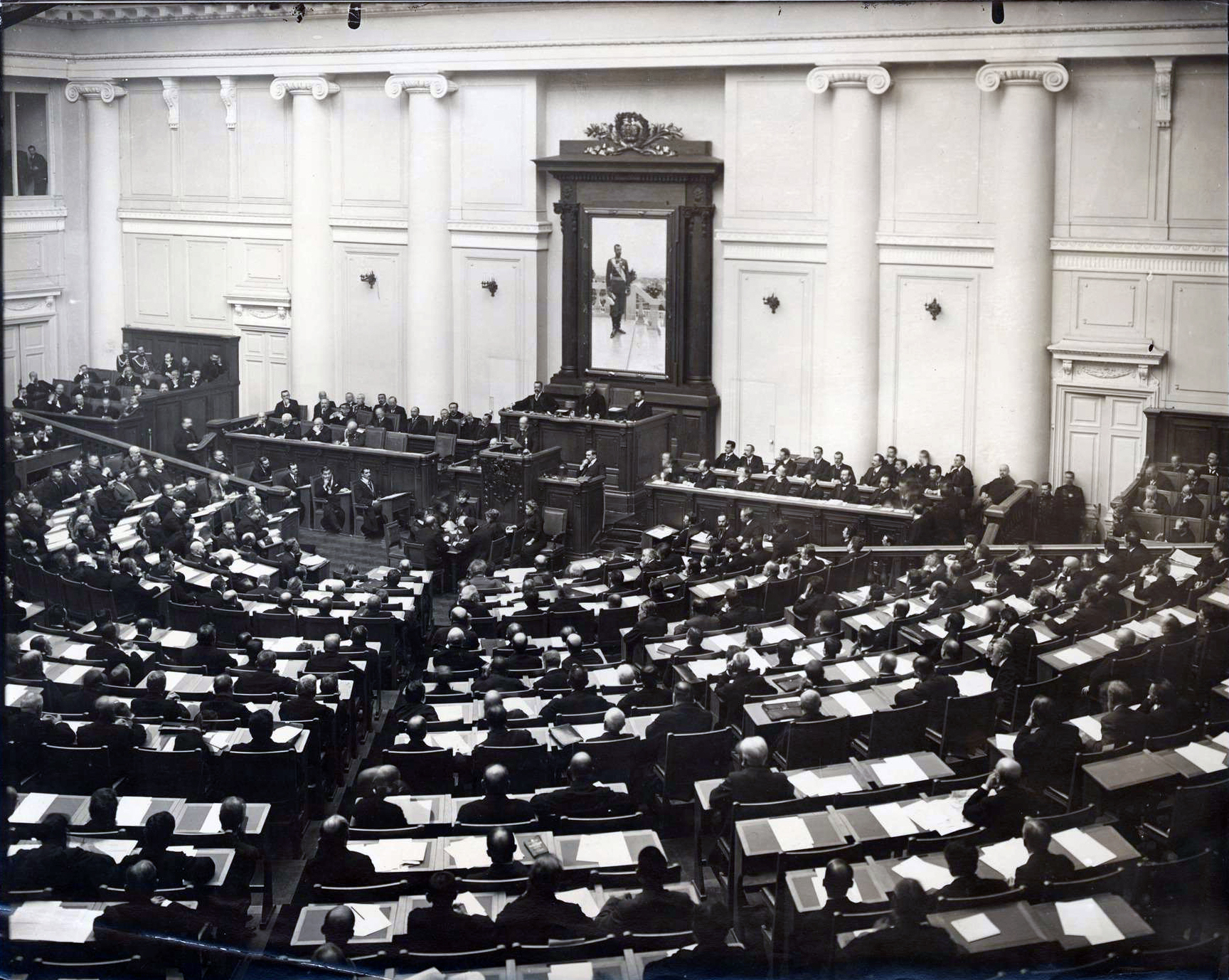
- Tauride Palace, St. Petersburg

The State Duma, also known as the Imperial Duma, was the lower house of the legislature in the Russian Empire, while the upper house was the State Council. It held its meetings in the Tauride Palace in Saint Petersburg. It convened four times between 27 April 1906 and the collapse of the empire in February 1917. The first and the second dumas were more democratic and represented a greater number of nationalities and groups than their successors. The third duma was dominated by gentry, landowners, and businessmen. The fourth duma held five sessions; it existed until 2 March 1917, and was formally dissolved on 6 October 1917.

== History ==
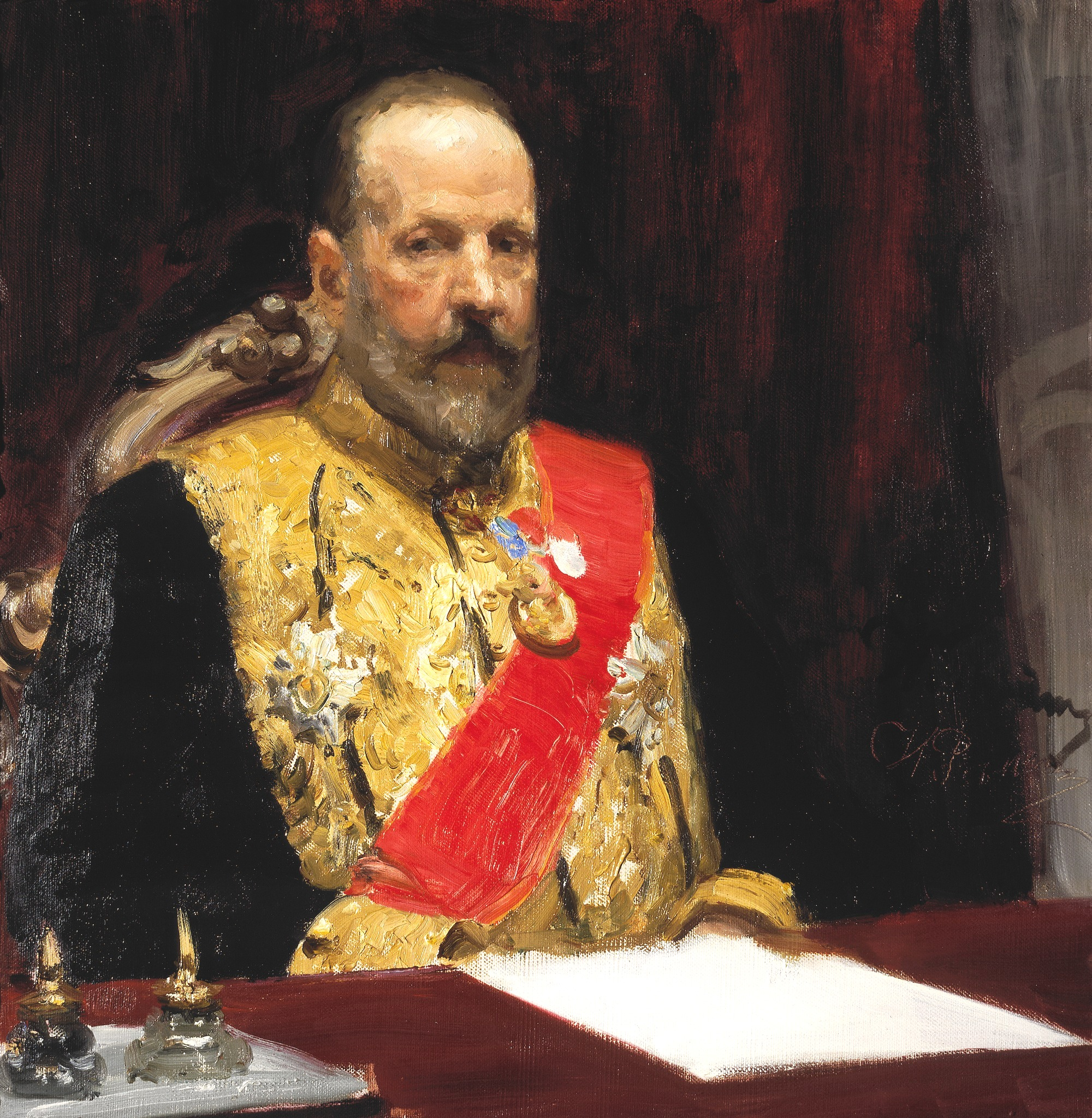
Sergei Witte

Inauguration of the Duma on 10 May 1906
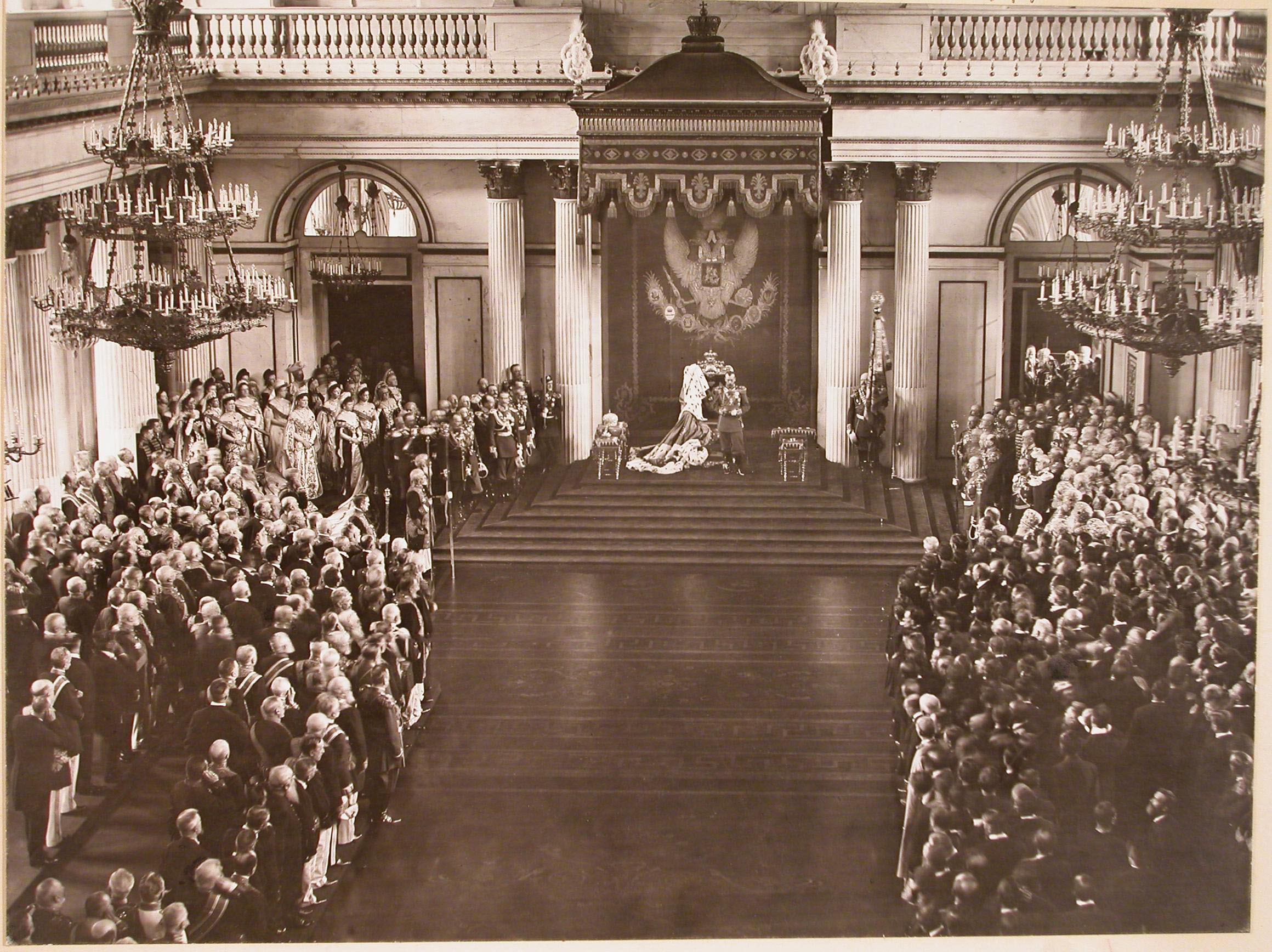
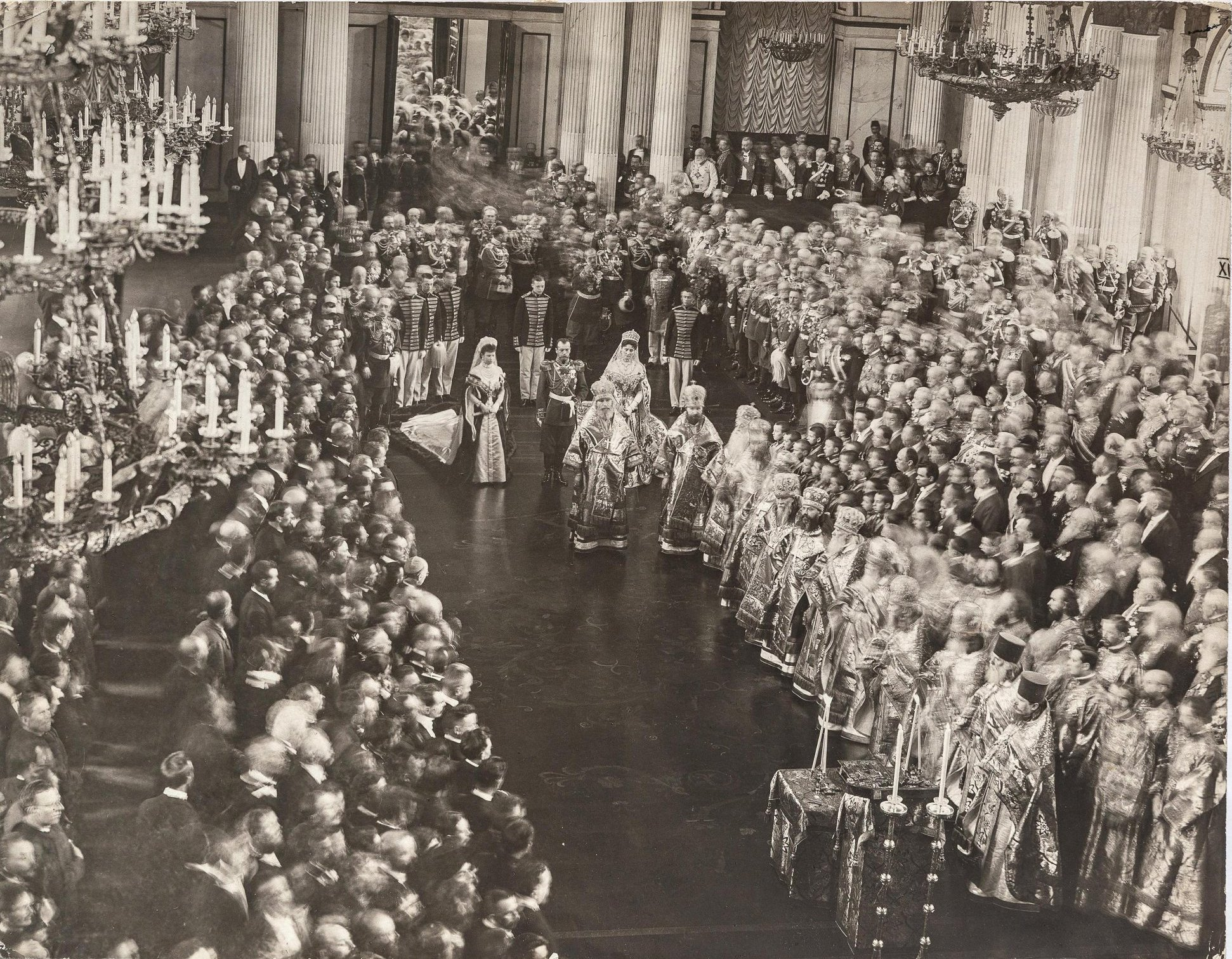
Nicholas II inaugurates the first Duma and the entire Russian parliament for the first time at the Winter Palace on 10 May 1906 (27 April 1906 in the O.S.).

Coming under pressure from the Russian Revolution of 1905, on August 6, 1905 (O.S.), Sergei Witte (appointed by Nicholas II to manage peace negotiations with Japan after the Russo-Japanese War of 1904–1905) issued a manifesto about the convocation of the Duma, initially thought to be a purely advisory body, the so-called Bulygin-Duma. In the subsequent October Manifesto, the emperor promised to introduce further civil liberties, provide for broad participation in a new "State Duma", and endow the Duma with legislative and oversight powers. The State Duma was to be the lower house of a parliament, and the State Council of Imperial Russia the upper house.

However, Nicholas II was determined to retain his autocratic power (in which he succeeded). On 23 April 1906 (O.S.), he issued the Fundamental Laws, which gave him the title of "supreme autocrat". Although no law could be made without the Duma's assent, neither could the Duma pass laws without the approval of the noble-dominated State Council (half of which was to be appointed directly by the emperor), and the emperor himself retained a veto. The laws stipulated that ministers could not be appointed by, and were not responsible to, the Duma, thus denying responsible government at the executive level. Furthermore, Nicholas II had the power to dismiss the Duma and announce new elections whenever he wished; article 87 allowed him to pass temporary (emergency) laws by decrees. All these powers and prerogatives assured that, in practice, the Government of Russia continued to be a non-official absolute monarchy. It was in this context that the first Duma opened four days later, on 27 April 1906.

=== First Duma ===
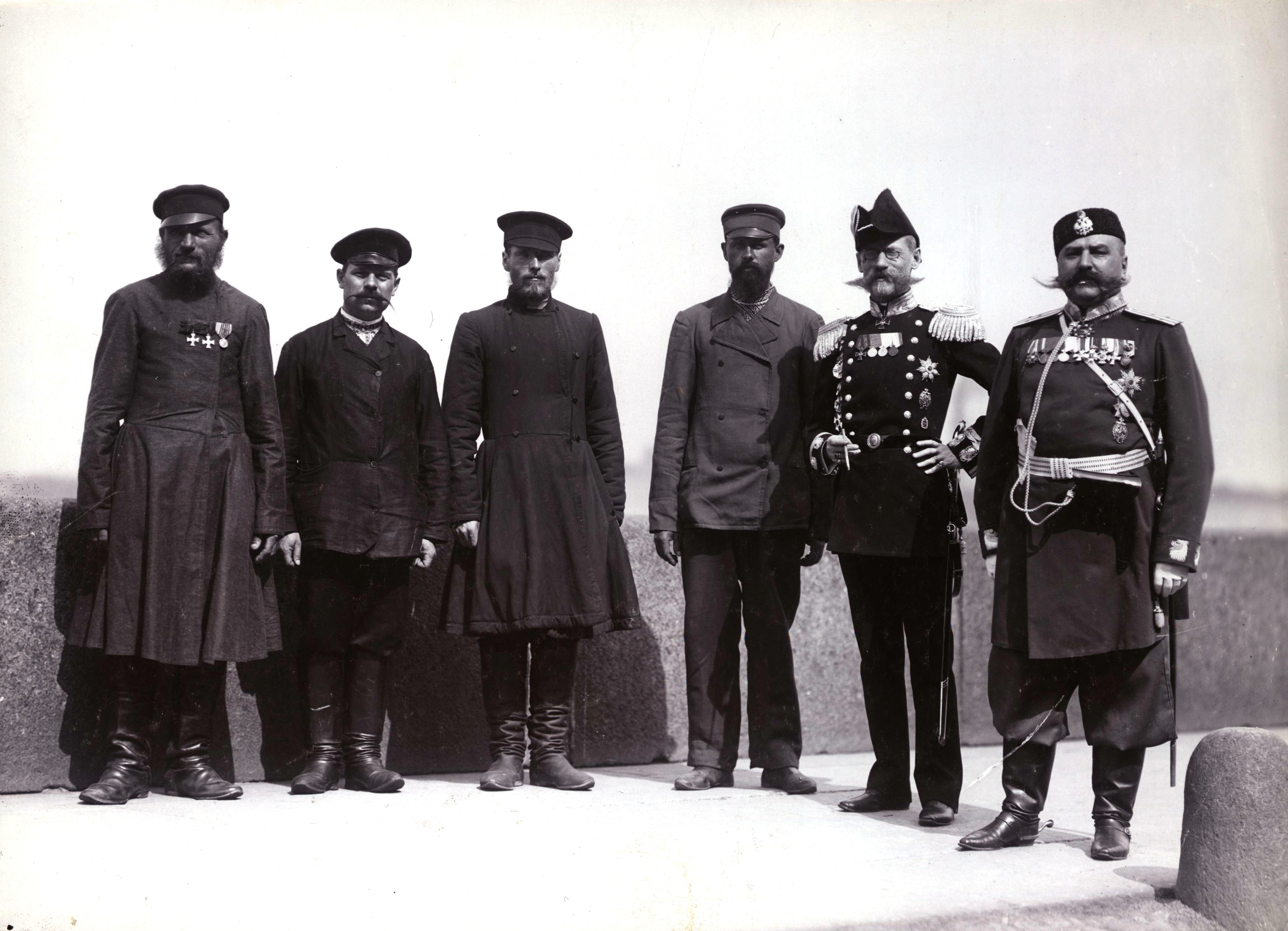
Members of the State Duma with two Russian police officers

The first Duma was established with around 500 deputies; most radical left parties, such as the Party of Socialist-Revolutionaries and the Russian Social Democratic Labour Party had boycotted the election, leaving the moderate Constitutional Democrats (Kadets) with the most deputies (around 184). Second came an alliance of slightly more radical leftists, the Trudoviks (Laborites) with around 100 deputies. To the right of both were a number of smaller parties, including the Octobrists. Together, they had around 45 deputies. Other deputies, mainly from peasant groups, were unaffiliated.

The Kadets were among the only political parties capable of consistently drawing voters due to their relatively moderate political stance. The Kadets drew from an especially urban population, often failing to draw the attention of rural communities who were instead committed to other parties.

The Duma ran for 73 days until 8 July 1906, with little success. The emperor and his loyal prime minister Ivan Goremykin were keen to keep it in check, and reluctant to share power; the Duma, on the other hand, wanted continuing reform, including electoral reform, and, most prominently, land reform. Sergei Muromtsev, Professor of Law at Moscow University, was elected Chairman. Lev Urusov held a famous speech. Scared by this liberalism, the tsar dissolved the parliament, reportedly saying "Curse the Duma. It is all Witte's doing". The same day, Pyotr Stolypin was named as the new prime minister who promoted a coalition cabinet, as did Vasily Maklakov, Alexander Izvolsky, Dmitri Trepov and the emperor.

In frustration, Pavel Milyukov, who regarded the Russian Constitution of 1906 as a mock-constitution, and approximately 200 deputies mostly from the liberal Kadets party decamped to Vyborg, then part of Russian Finland, to discuss the way forward. From there, they issued the Vyborg Appeal, which called for civil disobedience and a revolution. Largely ignored, it ended in their arrest and the closure of Kadet Party offices. This, among other things, helped pave the way for an alternative makeup for the second Duma.

=== Second Duma ===
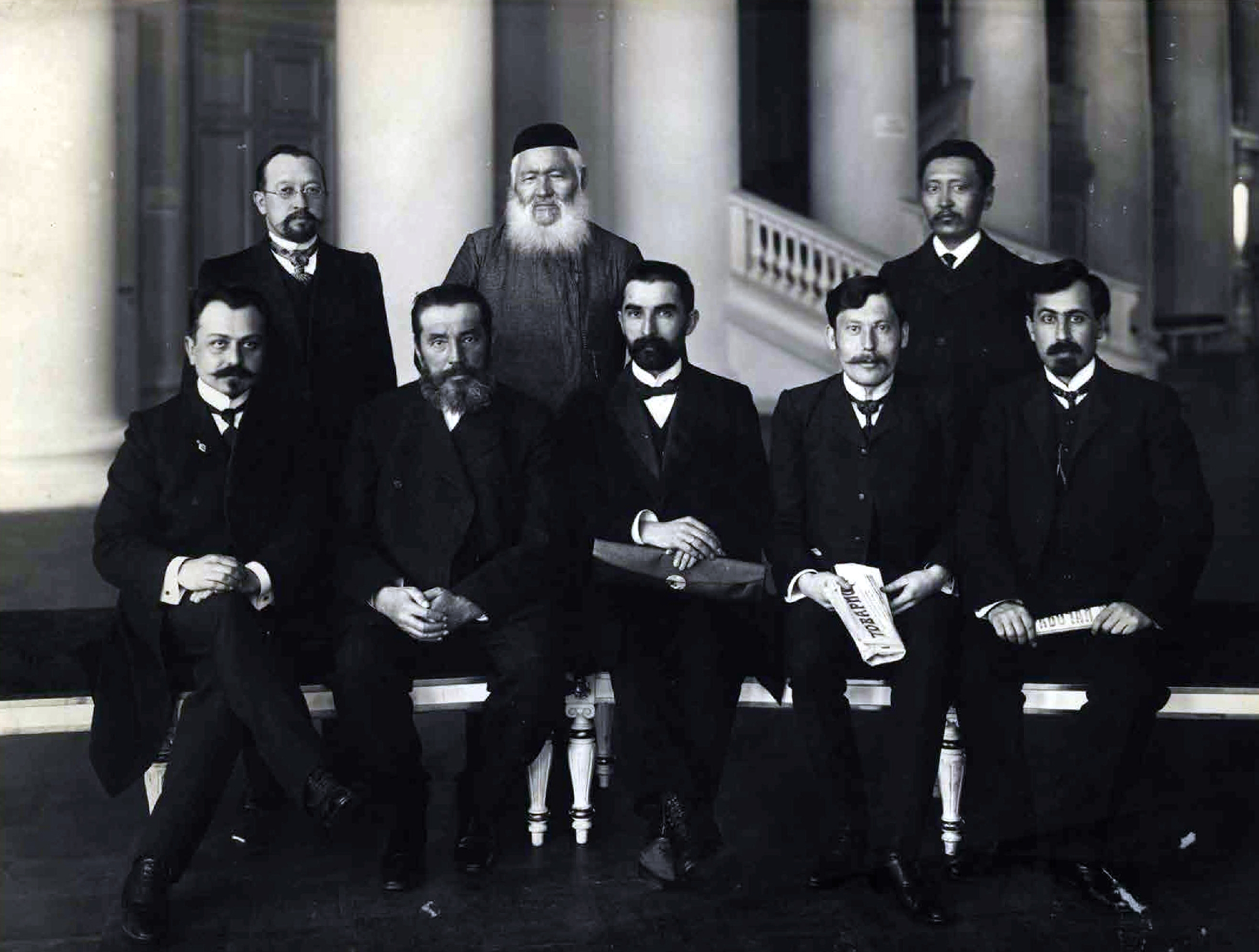
A group of Muslim deputies of the State Duma. Seated left is Fatali Khan Khoyski, seated right is Khalil bey Khasmammadov, 1907

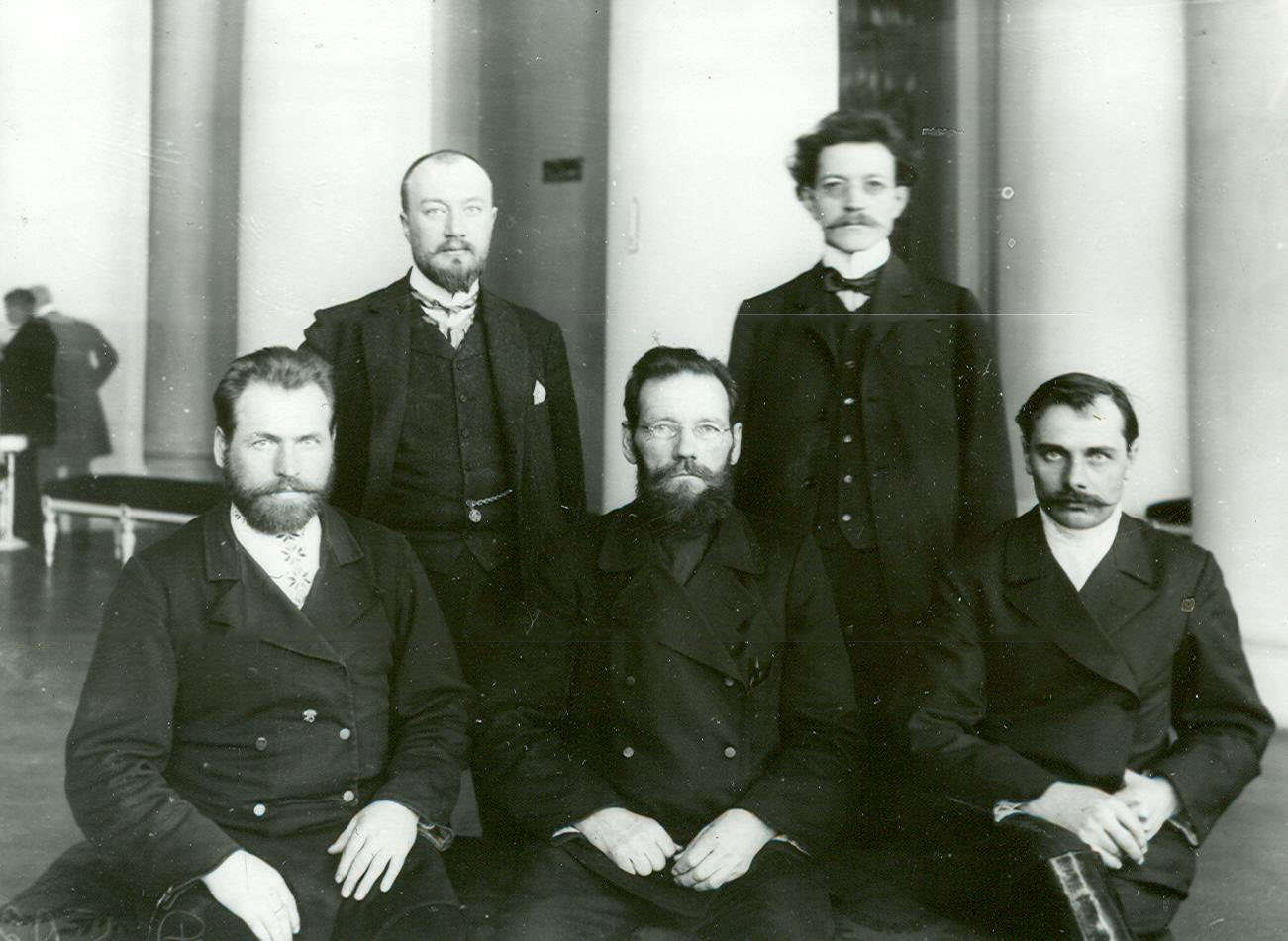
Members of the Russian State Duma from Vologda Guberniya

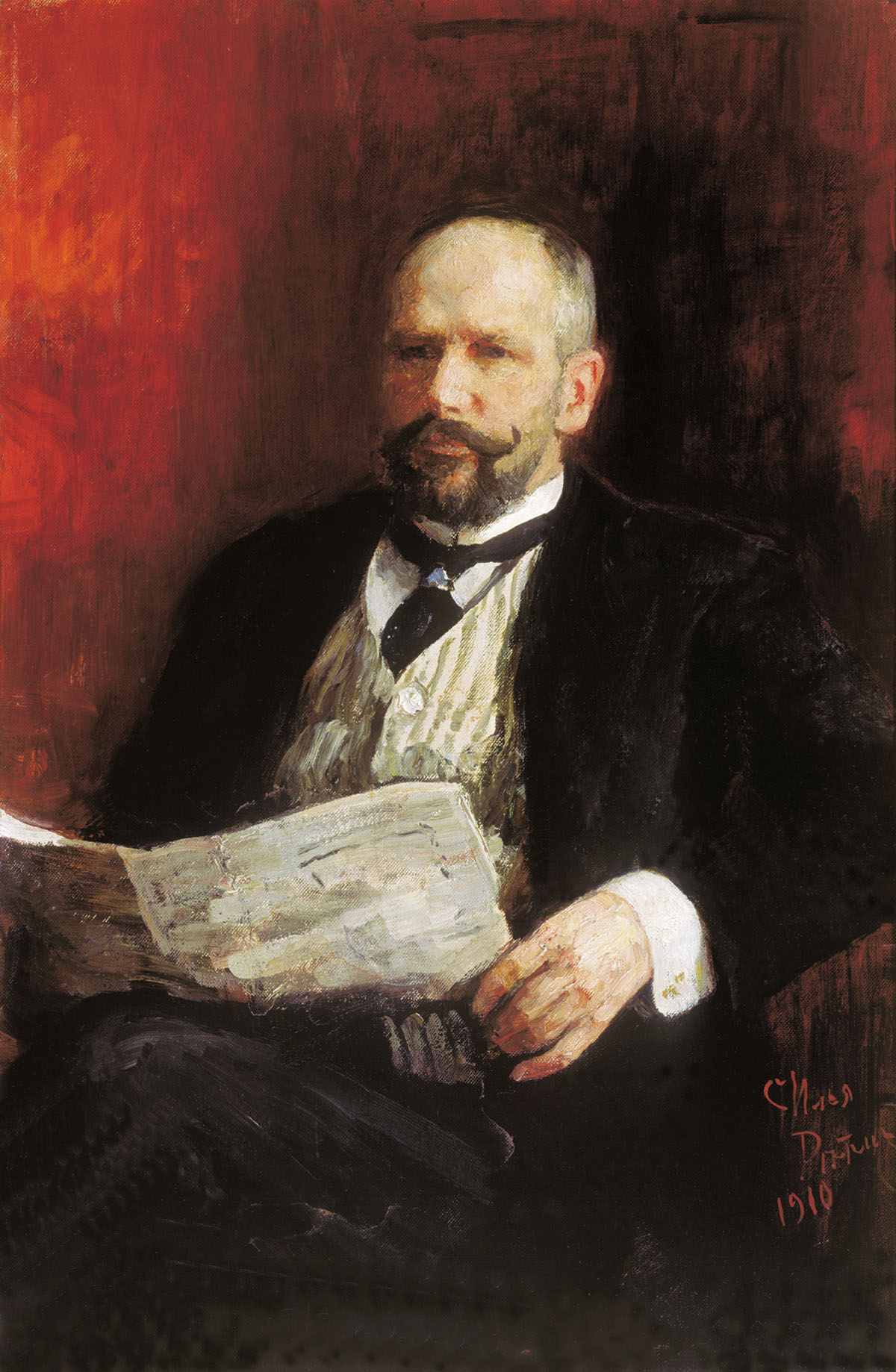
Stolypin by Repin

The Second Duma (from 20 February 1907 to 3 June 1907) lasted 103 days. One of the new members was Vladimir Purishkevich, strongly opposed to the October Manifesto. The Bolsheviks and Mensheviks (that is, both factions of the Russian Social Democratic Labour Party) and the Socialist Revolutionaries all abandoned their policies of boycotting elections to the Duma, and consequently won a number of seats. The election was an overall success for Russian left-wing parties: the Trudoviks won 104 seats, the Social Democrats 65 (47 Mensheviks and 18 Bolsheviks), the Socialist Revolutionaries 37, and the Popular Socialists 16.

The Kadets (by this point the most moderate and centrist party), found themselves outnumbered two-to-one by their more radical counterparts. Even so, Stolypin and the Duma could not build a working relationship, being divided on the issues of land confiscation (which the socialists and, to a lesser extent, the Kadets, supported but the tsar and Stolypin vehemently opposed) and Stolypin's brutal attitude towards law and order.

On 1 June 1907, prime minister Stolypin accused Social Democrats of preparing an armed uprising and demanded that the Duma exclude 55 Social Democrats from Duma sessions and strip 16 of their parliamentary immunity. When this ultimatum was rejected by Duma, it was dissolved on 3 June by an ukase (imperial decree) in what became known as the Coup of June 1907.

On June 3, 1907, the Second Duma was dissolved. The reason was an alleged insurrection attempt planned by Social Democrat members of the Duma based on dubious evidence. In the manifesto dissolving the Duma, Nicholas II went into considerable detail to explain his action: "To Our regret, a significant portion of the members of the second Duma did not justify Our expectations. Many of those sent by the people to work [for them] did not go with a pure heart, with a desire to strengthen Russia and to improve its system, but [went rather] with an explicit intention to increase unrest and to promote the disintegration of the state." The new Duma, according to the Tsar (and Stolypin), "must be Russian in spirit," and the electoral law for the Third Duma reduced the size of the assembly, cutting the representatives in non-Russian regions and cities to prevent the election of Liberals, Socialists, and local Nationalists.

The tsar was unwilling to be rid of the State Duma, despite these problems. Instead, using emergency powers, Stolypin and the tsar changed the electoral law and gave greater electoral value to the votes of landowners and owners of city properties, and less value to the votes of the peasantry, whom he accused of being "misled", and, in the process, breaking his own Fundamental Laws.

=== Third Duma ===
This ensured the third Duma (7 November 1907 – 3 June 1912) would be dominated by gentry, landowners and businessmen. The number of deputies from non-Russian regions was greatly reduced. The system facilitated better, if hardly ideal, cooperation between the Government and the Duma; consequently, the Duma lasted a full five-year term, and succeeded in 200 pieces of legislation and voting on some 2,500 bills. Due to its more noble, and Great Russian composition, the third Duma, like the first, was also given a nickname, "The Duma of the Lords and Lackeys" or "The Master's Duma". The Octobrist party were the largest, with around one-third of all the deputies. This Duma, less radical and more conservative, left clear that the new electoral system would always generate a landowners-controlled Duma in which the tsar would have vast amounts of influence over, which in turn would be under complete submission to the Tsar, unlike the first two Dumas.

In terms of legislation, the Duma supported an improvement in Russia's military capabilities, Stolypin's plans for land reform, and basic social welfare measures. The power of Nicholas' hated land captains was consistently reduced. It also supported more regressive laws, however, such as on the question of Finnish autonomy and Russification, with a fear of the empire breaking up being prevalent. Since the dissolution of the Second Duma a very large proportion of the empire was either under martial law, or one of the milder forms of the state of siege. It was forbidden, for instance, at various times and in various places, to refer to the dissolution of the Second Duma, to the funeral of the Speaker of the First Duma, Muromtsev, and the funeral of Leo Tolstoy, to the fanatical [right-wing] monk Iliodor, or to the notorious agent provocateur, Yevno Azef. Stolypin was assassinated in September 1911 and replaced by his finance minister Vladimir Kokovtsov. It enabled Count Kokovtsov to balance the budget regularly and even to spend on productive purposes.

=== Fourth Duma ===
Alexander Kerensky

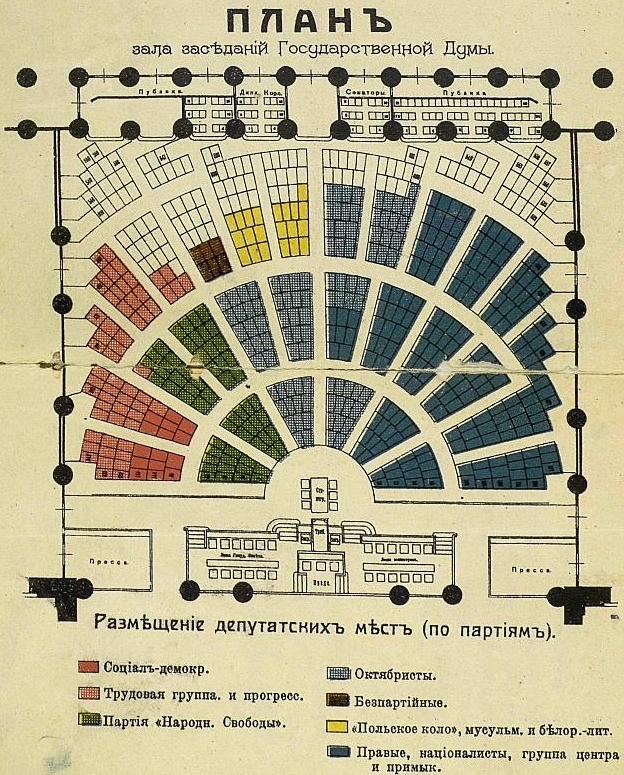
State Duma of the Russian Empire of the 4th convocation

The Fourth Duma of 15 November 1912 – 6 October 1917, elected in September/October, was also of limited political influence. The first session was held from 15 November 1912 to 25 June 1913, and the second session from 15 October 1913 to 14 June 1914. On 1 July 1914, the tsar suggested that the Duma should be reduced to merely a consultative body, but an extraordinary session was held on 26 July 1914 during the July Crisis. The third session gathered from 27 to 29 January 1915, the fourth from 19 July 1915 to 3 September, the fifth from 9 February to 20 June 1916, and the sixth from 1 November to 16 December 1916. No one exactly knew when they would resume their deliberations. It seems the last session was never opened (on 14 February), but kept closed on 27 February 1917.

There was one promising new member in Alexander Kerensky, a Trudovik. Also, Roman Malinovsky, a Bolshevik, was a double agent for the secret police, the Okhrana. In March 1913, the Octobrists, led by Alexander Guchkov, President of the Duma, commissioned an investigation on Grigori Rasputin to research the allegations being a Khlyst. The leading party of the Octobrists divided itself into three different sections.

The Duma "met on 8 August for three hours to pass emergency war credits, [and] it was not asked to remain in session because it would only be in the way." The Duma volunteered its own dissolution until 14 February 1915. A serious conflict arose in January as the government kept information on the battlefield (in April at Gorlice) secret to the Duma. In May Guchkov initiated the War Industries Committees in order to unite industrialists who were supplying the army with ammunition and military equipment, to mobilize industry for war needs and prolonged military action, to put political pressure on the tsarist government. On 17 July 1915 the Duma reconvened for six weeks. Its former members became increasingly displeased with Tsarist control of military and governmental affairs and demanded its own reinstatement. When the tsar refused its call for the replacement of his cabinet on 21 August with a "Ministry of National Confidence", roughly half of the deputies formed a "Progressive Bloc", which in 1917 became a focal point of political resistance. On 3 September 1915 the Duma prorogued.

On the eve of the war the government and the Duma were hovering round one another like indecisive wrestlers, neither side able to make a definite move. The war made the political parties more cooperative and practically formed into one party. When the tsar announced he would leave for the front at Mogilev, the Progressive Bloc was formed, fearing Rasputin's influence over Tsarina Alexandra would increase.

The Duma gathered on 9 February 1916 after the 76-year-old Ivan Goremykin had been replaced by Boris Stürmer as prime minister and on the condition not to mention Rasputin. The deputies were disappointed when Stürmer held his speech. Because of the war, he said, it was not the time for constitutional reforms. For the first time in his life, the tsar made a visit to the Tauride Palace, which made it practically impossible to hiss at the new prime minister.

On 1 November 1916 (Old Style), the Duma reconvened and the government under Boris Stürmer was attacked by Pavel Milyukov in the State Duma, not assembled since February. In his speech he spoke of "Dark Forces", and highlighted numerous governmental failures with the famous question "Is this stupidity or treason?" Alexander Kerensky called the ministers "hired assassins" and "cowards" and said they were "guided by the contemptible Grishka Rasputin!" Stürmer and Alexander Protopopov asked in vain for the dissolution of the Duma. Stürmer's resignation looked like a concession to the Duma. Ivan Grigorovich and Dmitry Shuvayev declared in the Duma that they had confidence in the Russian people, the navy, and the army; the war could be won.

For the Octobrists and the Kadets, who were the liberals in the parliament, Rasputin, and his support of autocracy and absolute monarchy, was one of their main obstacles. The politicians tried to bring the government under control of the Duma. "To the Okhrana it was obvious by the end of 1916 that the liberal Duma project was superfluous, and that the only two options left were repression or a social revolution."

On 19 November, Vladimir Purishkevich, one of the founders of the Black Hundreds, gave a speech in the Duma. He declared the monarchy had become discredited because of what he called the "ministerial leapfrog".

On 2 December, Alexander Trepov ascended the tribune in the Duma to read the government programme. The deputies shouted "down with the Ministers! Down with Protopopov!" The prime minister was not allowed to speak and had to leave the rostrum three times. Trepov threatened to shut the troublesome Duma completely in its attempt to control the tsar. The tsar, his cabinet, Alexandra, and Rasputin discussed when to open the Duma, on 12 or 19 January, 1 or 14 February, or never. Rasputin suggested to keep the Duma closed until February; Alexandra and Protopopov supported him. On Friday, 16 December Milyukov stated in the Duma: "maybe [we will be] dismissed to 9 January, maybe until February", but in the evening the Duma was closed until 12 January, by a decree prepared on the day before. A military guard had been on duty at the building.

The February Revolution began on 22 February when the tsar had left for the front, and strikes broke out in the Putilov workshops. On 23 February (International Women's Day), women in Petrograd joined the strike, demanding woman suffrage, an end to Russian food shortages, and the end of World War I. Although all gathering on the streets were absolutely forbidden, on 25 February, some 250,000 people were on strike. The tsar ordered Sergey Semyonovich Khabalov, an inexperienced and extremely indecisive commander of the Petrograd military district (and Nikolay Iudovich Ivanov) to suppress the rioting by force. Mutinous soldiers of the fourth company of the Pavlovsky Life Guards Regiment refused to fall in on parade when commanded, shot two officers, and joined the protesters on the streets. Nikolai Pokrovsky believed that "no one neither the Duma, nor the government cannot do anything one without the other one." The liberal Vasily Maklakov and Bloc spokesman, expressed his opinion that the resignation of all members of the Council of Ministers was needed, "to make it clear that they want to go in a new way." On Monday soldiers of the Volhynian Life Guards Regiment brought the Lithuanian, Preobrazhensky, and Moscow Regiments out on the street to join the rebellion.

On the 27th, the Duma delegates received an order from his Majesty that he had decided to prorogue the Duma until April, leaving it with no legal authority to act. (Note: On 8 February 1917, on request of the emperor, N. Maklakov and Protopopov drafted the text of a manifesto to dissolve the Duma.) The Duma refused to obey, and gathered in a private meeting. According to Buchanan: "It was an act of madness to prorogue the Duma at a moment like the present." "The delegates decided to form a Provisional Committee of the State Duma. The Provisional Committee ordered the arrest of all the ex-ministers and senior officials." The Tauride Palace was occupied by the crowd and soldiers. "On the evening the Council of Ministers held its last meeting in the Marinsky Palace and formally submitted its resignation to the tsar when they were cut off from the telephone. Guchkov, along with Vasily Shulgin, came to the army headquarters near Pskov to persuade the tsar to abdicate. The committee sent commissars to take over ministries and other government institutions, dismissing Tsar-appointed ministers and formed the Provisional Government under Georgi Lvov.

In the seventeen months of the "Tsarina's rule", from September 1915 to February 1917, Russia had four Prime Ministers, five Ministers of the Interior, three Foreign Ministers, three War Ministers, three Ministers of Transport and four Ministers of Agriculture. This "ministerial leapfrog", as it came to be known, not only removed competent men from power, but also disorganized the work of government since no one remained long enough in office to master their responsibilities.

On 2 March 1917 the Provisional government decided that the Duma would not be reconvened. Following the Kornilov affair and the proclamation of the Russian Republic, the State Duma was dissolved on 6 October 1917 by the Provisional Government; a Provisional Council of the Russian Republic was convened on 20th October 1917 as a provisional parliament, in preparation to the election of the Russian Constituent Assembly.

== Seats held in Imperial Dumas ==
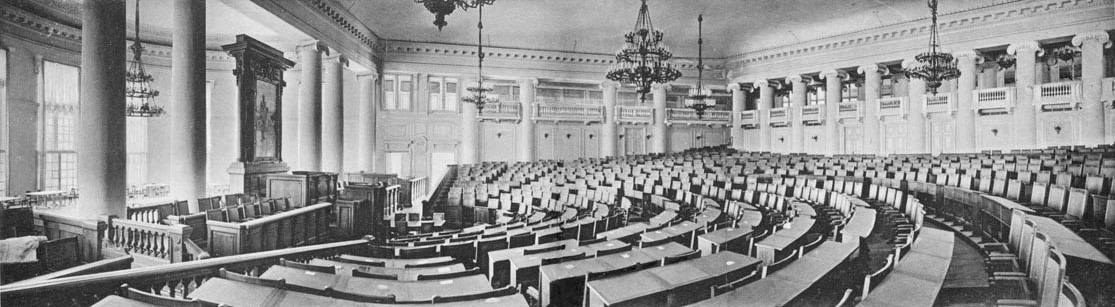
Tauride Palace, seat of the State Duma (modern image).

Party	First Duma	Second Duma	Third Duma	Fourth Duma
Russian Social Democratic Party	17 (Mensheviks)	47 Mensheviks, 18 Bolsheviks	19	14
Socialist-Revolutionary Party	2	37	–	–
Labour group	105	104	13	10
Progressive Party	27	28	28	48
Constitutional Democratic Party (Kadets)	184	98	54	59
Non-Russian National Groups	32	93	45	21
Centre Party	–	–	–	33
Octobrist Party	38	32	154	98
Nationalists	–	–	97	120
Rightists	7	22	50	65
TOTAL	497	518	509	434

== Chairmen of the State Duma ==
- Sergey Muromtsev (1906)
- Fyodor Golovin (1907)
- Nikolay Khomyakov (1907–1910)
- Alexander Guchkov (1910–1911)
- Mikhail Rodzianko (1911–1917)

== Deputy Chairmen of the State Duma ==
- The First Duma
  - Prince Pavel Dolgorukov (Cadet Party) 1906
  - Nikolay Gredeskul (Cadet Party) 1906
- The Second Duma
  - N. N. Podznansky (Left) 1907
  - M. E. Berezik (Trudoviki) 1907
- The Third Duma
  - Vol. V. M. Volkonsky (moderately right), bar. A. F. Meyendorff (Octobrist), C. J. Szydlowski (Octobrist), M. Kapustin (Octobrist), I. Sozonovich (right).
- The Fourth Duma
  - Prince D. D. Urusov (Progressive Bloc)
    - Prince V. M. Volkonsky (Centrum-Right) (1912–1913)
  - Nikolay Nikolayevich Lvov (Progressive Bloc) (1913)
  - Aleksandr Konovalov (Progressive Bloc) (1913–1914)
  - S. T. Varun-Sekret (Octobrist Party) (1913–1916)
  - Alexander Protopopov (Left Wing Octobrist Party) (1914–1916)
  - Nikolai Vissarionovich Nekrasov (Cadet Party) (1916–1917)
  - Count V. A. Bobrinsky (Nationalist) (1916–1917)

== See also ==
- Bibliography of the Russian Revolution and Civil War
- Outline of the Russian Revolution and Civil War
- Index of articles related to the Russian Revolution and Civil War
