= 1912 Russian legislative election =

- September 1912

All 442 seats in the State Duma 222 seats needed for a majority
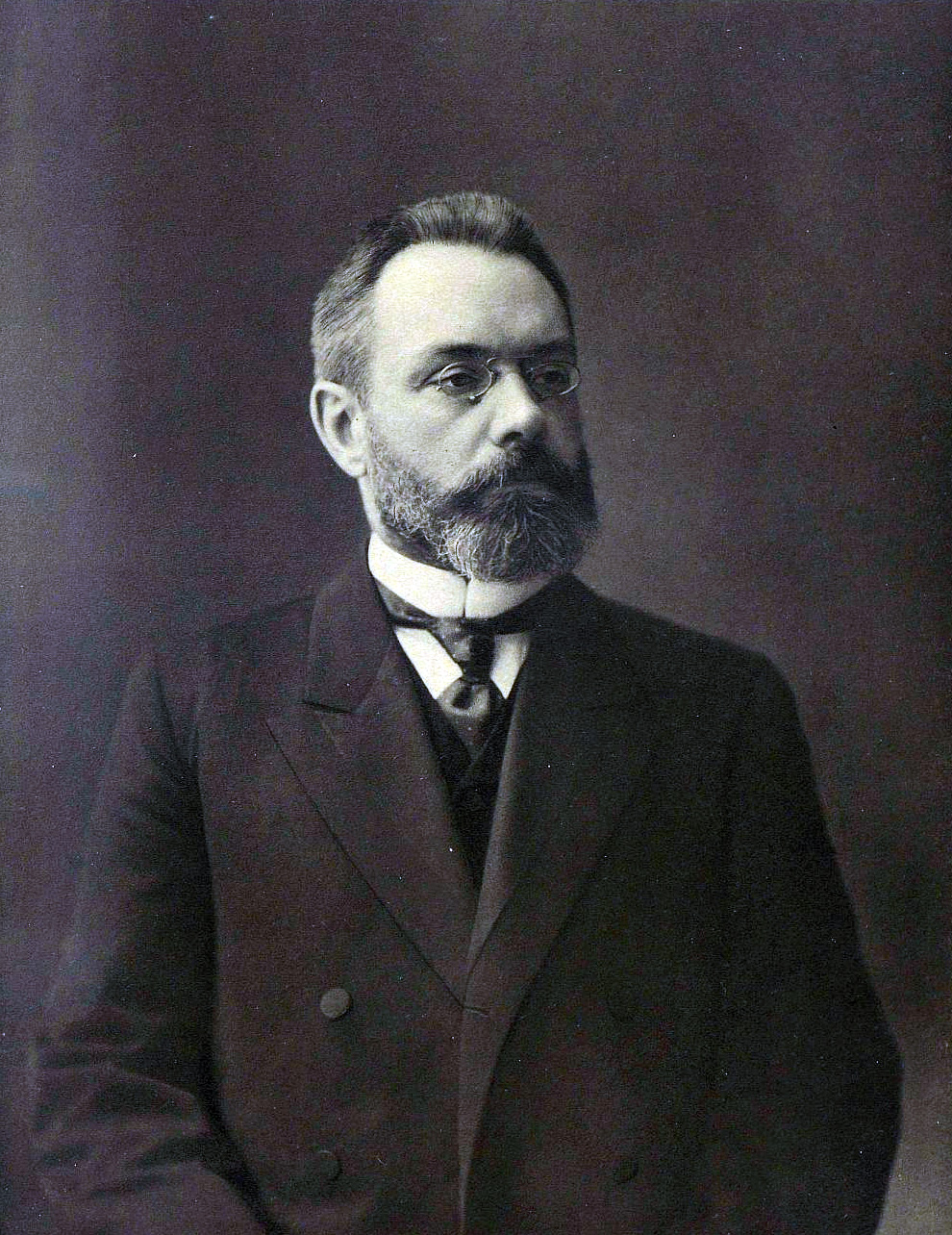

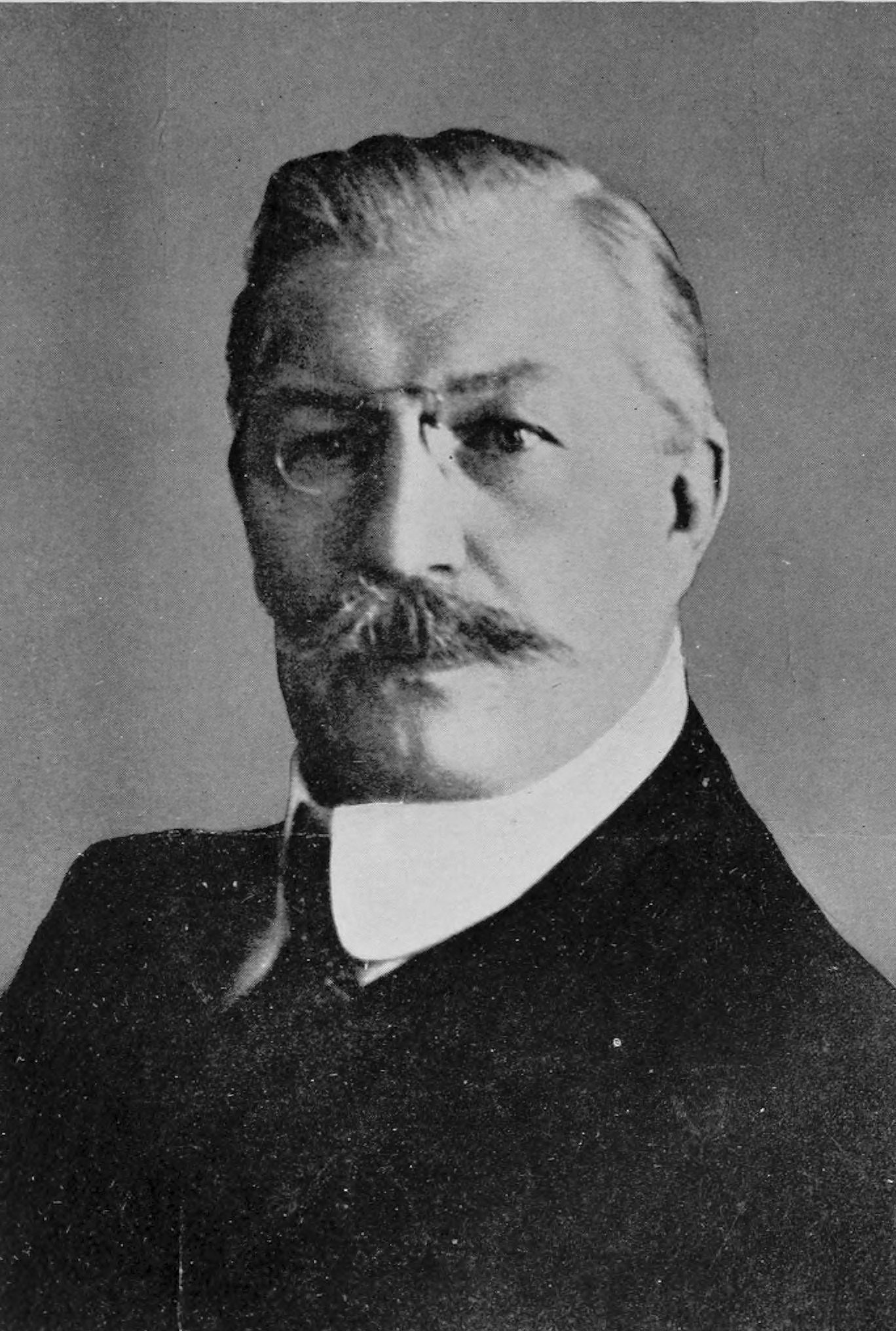

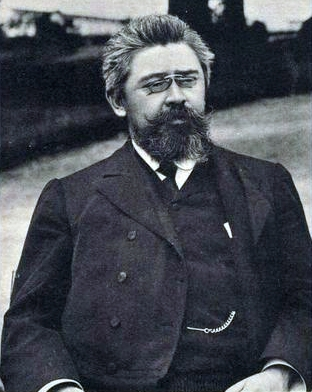

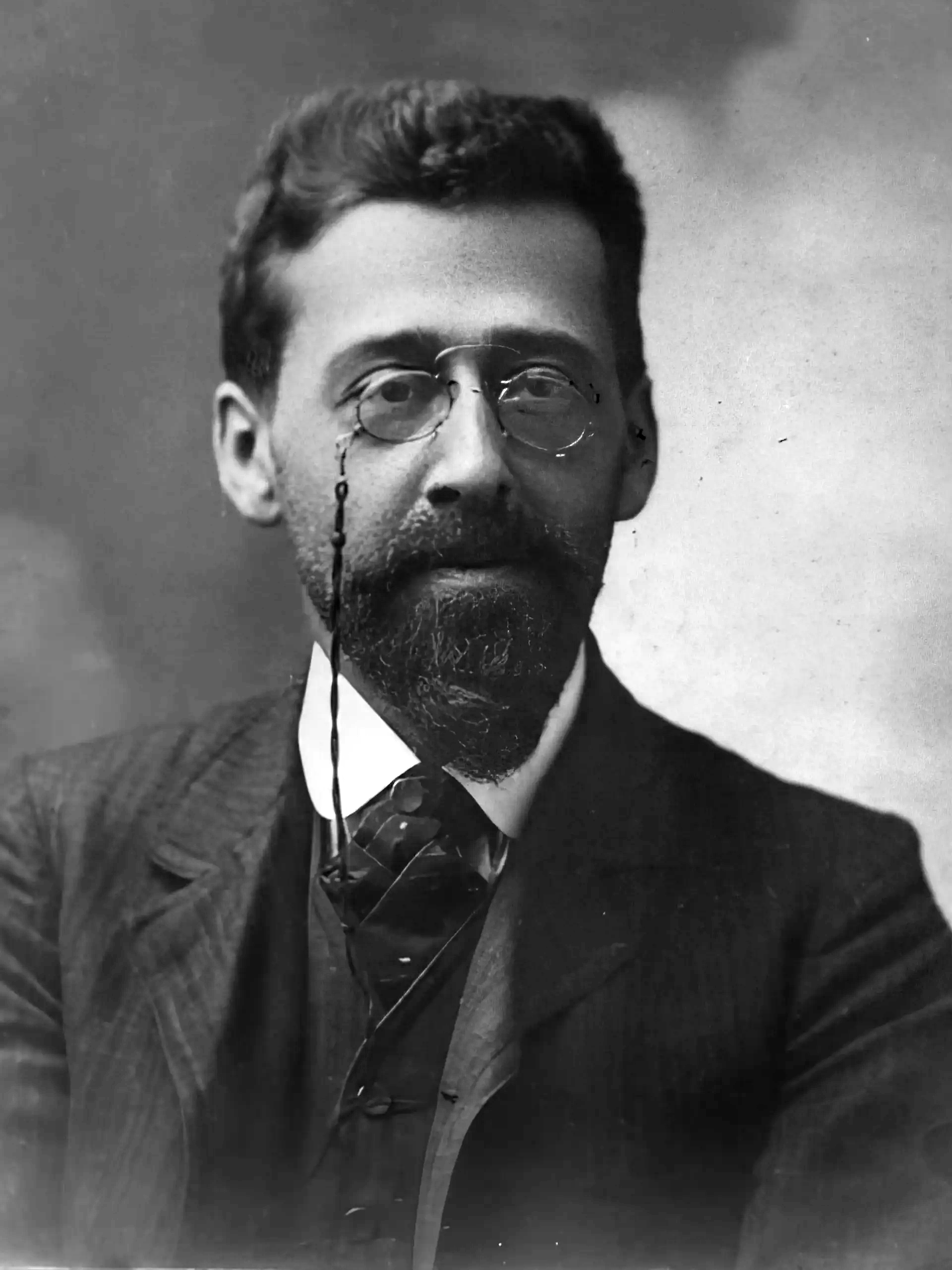

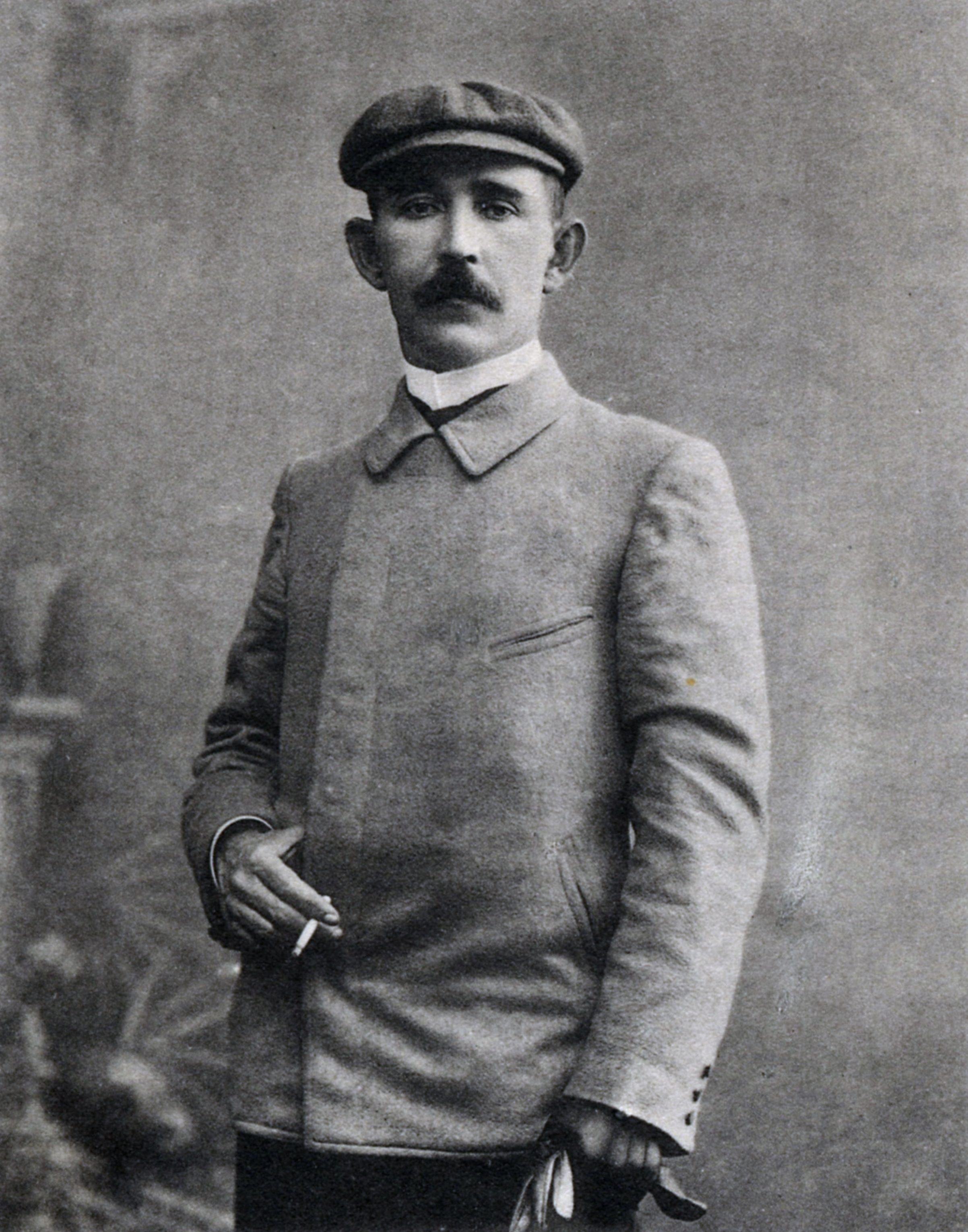
| | Majority party | Minority party | Third party |
|---|---|---|---|
| Leader | Alexander Guchkov | Pavel Milyukov | Ivan Yefryemov |
| Party | Octobrist | Kadet | Progressists |
| Last election | 154 | 54 | 28 (Note: As the Party of Peaceful Renovation) |
| Seats won | 98 | 59 | 48 |
| | Fourth party | Fifth party |
| Leader | Julius Martov | Aleksei Aladin |
| Party | RSDLP | Trudoviks |
| Last election | 19 | 14 |
| Seats won | 14 | 10 |
Chairman before election
Mikhail Rodzianko
Union of October 17
Chairman-designate
Mikhail Rodzianko
Union of October 17

Legislative elections were held in the Russian Empire in September 1912 to elect the 442 members of the fourth State Duma.

== Electoral Process ==
The elections to the fourth State Duma were conducted on Electoral Law 1907, which were the same laws as the third State Duma had been elected under in the October 1907 Russian legislative election.

== Results ==
Around 51% of those elected were nobles, the highest during the Tsarist era. Both the right- and left-wing increased their representation in the Duma; right-wing candidates won 153 seats and left-wingers 152, whilst the centrists, including the Union of October 17, were reduced to 130 seats.

1912 Russian legislative election
| Party | Seats |
|---|---|
| Russian Nationalist | 120 |
| Union of October 17 | 98 |
| Extreme Rightist | 65 |
| Constitutional Democratic Party | 59 |
| Progressive Party | 48 |
| Minority Autonomists | 21 |
| Russian Social Democratic Labour Party | 14 |
| Trudoviks | 10 |
| Independents | 7 |
| Total | 442 |

== Aftermath ==
Following the elections, the Union of October 17 became an opposition party due to its harassment by the government during the election.

== See also ==
- History of Russia (1894–1917)
- Russian Revolution of 1905
- Coup of June 1907
- Stolypin reforms
- Vyborg Manifesto
- October Manifesto
- Electoral college
- Zemstvo
- United Nobility
- Electoral Law 1907
