= All-Russian Teachers' Union =

The All-Russian Teachers' Union (Vserossiiskii soiuz uchitelei, or VUS) was a trade union for teachers founded in the 1890s and active during the Russian revolutions of 1917. It was dissolved in December 1918 following conflict with the Bolsheviks.

== Conflict with Bolsheviks ==
After the Bolshevik seizure of power in the October Revolution, the VUS went on strike along with officials of the Ministry of Education and the State Education Committee. The Petrograd branch of the VUS resolved "not to perform the instructions of the self-styled power." They stayed out on strike until 6 January 1918. The Moscow branch, with around 4000 members, joined the strike of municipal workers, and remained on strike until 11 March 1918. The Bolsheviks claimed that the VUS was receiving financial backing from Pavel Ryabushinsky. Anatoly Lunacharsky commented in Petrogradskii uchitel:

'We are obliged to dismiss for ever from school activity these honourable gentlemen who, in spite of our appeal, prefer to continue in the role of political matadors rather than the role of teachers.
'I do not know what quantity of repentant tears the individual teachers may, in the eyes of the people, wash away the black letters which he himself has painted on his forehead: "In December 1917, in the hour of the people's terrible struggle against the exploiters, I refused to teach the children and received money for this from the exploiters' funds."
