= Tauride Garden =

Park in Saint Petersburg, Russia

Coordinates: 59°56′45″N 30°22′26″E

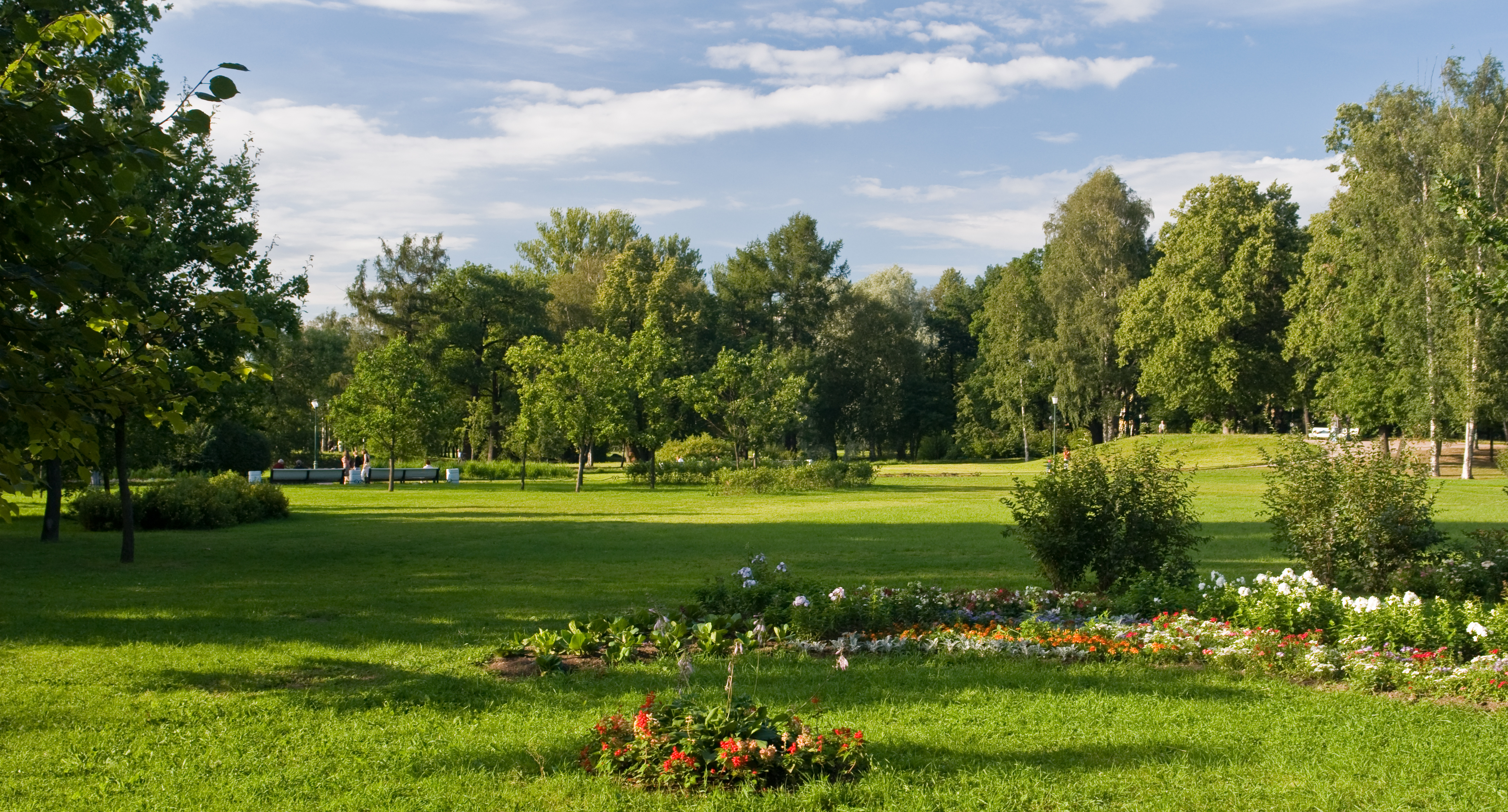
The lawns of the Tauride Garden

The Tauride Garden (Russian: Таврический сад) is a park in the Tsentralny District of Saint Petersburg, Russia. It is located behind the Tauride Palace, and near the Smolny Cathedral.

== History ==
The garden was laid out between 1783 and 1789. Prince Grigory Potemkin ordered his favourite architect, William Guld, to design and lay out the park. When Potemkin died in 1791, the park and palace were used by Catherine II as a residence. Afterwards it was opened to the public. In 1898, a theater was built in the park.

In 1932, it was renamed the "Park of Culture and Rest of the First Five-Year Plan", commemorating the early completion of the Soviet Union's first five-year plan for the national economy. The name "Tauride Garden" was later restored.

== Features ==
The park currently contains several sports areas, an ice skating rink, and an orangery. Some of these were created when the park was partially redesigned in the late 19th and early 20th centuries.

== Orangery ==
The orangery has many exotic plants, including peaches, watermelons, apricots, and pineapples.

== Gallery ==
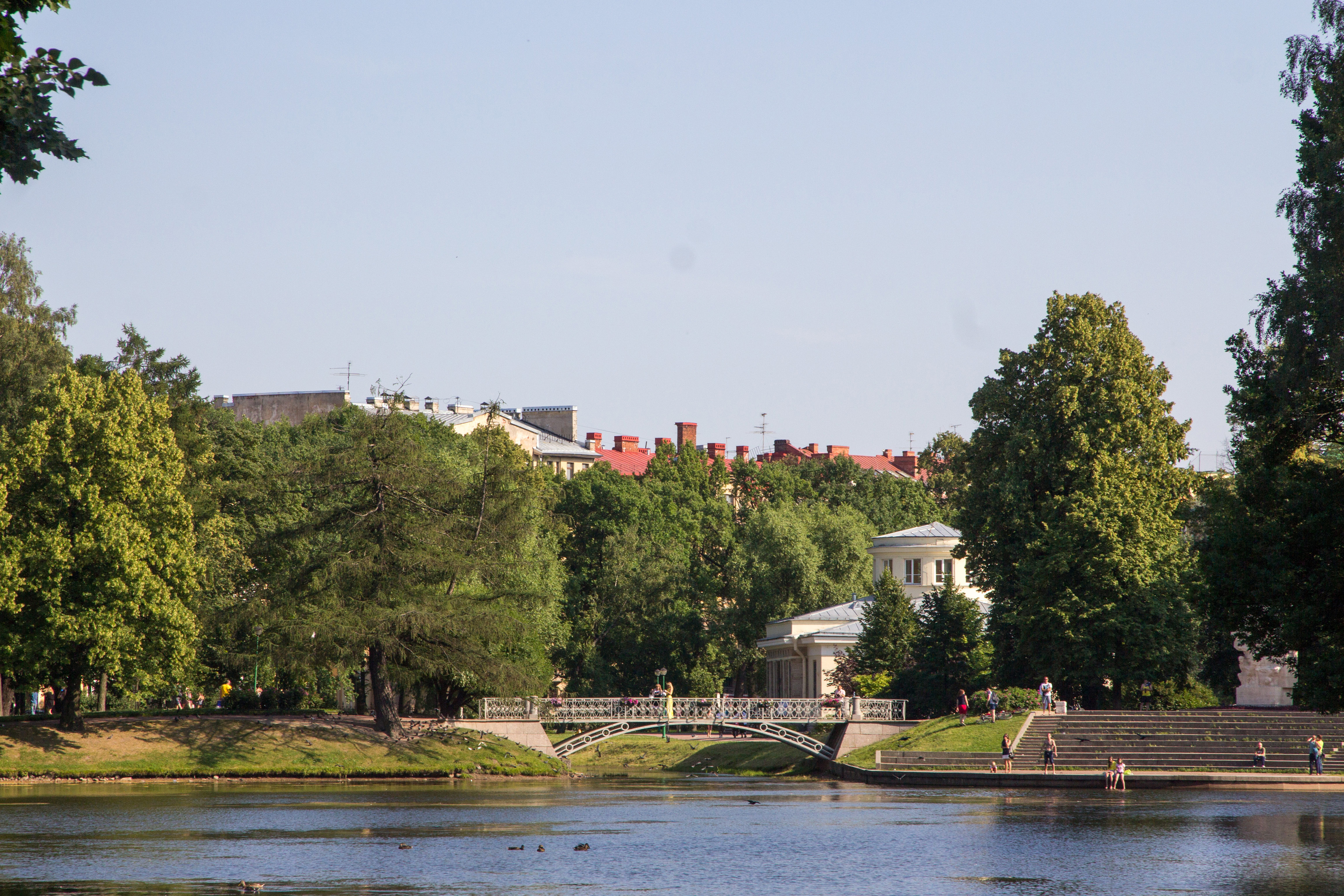
Panoramic view of Tauride Garden (2014)

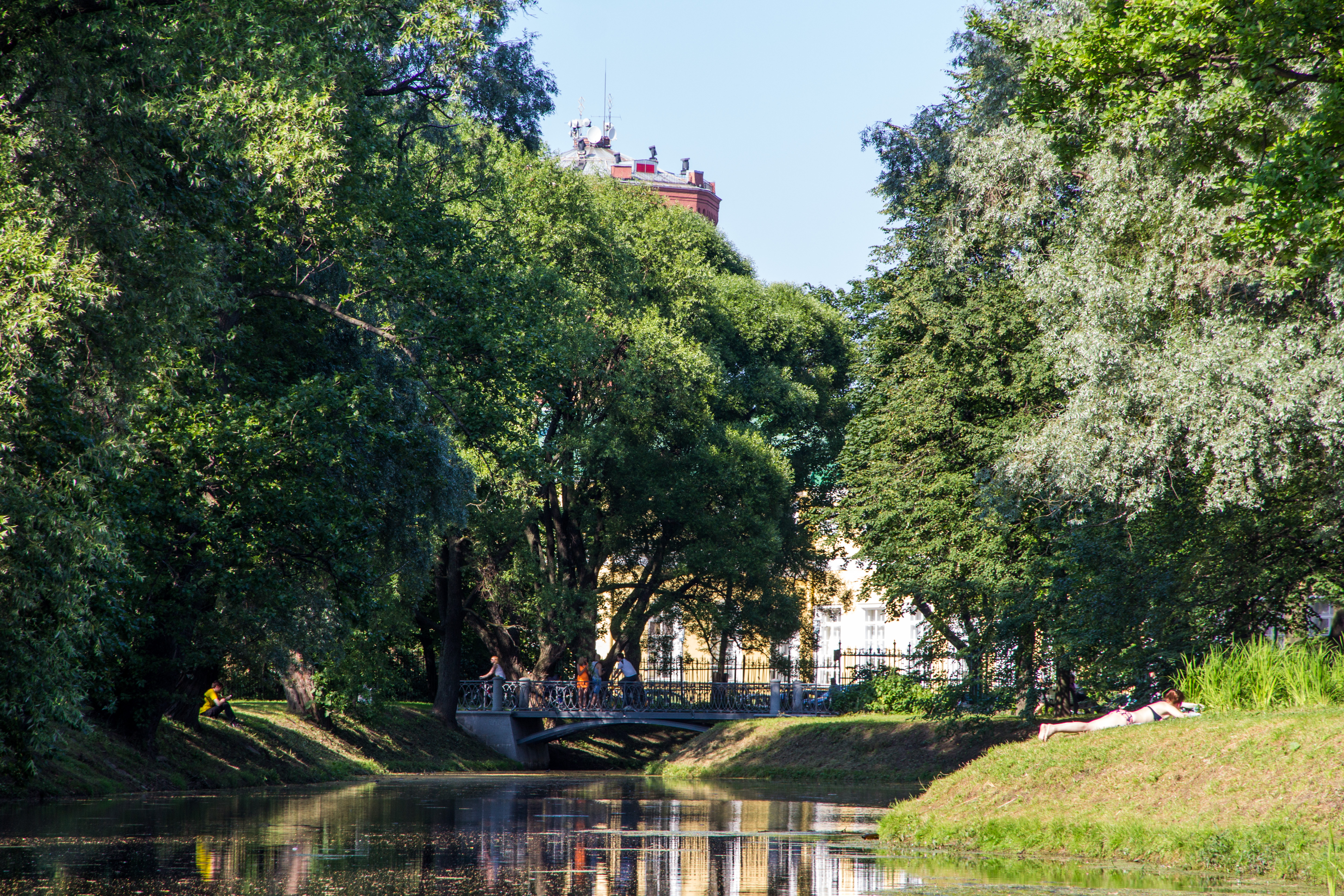
Panoramic view of Tauride Garden (2014)

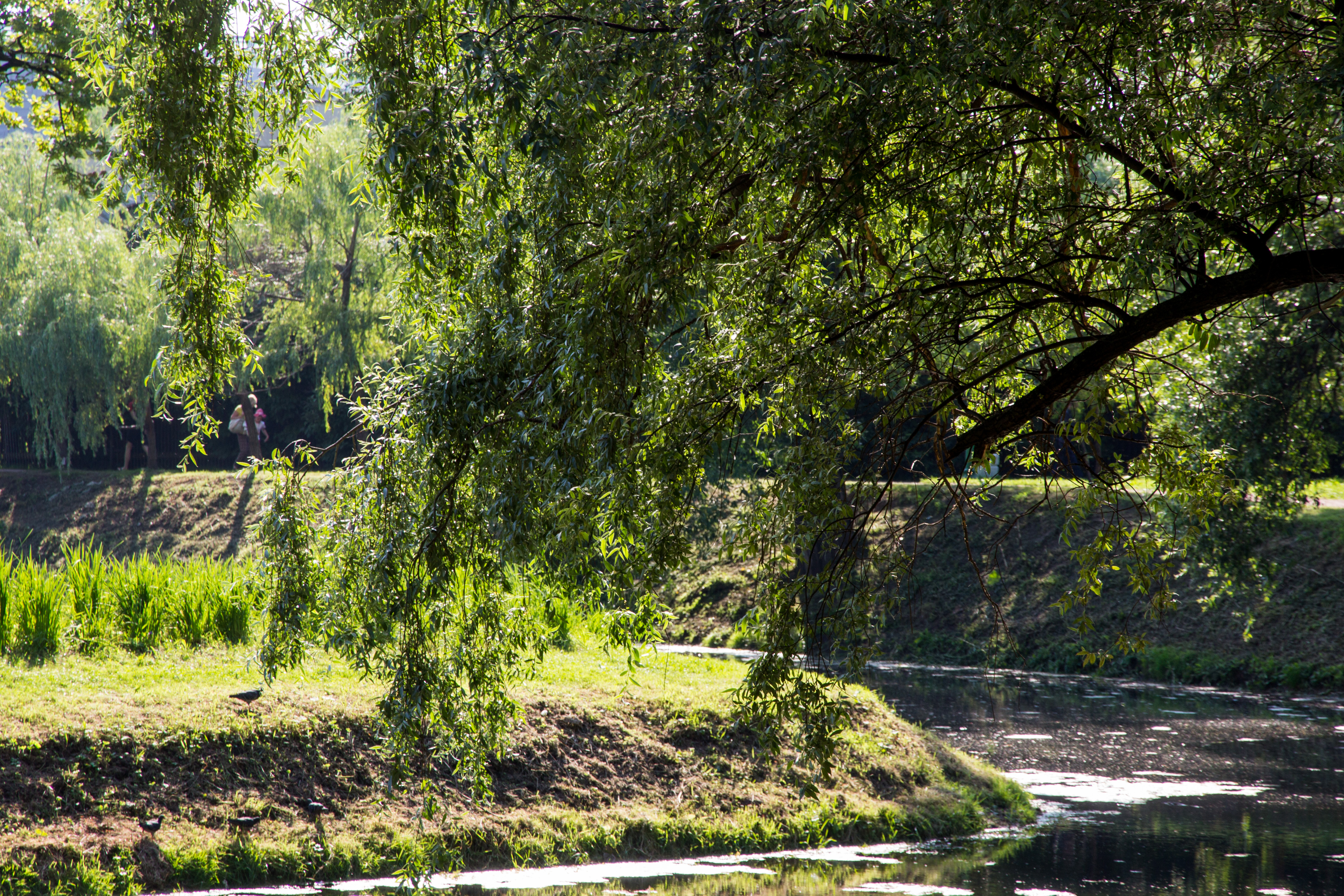
Panoramic view of Tauride Garden (2014)

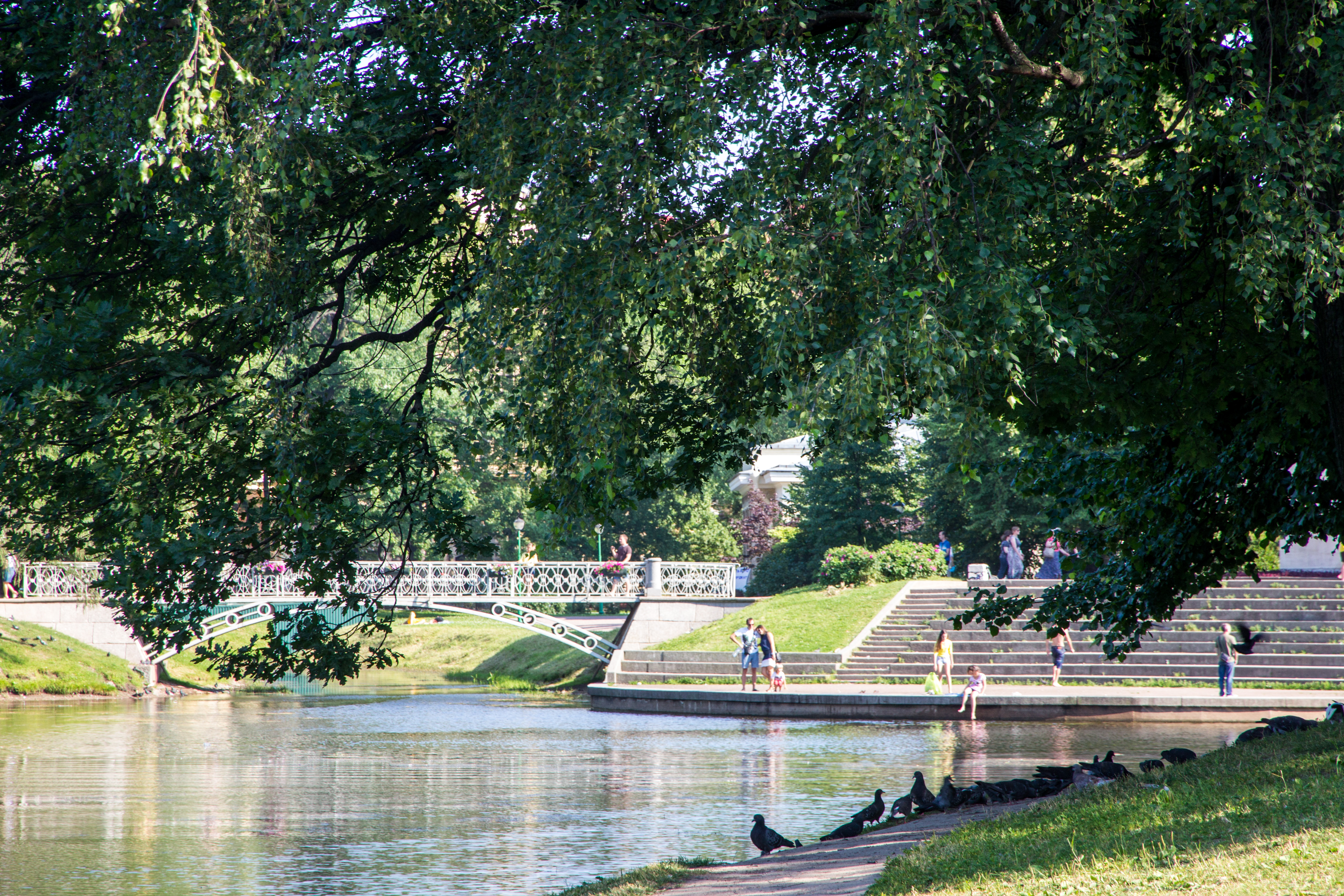
Panoramic view of Tauride Garden (2014)

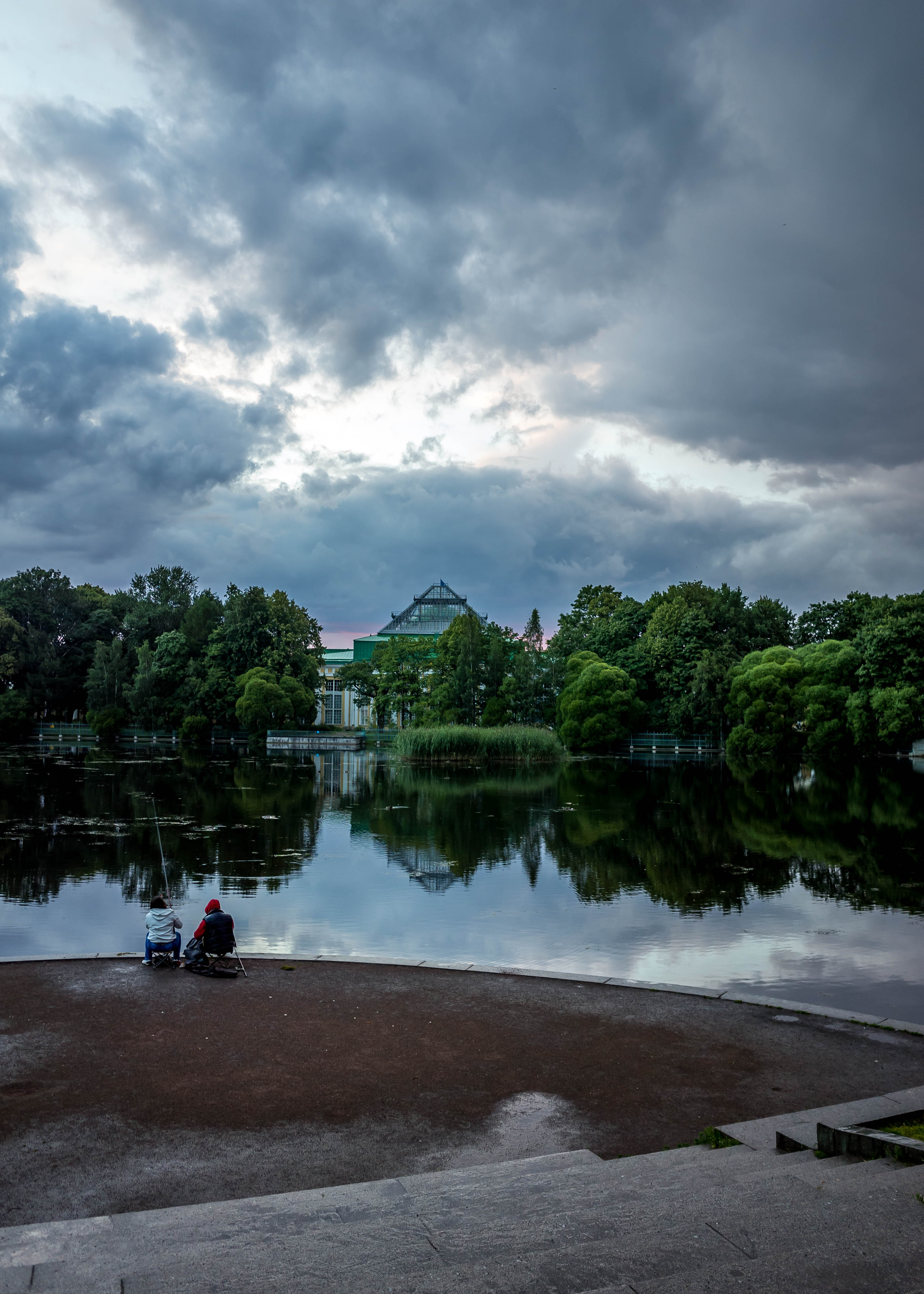
Fishing by the pond of the Tauride gardens (2014)

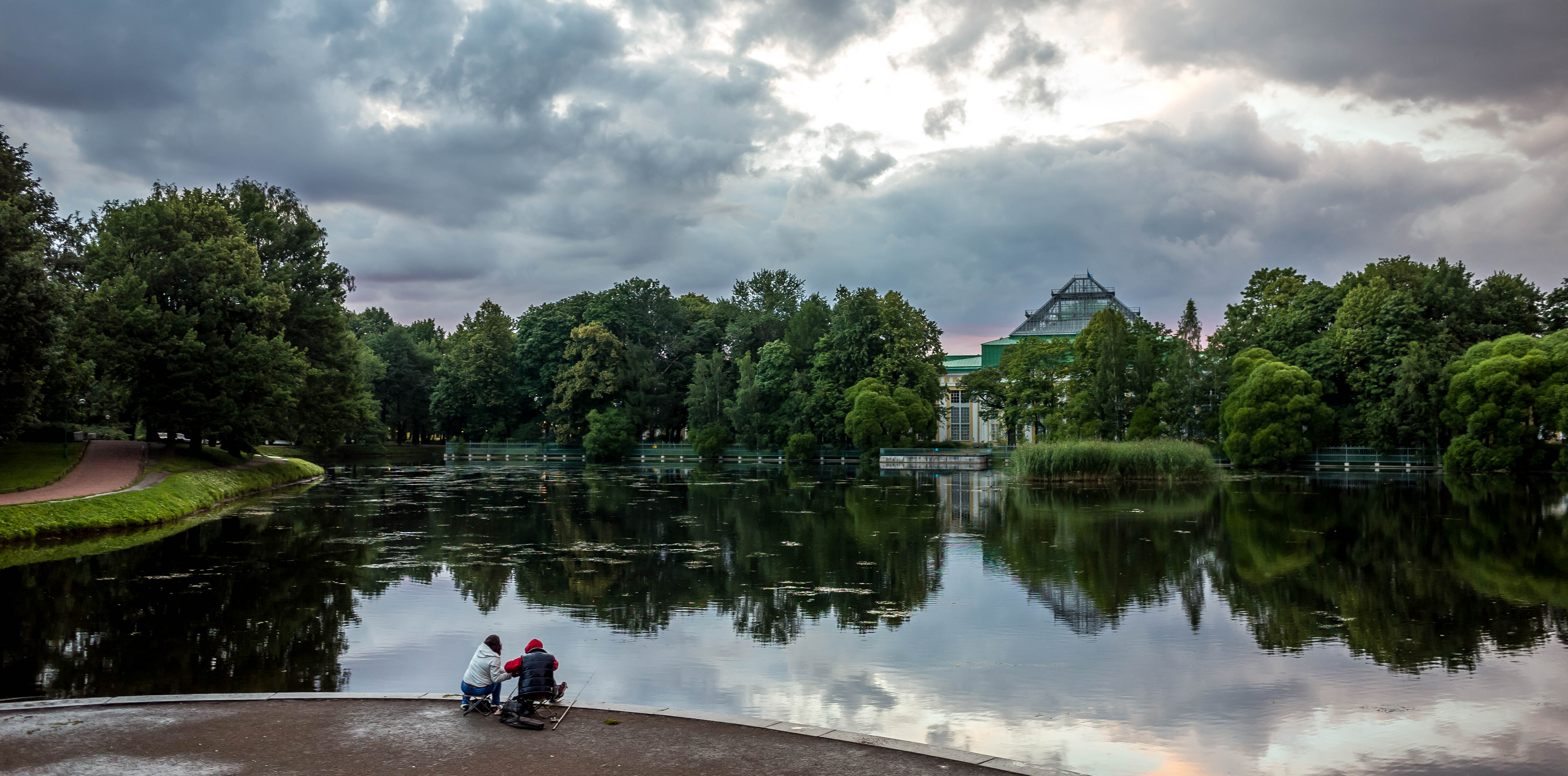
Fishing by the pond of the Tauride gardens (2014)

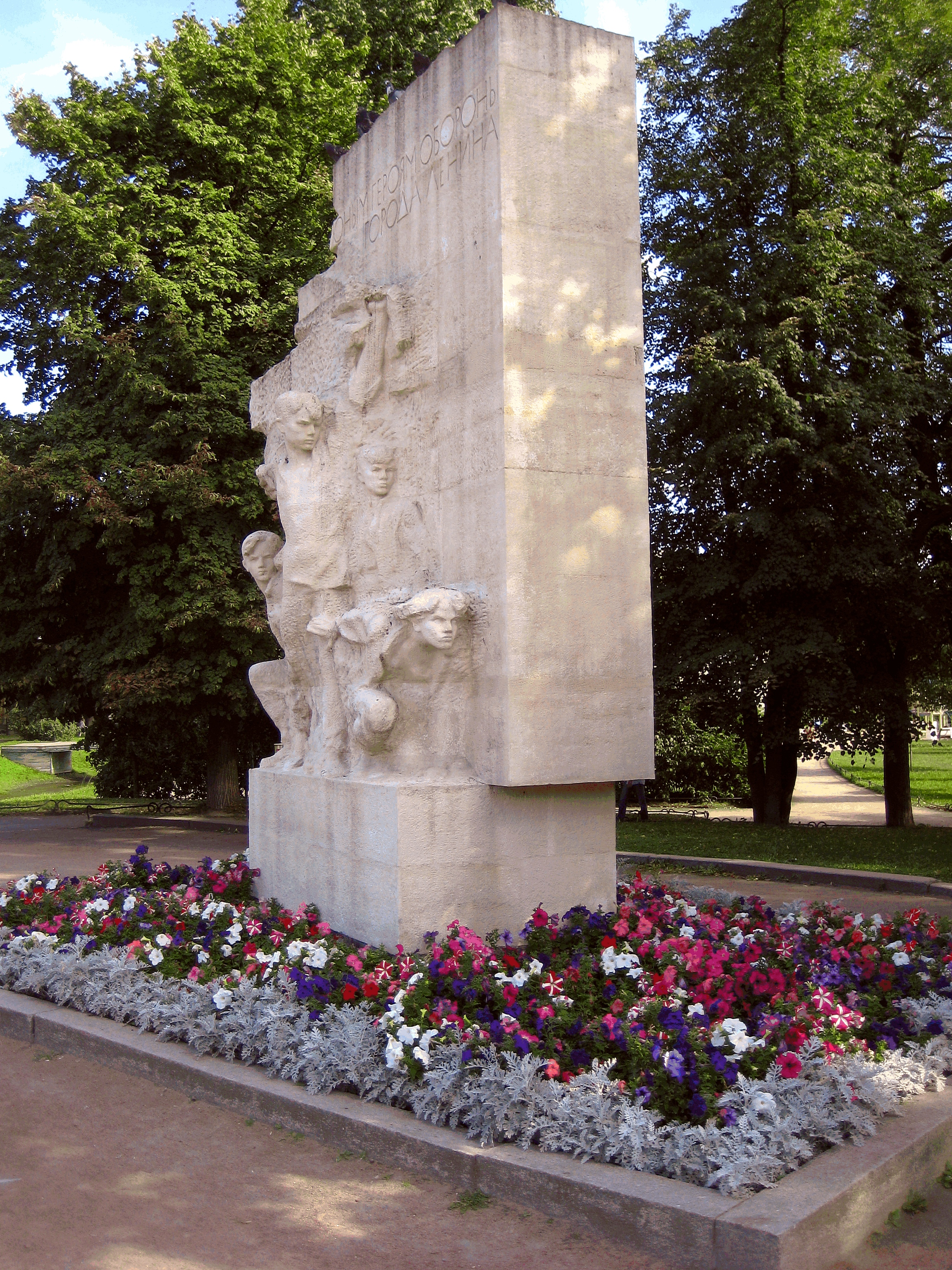
Monument to the Pioneer-Heroes in the Tauride Garden (2013)

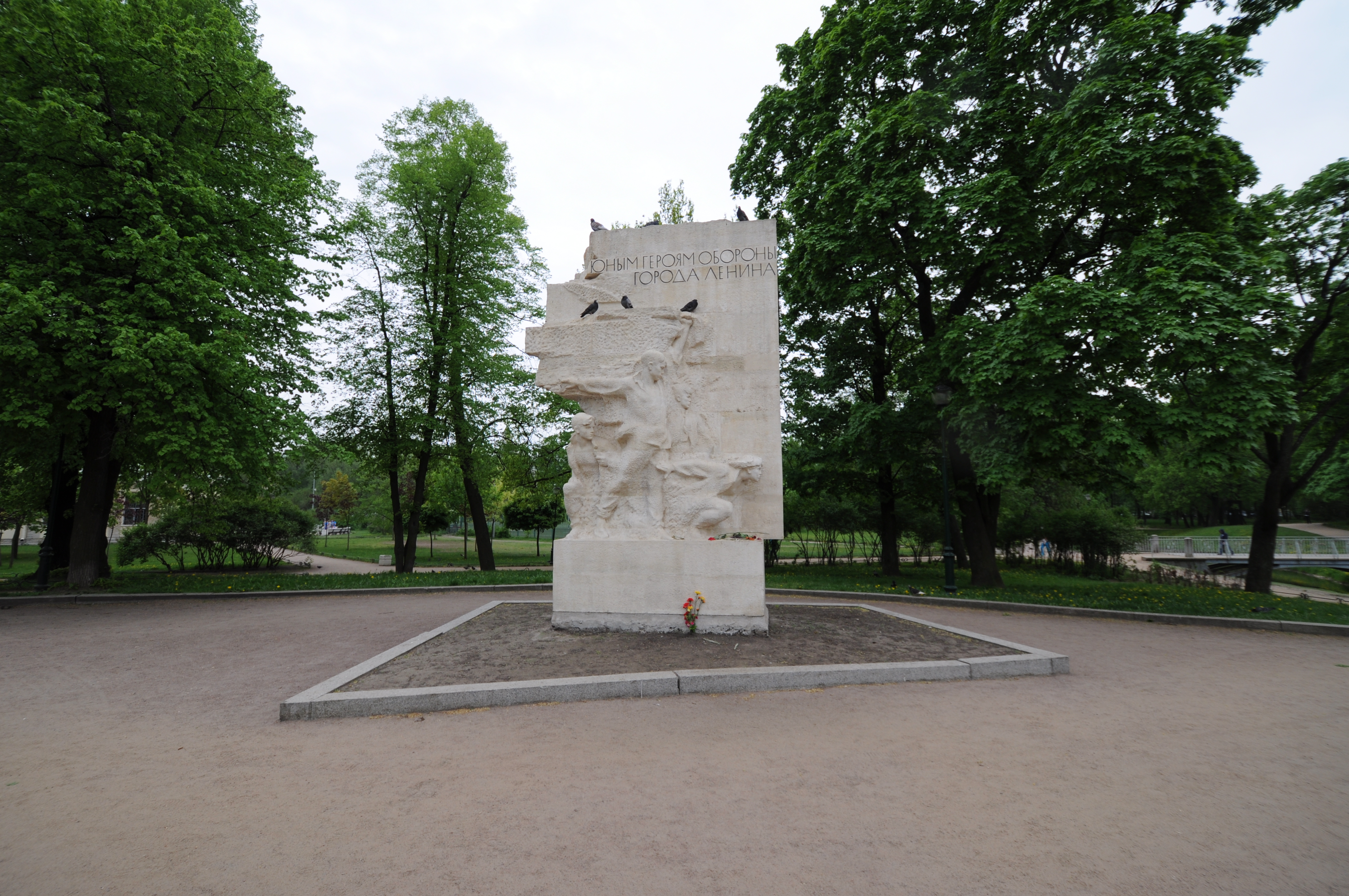
Monument to the Pioneer-Heroes in the Tauride Garden (2016)

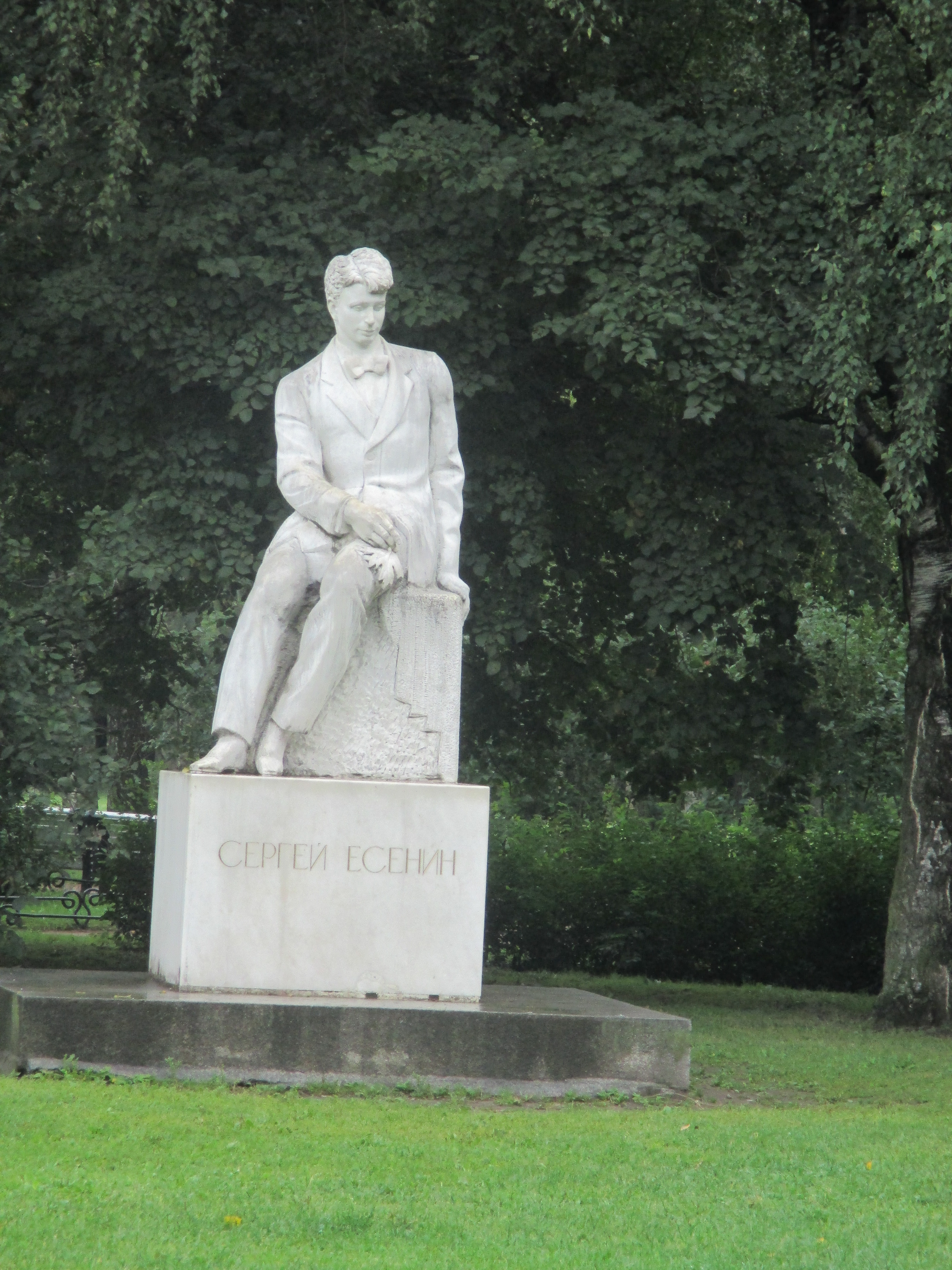
Yesenin Monument, Tauride Garden (2014)
