= Yesenin Monument =

Monument in Tauride Garden, Saint Petersburg, Russia

- Памятник Есенину
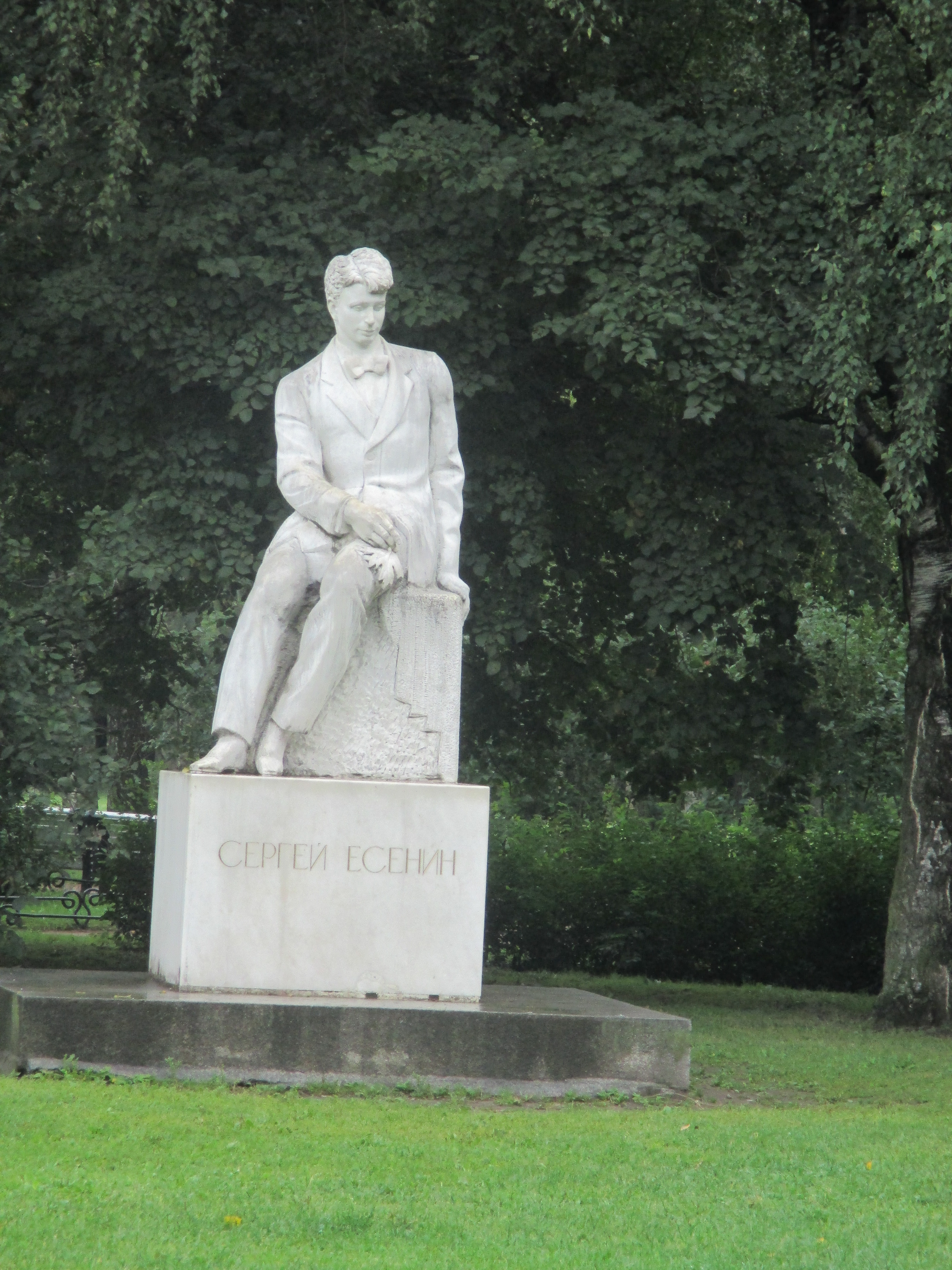
- Interactive map of Yesenin Monument
- Location: Tauride Garden in Saint Petersburg, Russia
- Coordinates: 59°56′40″N 30°22′09″E
- Designer: Albert Charkin
- Type: Sedentary
- Material: Marble
- Opening date: 3 October 1995
- Dedicated to: Russian poet Sergei Yesenin

The Yesenin Monument (Russian: памятник Есенину) is a sculpture in the Tauride Garden in the centre of Saint Petersburg, Russia. Made of white marble and set on a small pedestal, it represents the Russian poet Sergei Yesenin seated in a thoughtful pose.

The monument has been subjected to several attacks by vandals. It has been painted, and had its nose and fingers removed. After it was damaged a fourth time in 2009, the decision was made to make it less accessible, although it remains in its original location.
