= Tauride Palace =

Palace in Saint Petersburg, Russia

Coordinates: 59°56′52″N 30°22′33″E

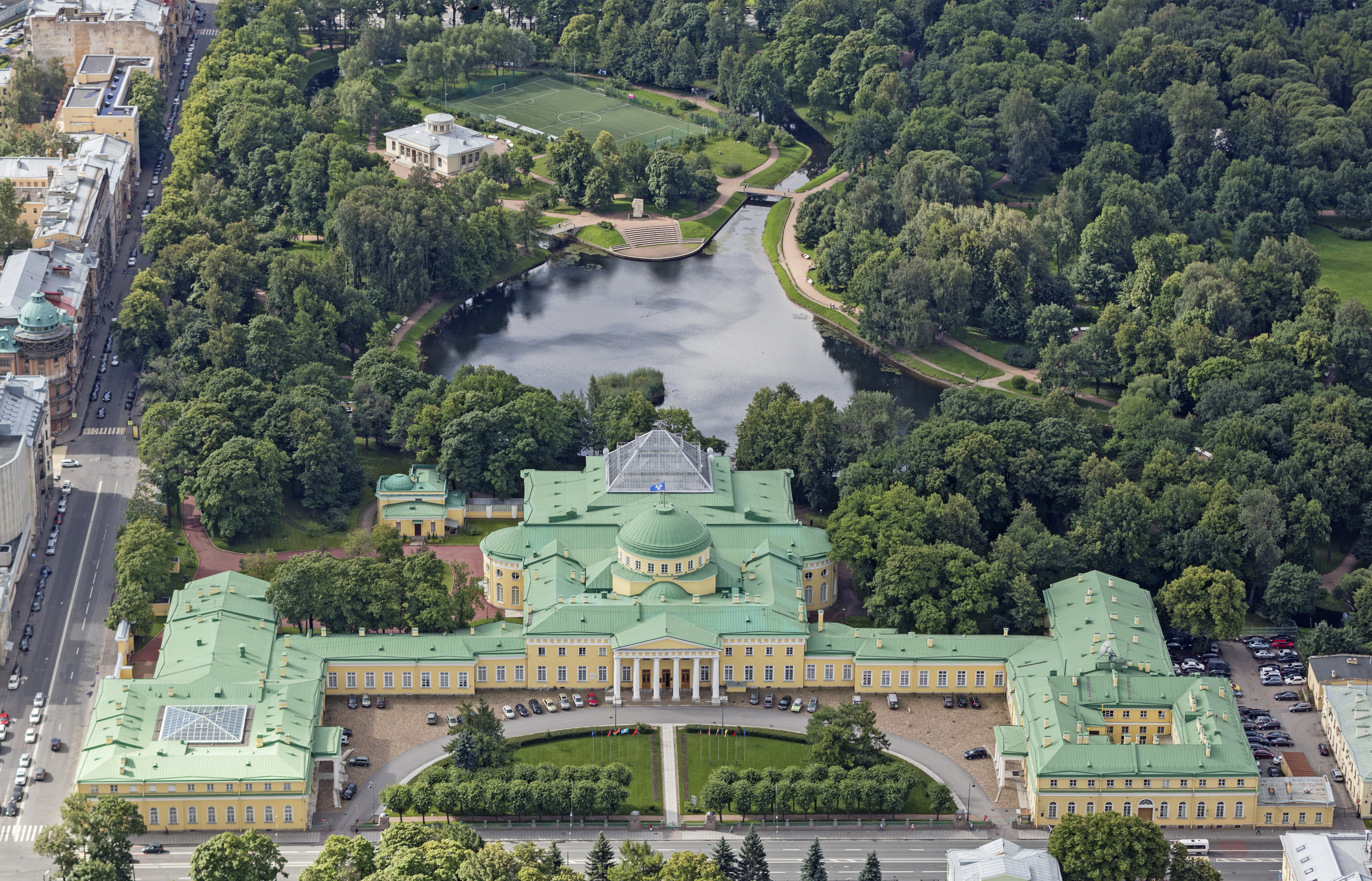
Aerial view of Tauride Palace and Tauride Garden in 2016

Tauride Palace (Russian: Таврический дворец, romanized: Tavrichesky dvorets) is one of the largest and most historically important palaces in Saint Petersburg, Russia.

== Construction and early use ==
Prince Grigory Potemkin of Tauride commissioned his favourite architect, Ivan Starov, to design his city residence in a rigorous Palladian style. Starov's design called for an extensive park, later the Tauride Garden, and harbour in front of the palace, which would be linked with the Neva River by a canal. Building work began in 1783 and lasted for six years. The 13-bay front of the palace has a Tuscan portico and is topped by a shallow dome. A square vestibule leads to an octagonal hall, with the huge "Catherine Hall" beyond. This had eighteen Ionic Greek columns on either side and opens into a large, enclosed winter garden with a central circular colonnade. Considered the grandest nobleman's residence of 18th-century Russia, Tauride Palace served as a model for innumerable manors scattered across the Russian Empire.

Shortly before his death, on 28 April 1791, Potemkin used the palace to host unprecedented festivities and illuminations with the purpose of winning the Empress's waning affections. The ball was described by Gavrila Derzhavin in the longest of his poetry compositions.

== Imperial acquisition and use ==
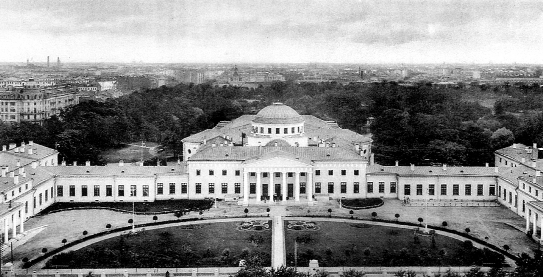
Tauride Palace and Gardens in the early 20th century

Several months after the owner's death, Catherine II purchased his palace and ordered the architect Fyodor Volkov to transform it into her summer townhouse. Volkov was responsible for many improvements in the grounds, including the construction of the theatre in the east wing and the church in the west wing. In the garden, he designed the Admiralty Pavilion, the gardener house, orangery, glass-houses, bridges, and ironwork fences. The sculpture named the Venus Tauride (now in the Hermitage Museum) was kept in the palace from the end of the eighteenth century until the mid-nineteenth, and derives its name from it.

The exterior appearance of the palace was rather plain and contrasted sharply with the riotous luxuriance of its interiors. The domed hall, one of the largest in Russia, was connected by a 75-metre-long (246 ft) columned gallery with a winter garden. The decoration of every major room – including the Chinese Hall and the Tapestry Parlour – was destroyed after 1799, when Emperor Paul, who detested all the things his mother liked, gave over the palace to his favourite cavalry regiment to be used as stables and barracks.

In the 19th century, the palace was refurbished by Carlo Rossi and Vasily Stasov as a residence for minor royalty. It was then used to host balls and exhibitions until 1906, when it was transformed into the seat of the first Russian parliament, the Imperial State Duma.

== Use during the Russian revolution ==
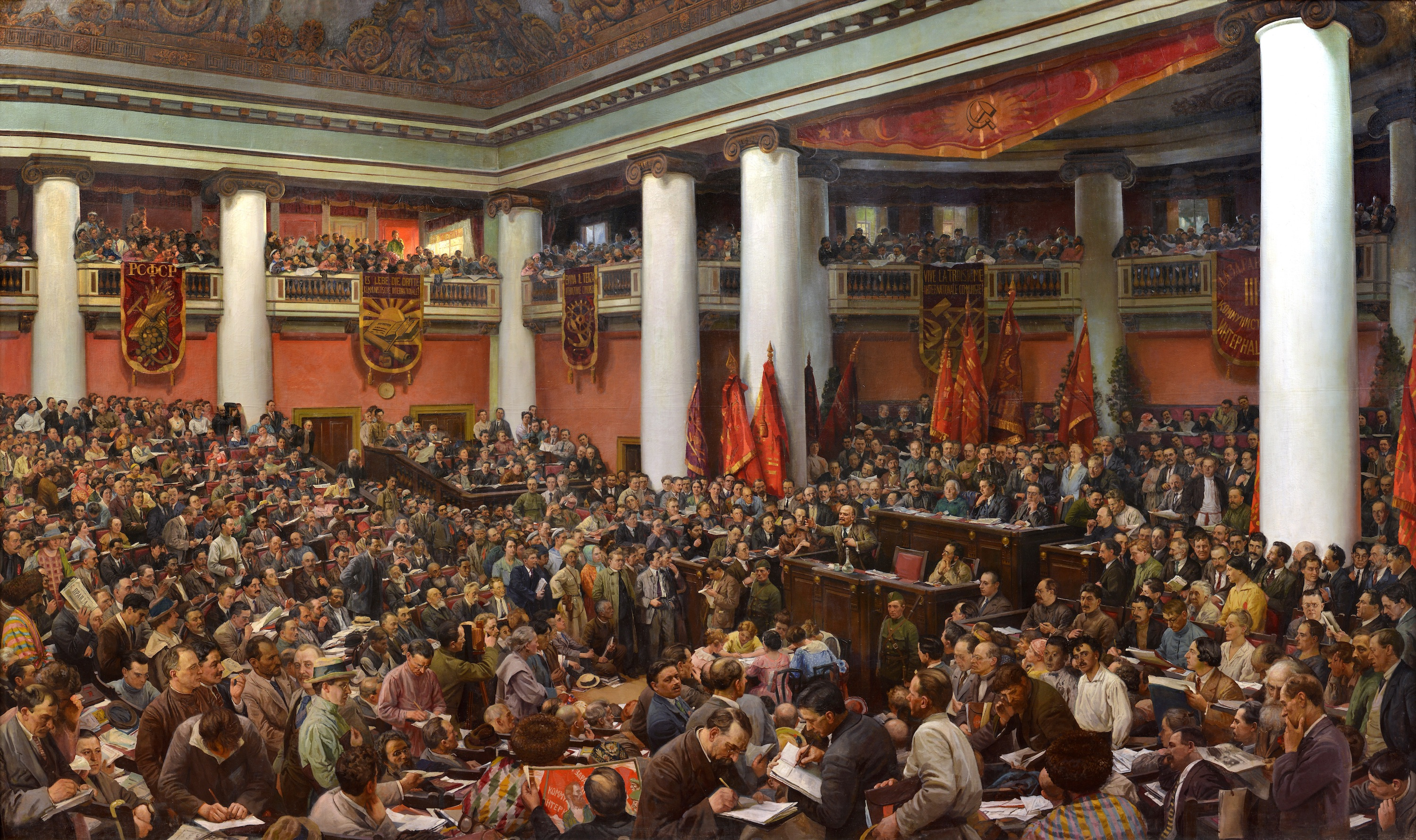
Lenin addresses the 2nd World Congress of the Comintern; 1924 painting by Isaak Brodsky

Immediately after the February Revolution of 1917, Tauride Palace housed the Russian Provisional Government and the Petrograd Soviet, in opposite wings of the palace. (In early March the Provisional Government moved to the Marinsky Palace.) The abortive Russian Constituent Assembly held its meetings there in 1918. In May 1918 Bolsheviks used the building to hold their 7th Congress, where they first named themselves the Russian Communist Party (Bolsheviks).

== Post-revolutionary uses ==
From 1920 to 1991, the Tauride Palace was used for the High Party School. Since the 1990s, Tauride Palace has been home to the Interparliamentary Assembly of Member Nations of the Commonwealth of Independent States (IPA CIS). On this account, a large glass-covered annex was erected immediately behind the palace, in the Tauride Gardens.

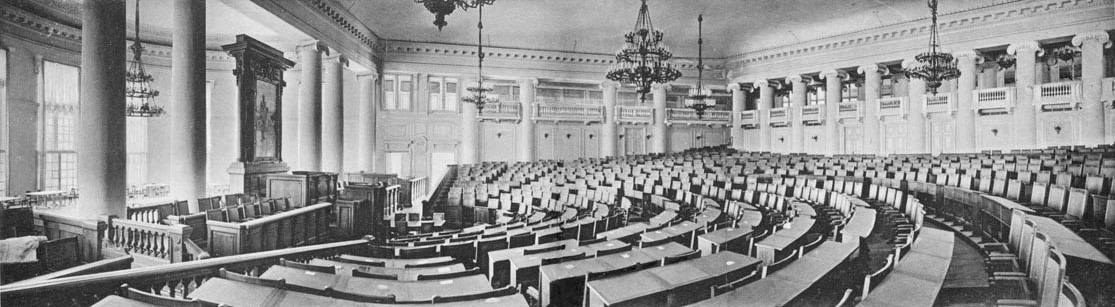
Convention Hall of the first Russian parliament, pre-revolution image (modern image).
