= Aleksandr Konovalov (politician) =

Russian textile manufacturer and liberal politician

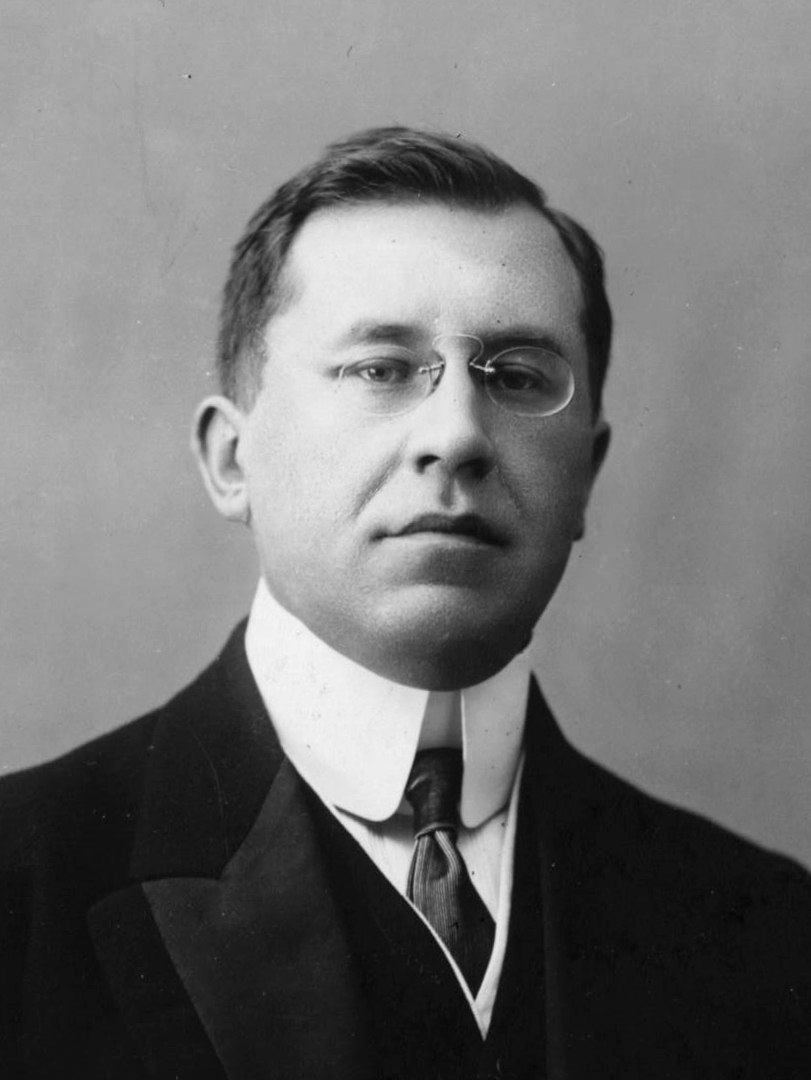
Aleksandr Konovalov.

Aleksandr Ivanovich Konovalov (Russian: Алекса́ндр Ива́нович Конова́лов) (17 September 1875, Moscow – 28 January 1949, Paris, France; Sainte-Geneviève-des-Bois Cemetery) was a Russian Kadet politician and entrepreneur. One of Russia's biggest textile manufacturers, he became a leader of the liberal, business-oriented Progressist Party and was a member of the Progressive Bloc in the Fourth Duma.

== Biography ==
During World War I he was vice president of Alexander Guchkov's Military-Industrial Committee, and after the February Revolution he became Minister of Trade and Industry in the Provisional Government. He was an active member of the irregular freemasonic lodge, the Grand Orient of Russia’s Peoples. After the October Revolution he emigrated to France, where he was a leader of leftist Russian émigrés; at the start of World War II he moved to the United States.
