= Progressive Party (Russia) =

Progressive Party Прогрессивная партия
- Leader: Aleksandr Konovalov; Ivan Efremov
- Founded: 1912
- Dissolved: 1917
- Preceded by: Party of Peaceful Renovation
- Ideology: Classical liberalism Conservative liberalism Constitutional monarchism
- Political position: Centre-right

The Progressive Party (Russian: Прогрессивная партия), also known as the Progressists (Russian: прогрессисты), was a group of moderate Russian liberals organized in 1912. It had 25 deputies in the Third Duma and 48 in the Fourth. Its most prominent members were Ivan Efremov, Aleksandr Konovalov, and Pavel Ryabushinsky. In the last two Dumas, the Progressists entered into a coalition with the Constitutional Democrats, and in the Fourth Duma, they were part of the Progressive Bloc. After the February Revolution, Efremov and Konovalov became part of the Provisional Government.
