= List of defunct newspapers of Russia =

This is a list of defunct newspapers of Russia.

- Chronicle of Current Events
- Golos Truda
- Irkutskoye Slovo
- Kuranty
- Luch
- Moskovskiye Vedomosti
- Novaya Zhizn (1905)
- Novaya Zhizn (1917–1918)
- Noviye Sily
- Rabochy
- Rech
- Rodnaya Zemlya
- Rus (1903)
- Sbornik Sotsial-Demokrata
- Sevodnya (1906)
- Strakhovaniye Rabochikh
- Student (publication)
- Ternii Truda
- Tovarishch (newspaper)
- Zhivoye Delo
- Znamya (1902?–1903?)
- Znamya Trudovoi Kommuny (1918)
