= January 1907 Russian legislative election =

- January 1907

All 518 seats in the State Duma 260 seats needed for a majority
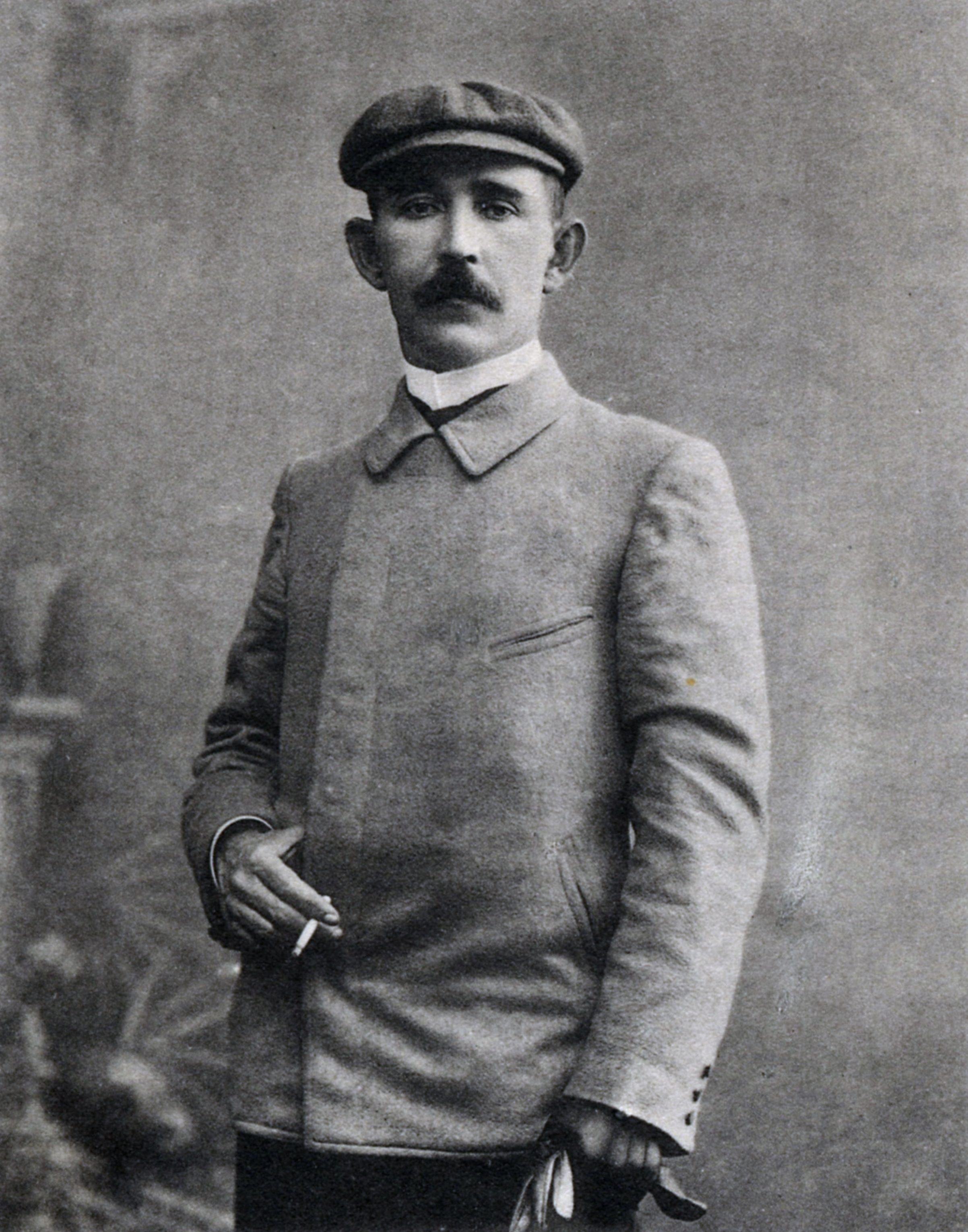

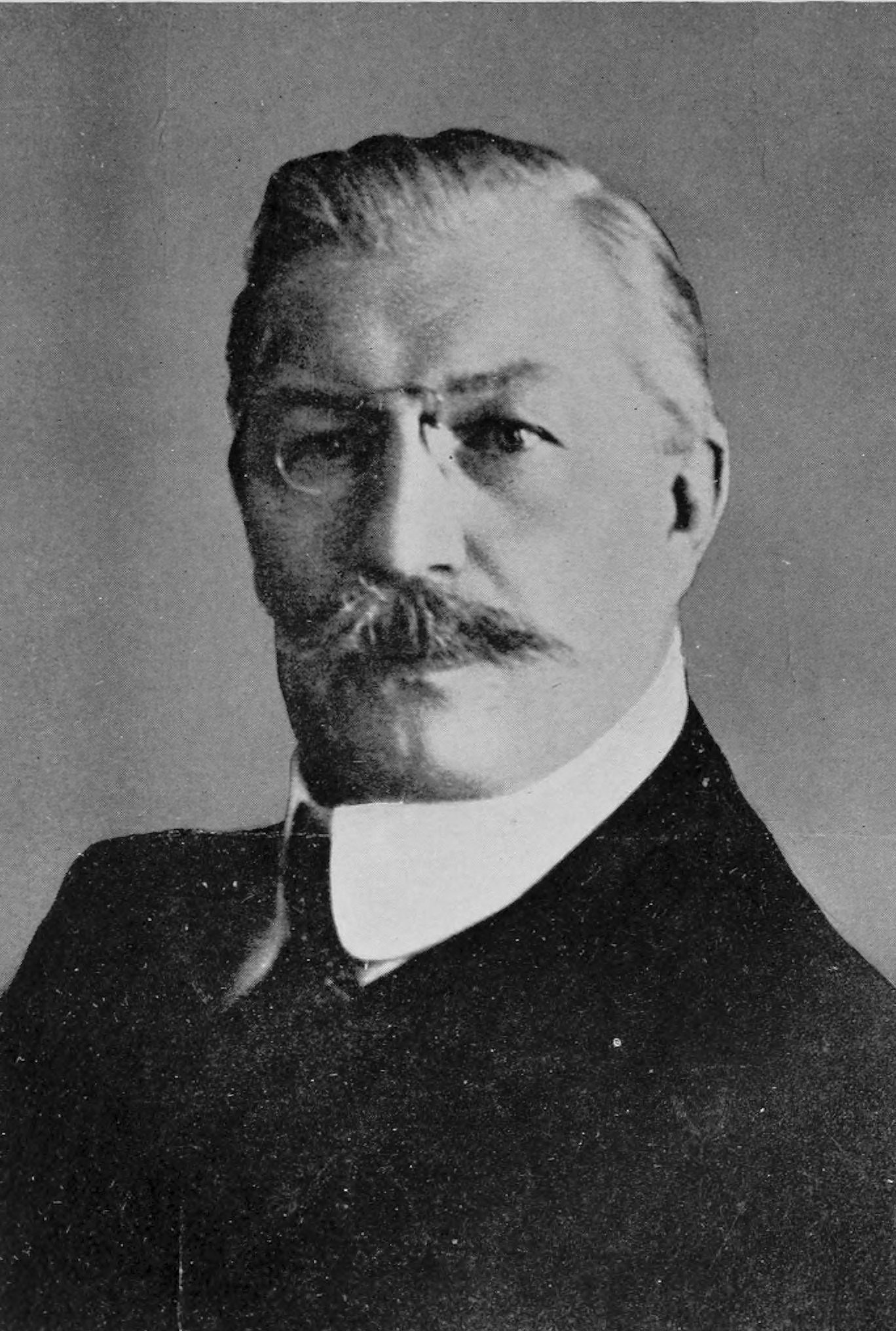

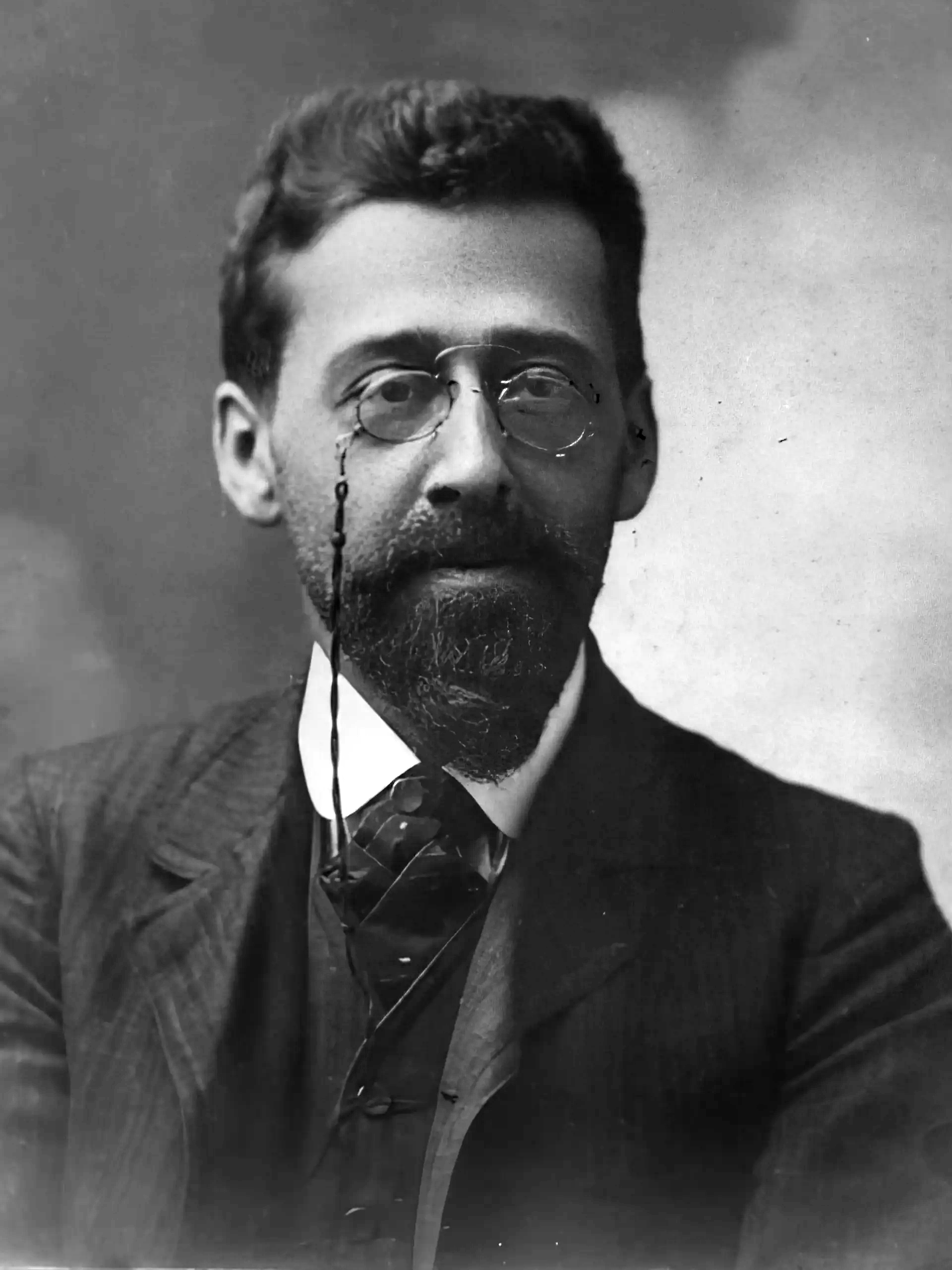

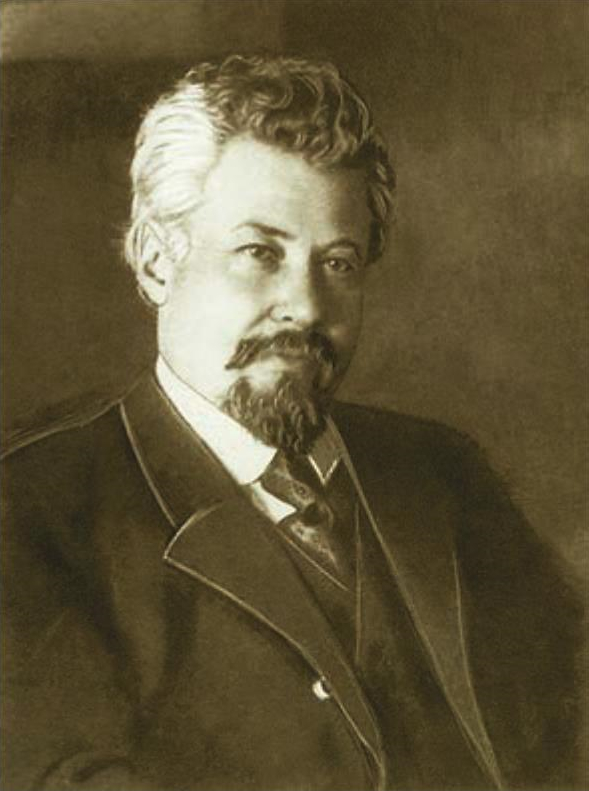

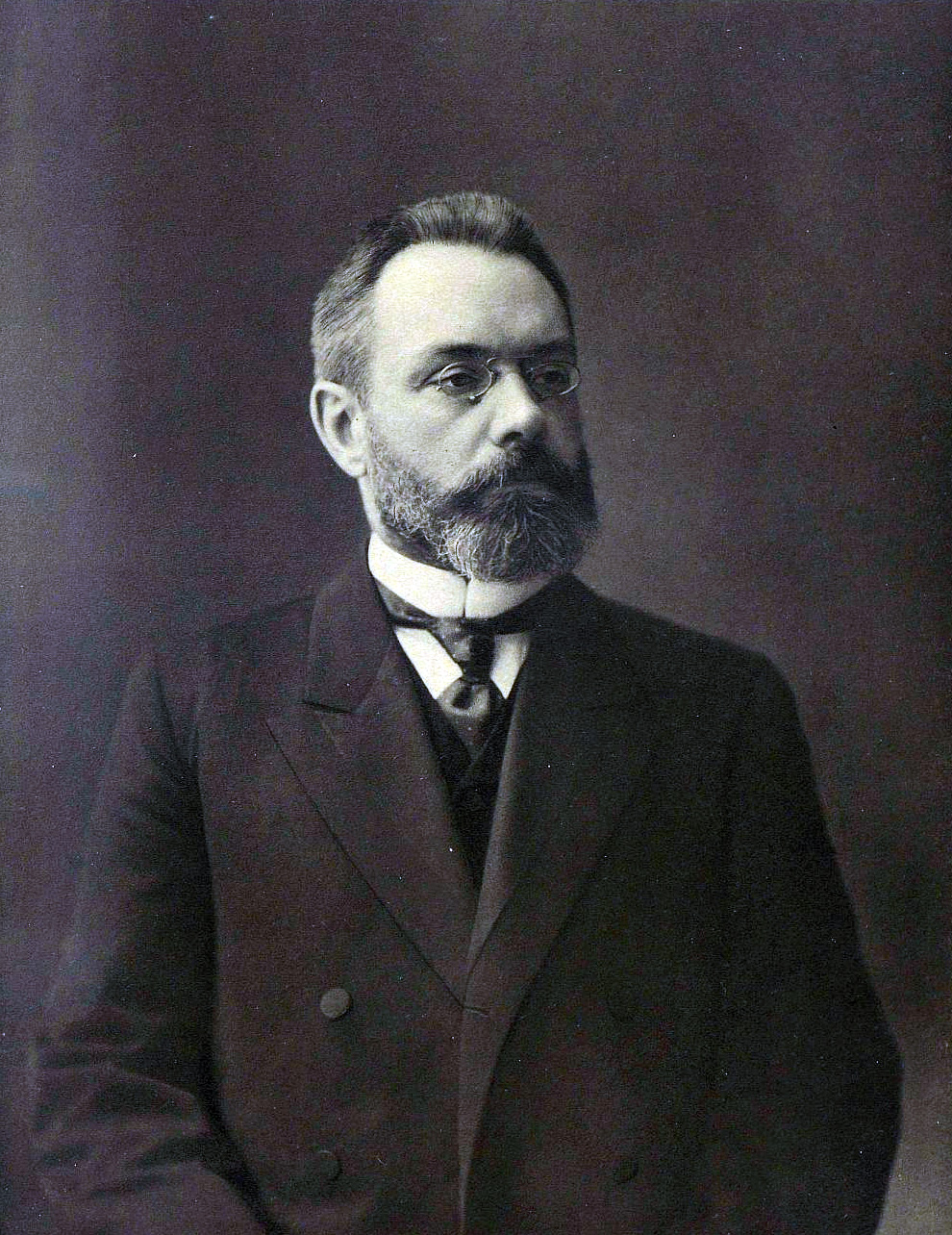

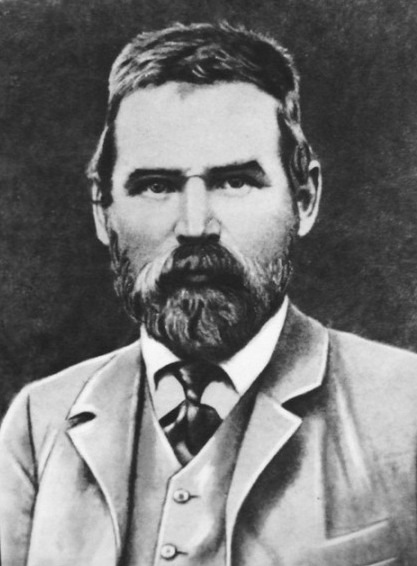
	Majority party	Minority party	Third party
Leader	Alexey Aladyin	Pavel Milyukov	Julius Martov
Party	Trudoviks	Kadets	RSDLP
Seats won	104	98	65
	Fourth party	Fifth party	Sixth party
Leader	Viktor Chernov	Alexander Guchkov	Alexey Peshekhonov
Party	SRs	Octobrist	Popular Socialists
Seats won	37	32	16
Chairman before election
Sergey Muromtsev
Kadets
Chairman-designate
Fyodor Golovin
Kadets

Legislative elections were held in the Russian Empire between 21 January and 1 March 1907. The Trudoviks emerged as the largest bloc in the second State Duma, winning 104 of the 518 seats. Only 26 MPs elected the previous year retained their seats. In Congress Poland, the National-Democratic Party won 34 of the 38 seats.

The new Duma was opened on 5 March, with Fyodor Alexandrovich Golovin elected as its president.

== Results ==
Party	Seats
Trudoviks	104
Constitutional Democratic Party	98
Autonomists	76
Russian Social Democratic Labour Party	65
Socialist Revolutionary Party	37
Moderates and Octobrists	32
Right-wing	22
Cossack Group	17
Popular Socialists	16
Party of Democratic Reform	1
Independents	50
Total	518
Source: Great Russian Encyclopaedia
