= Novy Luch =

Novy Luch (New Ray) was a Bolshevik daily political and literary newspaper published legally in St. Petersburg, Russia, from March 3 to March 12, 1907, under Lenin's editorship. The newspaper dealt with the political life of the country and the working-class movement; it sharply criticised the policies of the Mensheviks, and attacked the petty-bourgeois parties. The lead article in the first issue of the newspaper was "The Opening of the Second State Duma". Almost all issues of Novy Luch contained articles by Lenin. The Bolshevik draft resolutions for the Fifth Congress of the Party were published in Nos. 6 and 7 of Novy Luch on March 7 and March 12, 1907. After the appearance. of No. 7, the newspaper was suppressed by the tsarist government and legal action taken against its publishers.
