= Sankt-Peterburgskie Vedomosti =

Newspaper

Sankt-Peterburgskie Vedomosti Санкт-Петербургские ведомости
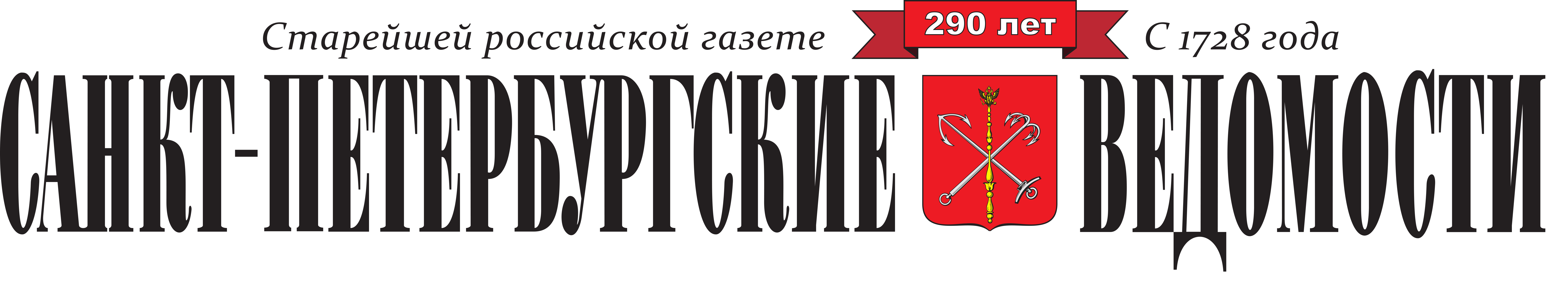
- Type: Daily newspaper
- Format: Broadsheet
- Owner: Rossiya Bank
- Founder: Peter the Great
- Publisher: SC Sankt-Peterburgskie Vedomosti Editorial House
- Editor-in-chief: Dmitry Sherikh
- Founded: 13 January 1703 (2 January, OC)
- Ceased publication: 11 November 1917 (29 October, OC)
- Relaunched: 1 September 1991
- Language: Russian
- Headquarters: 25/A, Marata Street, St. Petersburg
- Country: Russian Empire (1703-1917); Russian Republic (1917); Russian Federation (since 1991)
- Circulation: 190.000 (as of 1995)
- Website: spbvedomosti.ru

The Vedomosti (Russian: Ведомости) is Russia's oldest newspaper. It was established by Peter the Great's ukase dated 16 December 1702. The first issue appeared on 2 January 1703.

== History ==
=== Petrine Vedomosti ===
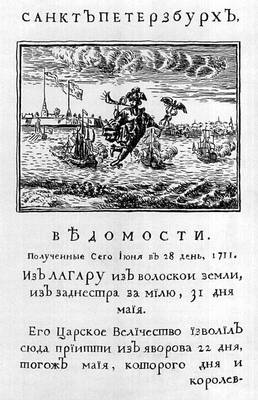
The Vedomosti, June 28, 1711.

Following along the lines of the 17th-century handwritten Kuranty, Peter's newspaper contained little other than reports of military victories and diplomatic relations, either composed by the tsar himself or translated from Dutch newspapers according to his choice.

Originally, the newspaper was published at the Print Yard in Kitai-gorod, Moscow. In 1710, engravings were introduced by way of decoration. They usually represented the Peter and Paul Fortress or the Neva River, thus reflecting the growing importance of Saint Petersburg. From 1711, most issues were printed in the Northern capital.

Peter's Vedomosti was published quite irregularly, as important news arrived — sometimes as many as seventy issues appeared annually, while other times only one was published in a year. The circulation fluctuated from several dozen copies to four thousand. In 1719, the newspaper contained 22 pages. These early issues of the Vedomosti — of which only a fraction survives — were reprinted in 1855.

=== Academic Vedomosti ===
With Peter's death in 1725, the newspaper lost its most precious contributor. As Russia offered no choice of journalists who could carry on his project, ownership of the paper was transferred to the Russian Academy of Sciences, which renamed it Sankt-Peterburgskie Vedomosti (that is, Saint Petersburg News) in 1727.

In the course of the 18th century, the academics issued the newspaper twice a week, supplementing it with extensive scholarly "commentaries", whose editors included Fedor Polikarpov-Orlov, Gerhardt Friedrich Müller, Mikhail Lomonosov, and Ippolit Bogdanovich. Since 1800, the Saint Petersburg Vedomosti was published daily.

=== 19th and 20th centuries ===
Controlled editorially by the liberal journalist Evgeny Korsh since 1863, the Vedomosti was brought to the forefront of the country's political life, as it campaigned for Europeanizing reforms and opposed the conservative stance of the semi-official Moskovskie Vedomosti. Korsh repeatedly clashed with censors over his liberal views until 1875, when he was dismissed from the editorial staff and the paper was taken over by the Imperial Ministry of Education.

After that, the newspaper's circulation and influence declined and it took the Octobrist editorial stance. Following the October Revolution, the paper was closed by the Bolsheviks on 11 November 1917 (29 October OC).

In March 1918 the new Bolshevik government launched the Communist-aligned Petrogradskaya Pravda, which was mainly formed by journalists of the Pravda that had not been transferred to Moscow after it became the new capital. Following the renaming of Petrograd into Leningrad in 1924, the paper was rebranded Leningradskaya Pravda.

== Modern relaunch ==
On 1 September 1991 the Leningradskaya Pravda was rebranded as the revived Sankt-Peterburgskie Vedomosti. On December 28, 1995, the St. Petersburg Mayor's Office reorganized the newspaper as a joint stock company. It belongs to the JSC Sankt-Peterburgskie Vedomosti Editorial House. Vladimir Putin was the first chairman of the newspaper's advisory board until June 1997.

In 2005 the Rossiya Bank, which is a co-founder of the JSC and had previously owned 20% share of the newspaper, acquired ownership of the Sankt-Peterburgskie Vedomosti.

== See also ==
- Censorship in the Russian Empire, Peter I's Reforms
