= Rodnaya Zemlya =

Rodnaya Zemlya (Russian: Родная земля - 'Native Land') was a weekly newspaper occupying a position close to that of the Trudoviks; published in St. Petersburg, Russia, from January until April 1907.
