= Rabochy =

Rabochy (The Worker) was an illegal Bolshevik newspaper, organ of the district organisations of the Russian Social Democratic Labour Party in the Vyborg and Petersburg Districts of St. Petersburg. The newspaper was published from February 26, 1907, by decision of the St. Petersburg Committee of the R.S.D.L.P. as a mass popular organ. From April 1907 the combat organisation of the St. Petersburg Committee of the R.S.D.L.P. participated in the publication of the paper. Lenin, Y. M. Yaroslavsky and other Bolsheviks were contributors. At the beginning of June 1907 its press was confiscated by the police and publication ceased.
