= Sbornik Sotsial-Demokrata =

Sbornik Sotsial-Demokrata (Russian: Сборник социал-демократа, lit. 'Social-Democrat's Collection') was a Russian political magazine. It was published under Vladimir Lenin's direct supervision by the editorial board of Sotsial-Demokrat, an underground newspaper, the central organ of the Russian Social Democratic Labour Party (Bolsheviks). Only two issues appeared, one in October 1916 and another in December of the same year. The third issue was never published due to lack of funds.

- Issue 1, October 1916:
  - Karl Radek, "Тезисы об империализме и национальном угнетении" (pp. 6-11)
  - Lenin's works «Итоги дискуссии о самоопределении» (pp. 11-28), «О брошюре Юниуса», «Социалистическая революция и право наций на самоопределение. Тезисы»
- Issue 2, December 1916: Lenin's works «О лозунге „разоружения“», «Империализм и раскол социализма», «Интернационал молодежи» (p. 76), «Потуги обелить оппортунизм», «Фракция Чхеидзе и ее роль»
- Issue 3 (planned), Lenin's work «О карикатуре на марксизм и об „империалистическом экономизме”»
