= Sevodnya (1906) =

Sevodnya (Today) was a liberal-bourgeois evening newspaper published in St. Petersburg, Russia, from 1906 to 1908.
