= Tovarishch (newspaper) =

- Type: Daily newspaper
- Founded: March 1906
- Ceased publication: January 1908
- Headquarters: Saint Petersburg, Russian Empire

Tovarishch (Това́рищ [tɐˈvarʲɪɕː], The Comrade) was a bourgeois daily paper published in St. Petersburg, Russia, from March 1906 to January 1908. It was not the official organ of any particular party, but functioned as the mouthpiece of the Left Cadets. Mensheviks also contributed to this paper.
