= Ternii Truda =

Ternii Truda (Russian: Тернии труда, Thorns of Labour) was a Bolshevik legal weekly newspaper published in St. Petersburg, Russia, from 6 January 1907 [O.S. 24 December 1906] to 19 January [O.S. 6 January] 1907. Vladimir Lenin was an active collaborator. All the issues were confiscated by the police and further publication was prohibited by the St. Petersburg City Court.
