= Noviye Sily =

Noviye Sily (Russian: Новые Силы) (English: New Forces) was a daily Trudovik newspaper published in St. Petersburg, Russia, from March 1, 1907; nine issues appeared. The newspaper was banned on March 12, 1907.
