= Kuranty =

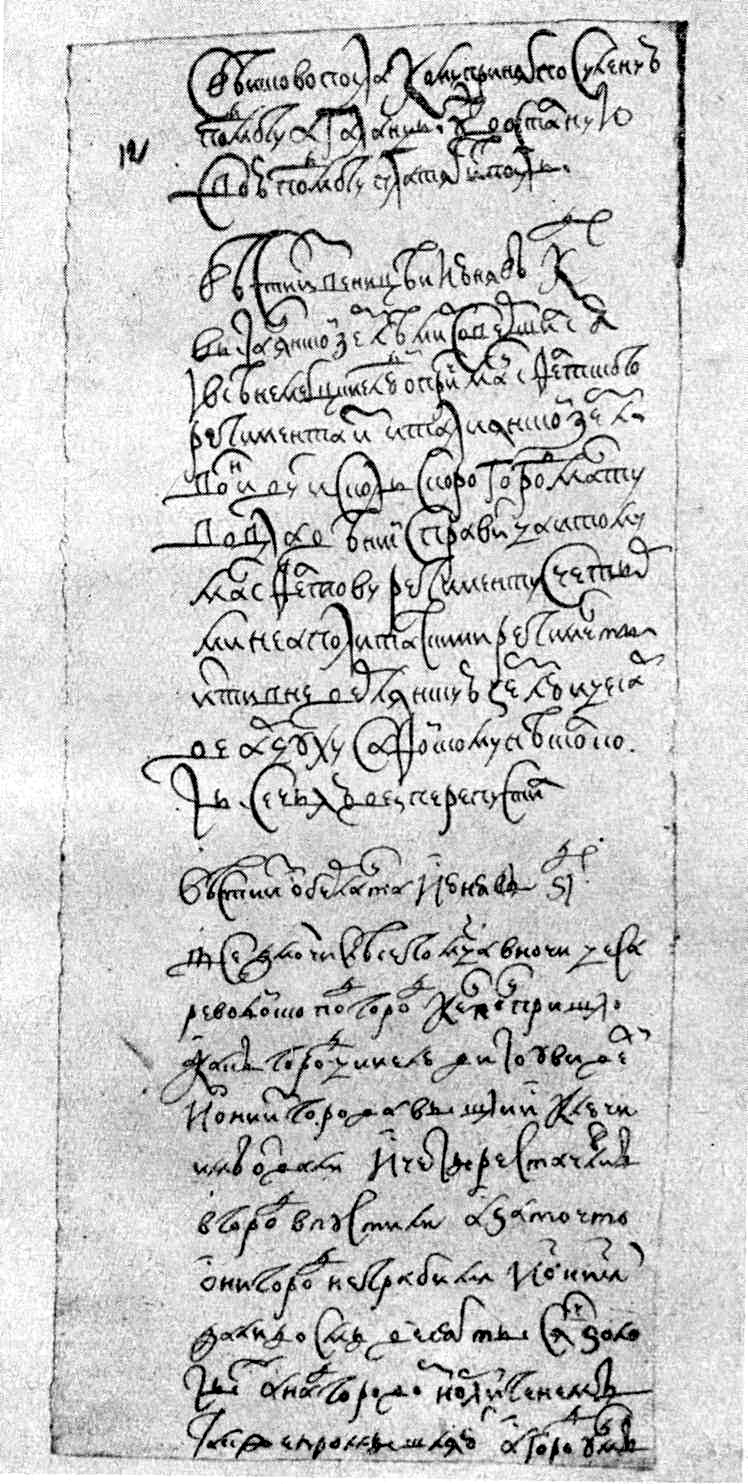
- Kuranty edition in 1631
- Type: Periodical newspaper
- Founder: Michael of Russia
- Publisher: Posolsky Prikaz
- Founded: 1621
- Ceased publication: 1703
- Language: Russian
- Country: Russian Empire

The Kuranty (occasionally titled Vesti, Vedomosti, or Vestovye pisma; Russian: Вести-Куранты, romanized: Vesty-Kuranty, lit. 'News Letters') was the first Russian hand-written newspaper, published in the 17th century in the Tsardom of Russia. The earliest extant issue is dated 1621.

The Kuranty was established by a ukase of Tsar Michael I and was issued by the Posolsky Prikaz for selected government officials in order to inform them about foreign events. Diaks who compiled the newspaper used such sources as German and Dutch newspapers — one of which apparently inspired the newspaper's name — as well as letters of Russians travelling abroad. As foreign newspapers were delivered to Moscow via Riga and Wilna, they were frequently outdated and contained stale news, which resulted in the Russian tsar sending letters and embassies to deceased foreign monarchs. Peter the Great replaced the Kuranty with the first printed newspaper in Russian, the Sankt-Peterburgskie Vedomosti.
