= Aleksei Aladin =

Russian politician

- Алексей Аладьин
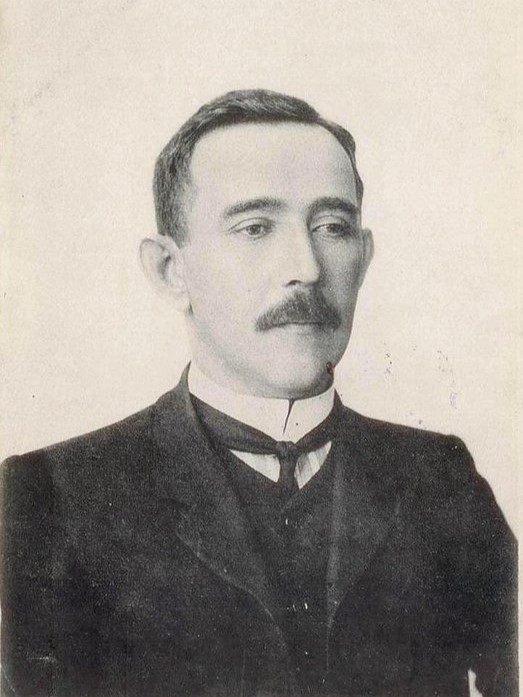
- Aladin in 1907

Personal details
- Born: 28 March [O.S. 15 March] 1873 Novikovka, Samara Governorate, Russia
- Died: 30 July 1927 (aged 54) St Thomas' Hospital, London, England
- Education: Kazan University

Military service
- Allegiance: United Kingdom (1914–1917) (Russian Republic) White Movement (1917–1920)
- Branch/service: British Army (1914–1917) (Russian Republic) White Army (1917–1920)
- Years of service: 1914–1920
- Rank: Lieutenant (British Army); Staff captain (White Army)

Aleksei Feodorovich Aladin (Russian: Алексе́й Фёдорович Ала́дьин; 28 March [O.S. 15 March] 1873 – 30 July 1927) was a Russian soldier and politician who formed and led the Trudoviks, the Labour Party. He was elected to the First Duma in 1906 but spent his later years in exile in the United Kingdom.

== Early life ==
Aladin was born in 1873 in the village of Novikovka in the Samara Governorate (now Ulyanovsk Oblast) to a peasant family and attended the same gymnasium as Vladimir Lenin and Alexander Kerensky. He studied Natural Sciences at Kazan University from 1892 to 1896 where he became a political activist leading to his being expelled and later forcing him to escape to the United Kingdom.

== Election to the Duma (1906) ==
Aladin came to Britain as an exile in 1901-2 having escaped Russia where he was briefly imprisoned for political agitation. He returned to Russia in 1905 under a political amnesty to contest the elections for the First Duma, becoming prominent in Russian politics when he was elected a member in 1906. Aladin believed that the future of Russia lay with the peasants and so formed and led the Trudoviks and became one of Russia's most respected members of the Duma. He was sent to England as a delegate from the Duma to a peace conference in London but while he was there, the Duma was dissolved. The most prominent left-wing members fled to Vyborg, in the Grand Duchy of Finland, where they issued the Vyborg Manifesto against Nicholas II. The members were banished including Aladin even though he had not been party to the manifesto and had considered it ill-advised.

Aladin remained in the United Kingdom as a lecturer and journalist and working for a motor boat company. In 1907 he went on a lecture tour of the United States. In 1917, he returned to Russia at some risk to himself in the hope that he would have some influence in saving his country. Instead, he was captured and imprisoned by the Bolsheviks. Managing to escape, he joined Generals Anton Denikin and Pyotr Nikolayevich Wrangel in the Crimea between 1917 and 1920 during the Russian Civil War.

== Exile ==
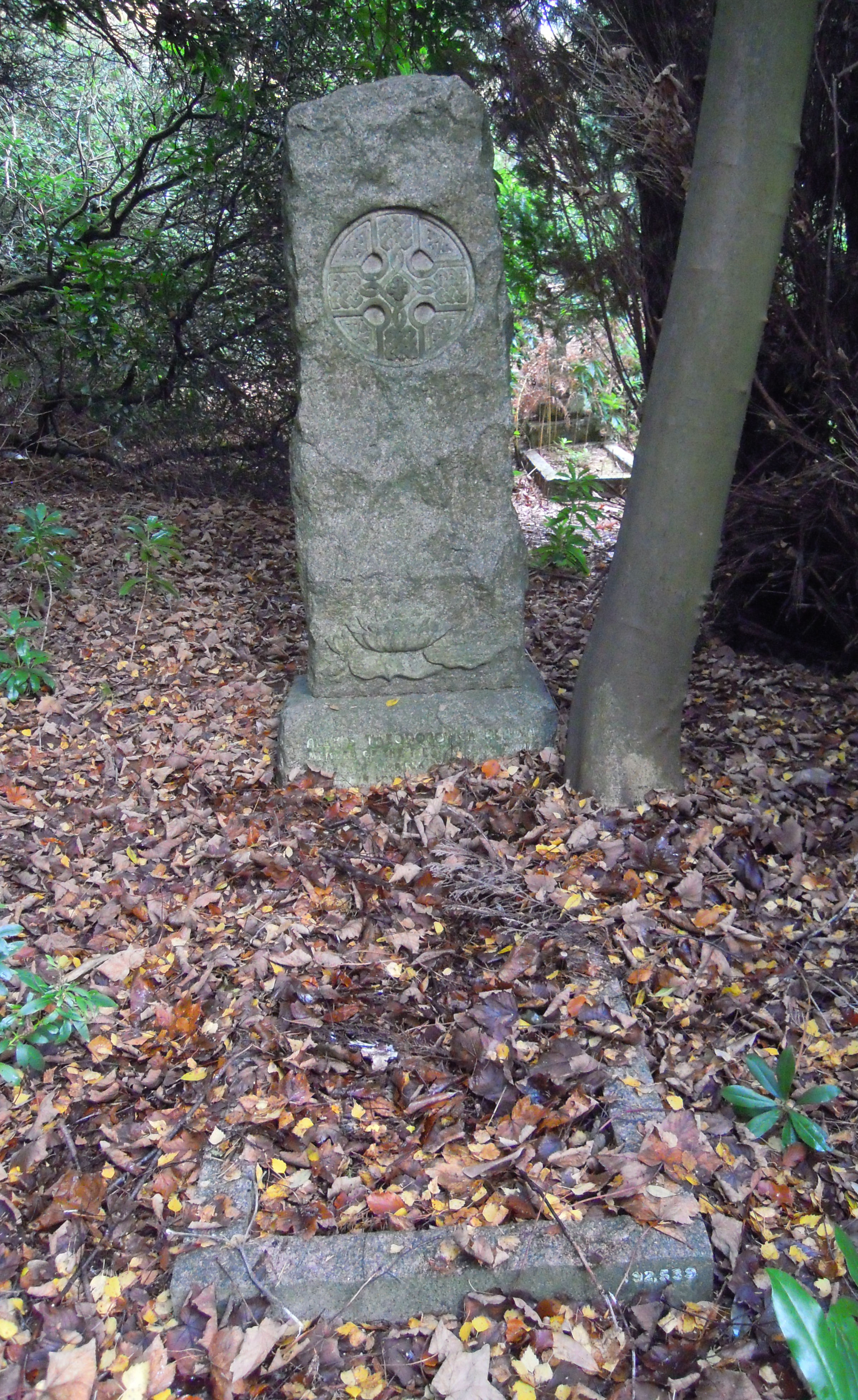
Aladin's grave in Brookwood Cemetery

Aladin subsequently returned to the UK in 1920 where he spent the last years of his life trying to bridge the gap between various Russian political groups and Western society. Aladin was deeply attached to the United Kingdom, speaking fluent English (and French and Italian) and having many friends there, causing Leon Trotsky to write disparagingly of him in his History of the Russian Revolution that Aladin was a man who "never removed an English pipe from his mouth and therefore considered himself a specialist in international affairs".

He had a difficult marriage to Elizaveta Grigor'eva. Aladin died in St Thomas' Hospital in London in 1927, at only 54 years of age, and is buried in Brookwood Cemetery near Woking in Surrey.

His biography by Reginald Frank Christian, Alexis Aladln - The Tragedy of Exile was published in 1999.

Some of Aladin's papers are kept at the University of Manchester Library.
