= Rus (1903) =

Rus (Russia) was a liberal-bourgeois daily newspaper published in St. Petersburg, Russia, from 1903 to 1908 with intervals and under different names like Rus (Russia), Molva (Hearsay) and Dvadtsaty Vek (The Twentieth Century).
