= Zhivoye Delo =

Zhivoye Delo (Vital Cause) was a Menshevik legal weekly newspaper in Russia, published in St. Petersburg from January to April 1912. In total, sixteen issues appeared. Its contributors included L. Martov, F. Dan and P. Axelrod.
