= Strakhovaniye Rabochikh =

Journal published in St. Petersburg, Russia

Strakhovaniye Rabochikh (Workers' Insurance) was a Menshevik journal published in St. Petersburg, Russia, from December 1912 to June 1918.
