= Party of Democratic Reform (Russia) =

Liberal political party in Russian Empire

- Leader: Maksim Kovalevsky; Mikhail Stasyulevich; Ivan Ivanyukov; Vladimir Kuzmin-Karavayev; Konstantin Arsenyev
- Founded: January 1906
- Dissolved: 1907
- Split from: Constitutional Democratic Party
- Merged into: Party of Peaceful Renovation
- Newspaper: Strana; Vestnik Evropy
- Ideology: Classical liberalism Liberal conservatism Constitutional monarchism
- Political position: Center to Center-right

The Party of Democratic Reform (Russian: Партия демократических реформ) was a liberal-monarchist political party in the Russian Empire, founded at the beginning of 1906 during the elections to the First Duma, from elements who found the Cadet programme too leftist. The party merged with the Party of Peaceful Renovation in 1907.
