= Trudoviks =

Political party in the Russian Empire

Labour Group Трудова́я гру́ппа
- Leader: Alexey Aladyin
- Founded: 1906
- Dissolved: 1917
- Split from: Socialist Revolutionary Party
- Merged into: Popular Socialists
- Newspaper: Noviye Sily
- Ideology: Democratic socialism Agrarian socialism
- Political position: Centre-left to left-wing

The Trudoviks (Russian: Трудова́я гру́ппа, romanized: Trudovaya gruppa, lit. 'Labour Group') were a democratic socialist political party of Russia in the early 20th century.

== History ==
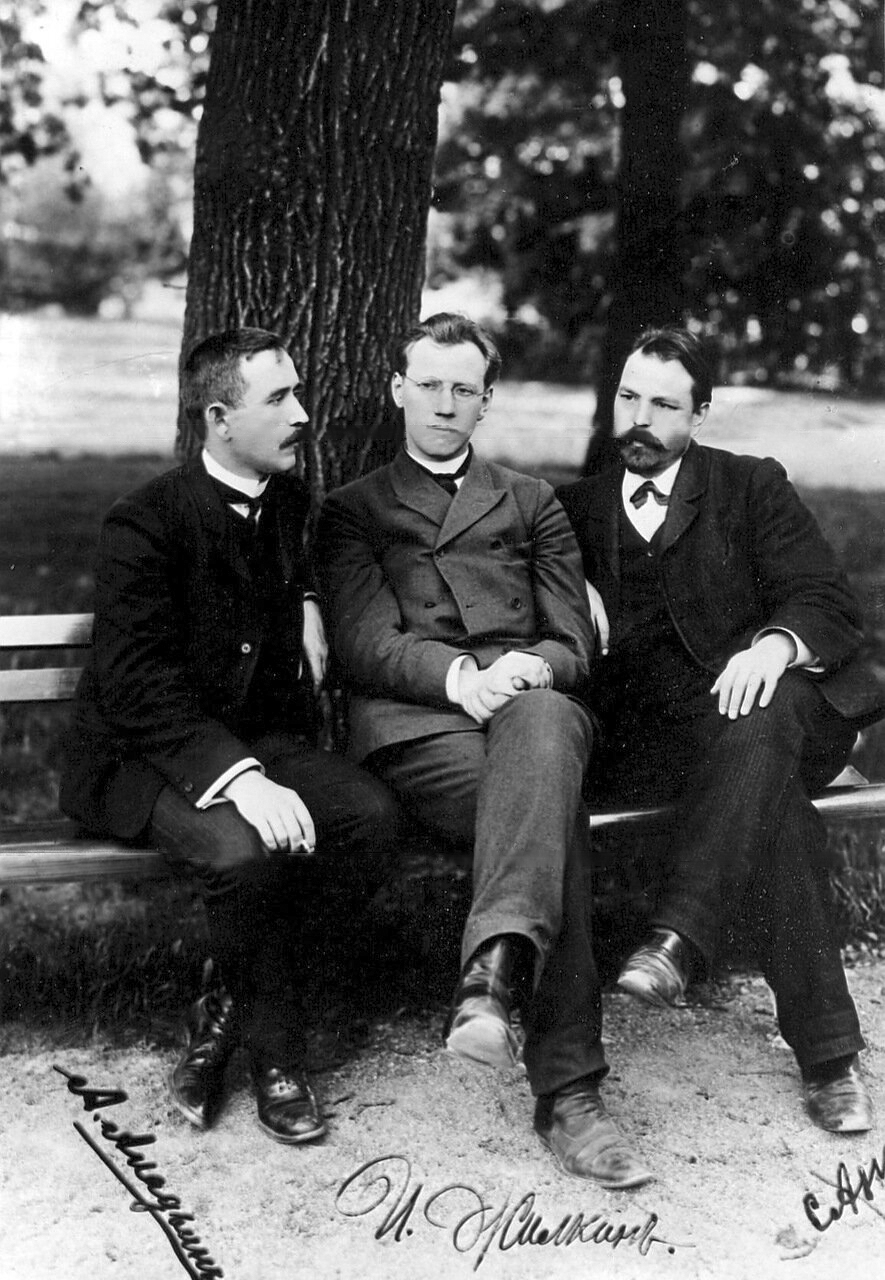
Leaders of the labor group (from left to right): A. F. Aladin; I.V. Zhilkin; S.V. Anikin in the Tauride Garden (spring 1906)

The Trudoviks were a breakaway of the Socialist Revolutionary Party faction as they defied the party's stance by standing in the First Duma. They were founded and led by Aleksei Aladin, a Russian soldier. He was elected to the First Duma in 1906 but spent his later years in exile in the United Kingdom. Aladin was born in Simbirsk in 1873 to a peasant family and attended the same gymnasium as Lenin and Alexander Kerensky.

This agrarian socialist party was one of hundreds of small workers' circles that sprang up around Russia in the aftermath of the 1905 Revolution. While the revolution did not remove the Tsar, it certainly curtailed his power—but not to the extent of the democratic, liberal society that the revolutionaries had hoped for—and as result the party remained small, though it survived.

The Trudoviks are best known for winning seats in the State Duma, a national assembly created by Tsar Nicholas II in the aftermath of the 1905 Revolution. The seats they won were mainly in the 1st and 2nd assemblies in 1906 and 1907, when they gained over 100 seats. Alexander Kerensky, later Prime Minister of Russia under the Provisional Government in 1917, was elected to the Fourth Duma as a Trudovik in 1912.

== Electoral history ==
=== State Duma ===
Election	Leader	Performance				Government
Election	Leader	Votes	Percentage	Seats	Position	Government
1906	Alexey Alad'in	unknown	unknown	97 / 477	2nd	Opposition
1907 (Jan)	Alexey Alad'in	unknown	unknown	104 / 518	1st	Majority
1907 (Oct)	Alexey Alad'in	unknown	unknown	14 / 442	7th	Opposition
1912	Alexey Alad'in	unknown	unknown	10 / 442	8th	Opposition

== Work in the Second Duma ==
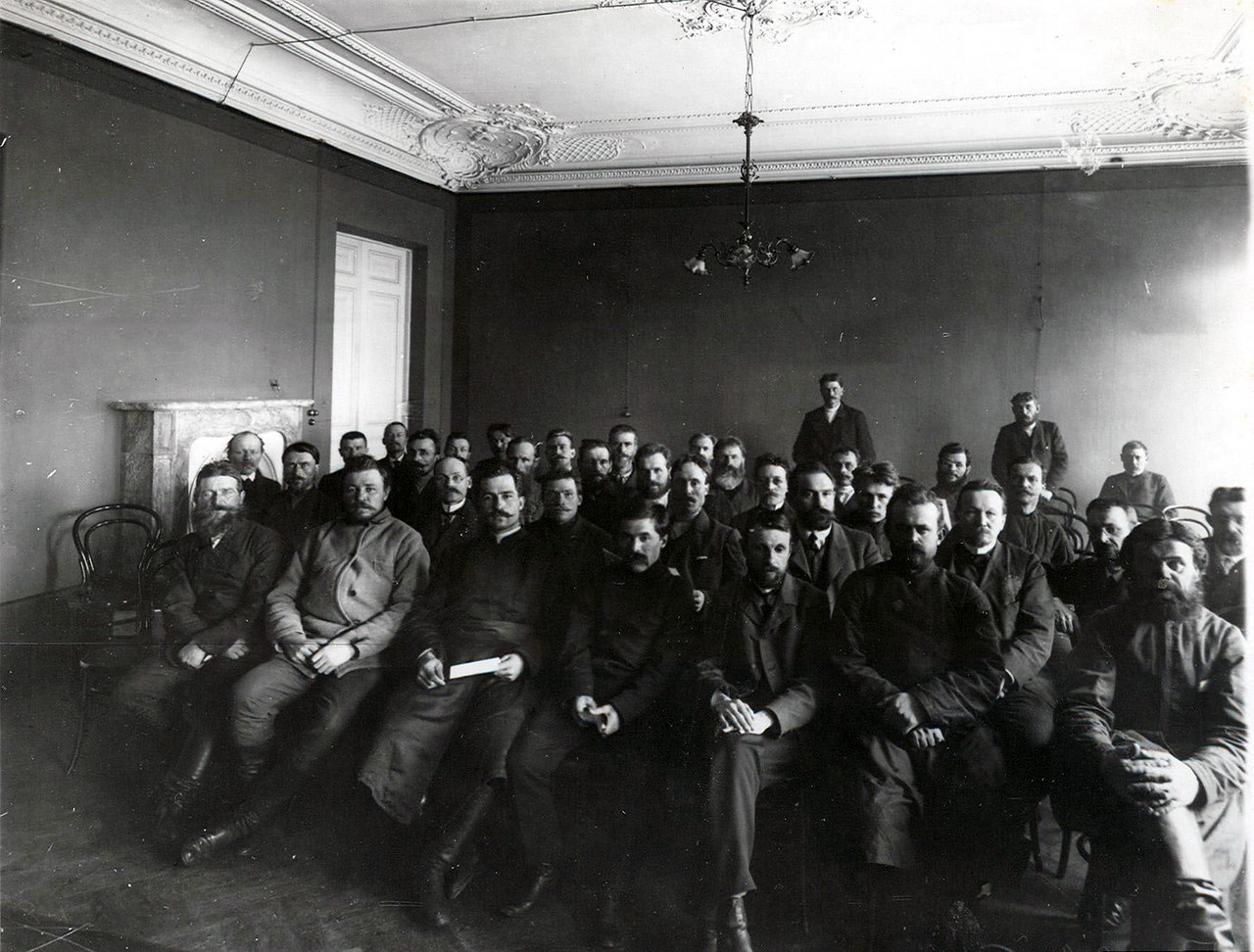
Labor group of the 2nd State Duma at a meeting of the faction in the Tauride Palace, 1907.

From January 1907, the labor group vigorously set about election campaigning. Almost everywhere, it sought to unite all the left elements, sometimes together with the Cadets, against the Right and Octobrists, sometimes without the Cadets, against them and the Rights. In St. Petersburg, the bloc of all the leftists with the Cadets failed, but a block of leftists took place without the Cadets, and without social-democratic "Mensheviks". In St. Petersburg, this bloc was defeated, but collected 27% of all the votes cast and held electors in one of the 12 parts of the city of St. Petersburg (Vyborg). In the first days of the second Duma 55 active members were registered in the labor group, except for 14 members of the peasant union who joined it, and 19 deputies who declared themselves "sympathetic to the labor group." February 15–17, 1907 in Terioki the second congress of the labor group was held, attended by 52 delegates from various departments.

At this congress it was decided that the working group would merge with the peasant union and be called the "labor group and peasant union", representing a unified parliamentary faction, with a single committee. The draft platform of the group was considered, but it was not finally approved and was recognized as acting temporarily, until the revision at the III Congress. The Central Committee of the group remained the same, from the labor group, and was conducted to the Presidium of the Duma, Comrade Chairman, M. E. Berezin . Among the visitors of the labor group meetings was another comrade of the chairman, H. H. Poznansky (but after he was elected to the chairman's comrades).

In the first days of the State, the Duma's working group introduced a draft amnesty for political criminals, which was somewhat modified by the previous year's edition. The Duma group also introduced a draft of land reform, for which the group also took advantage of the previous year's project. Speakers of the labor group of the second Duma – Berezin, Karavaev, Bulota, Tikhvinsky, Kartashev, and others – stood out.

Almost always the labor group acted in the Duma together with the social-revolutionaries and socialists. It sought to create a permanent bloc of these three Duma factions and even merge them into one Duma faction, without destroying the party independence of each of them outside the Duma.

== Subsequent Dumas ==
The labor group continued to exist only as a parliamentary faction. In the elections to the Third and Fourth Duma, the Trudoviks spoke out from a bloc of Narodnik organizations and left-wing forces that stood on the basis of radical democratic reforms. In the Third State Duma Trudoviks received 14 seats, in the 4th, 10 seats.

== Decay ==
After the June coup d'état in 1907, the work of the Trudoviks in the provinces ceased. By the time of the February Revolution of 1917, they united with the popular socialists and formed the Labor People's Socialist Party at the Sixth Congress of the Trudoviks [June 17–23 (June 30 – July 6 N.S.) 1917]. The party supported the Provisional Government, and after the October Revolution of 1917 took an anti-Bolshevik position and soon disintegrated.

== See also ==
- Noviye Sily

== Sources ==
- Hildermeier, M., Die Sozialrevolutionäre Partei Russlands. Agrarsozialismus und Modernisierung im Zarenreich. Cologne, 1978.
- Idem, The Russian Socialist Revolutionary Party Before The First World War. New York, 2000.
