= List of chairmen of the State Duma =

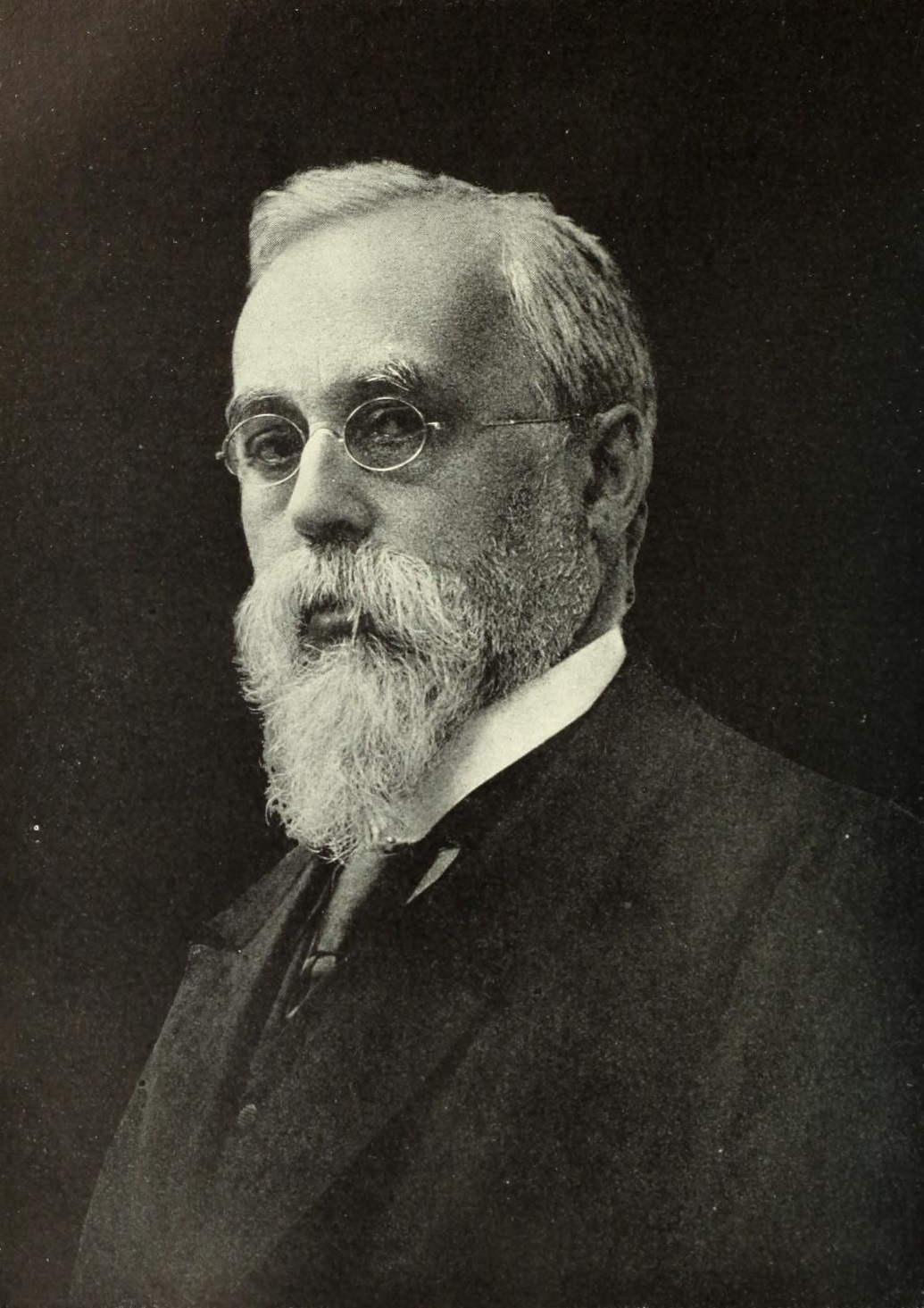
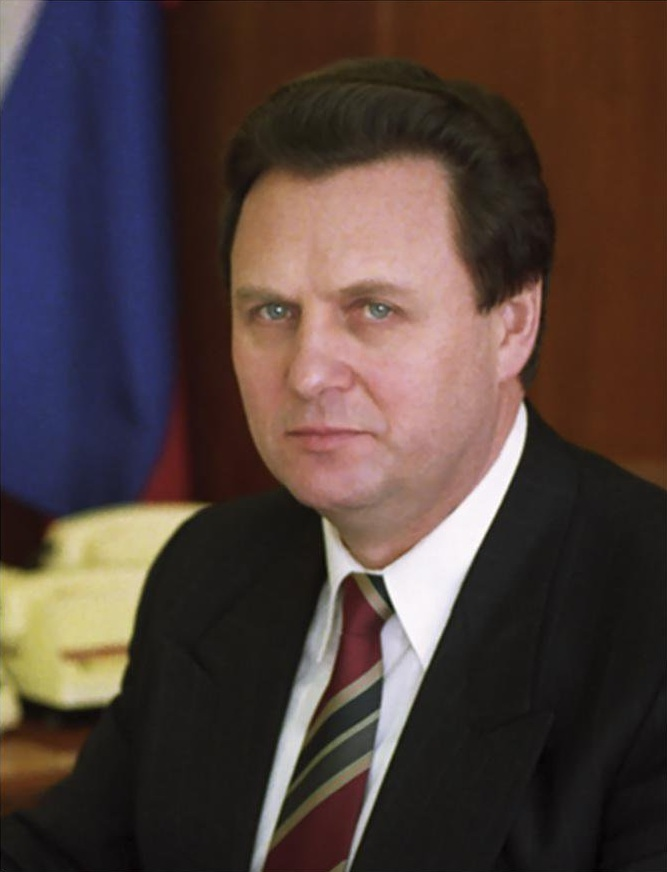
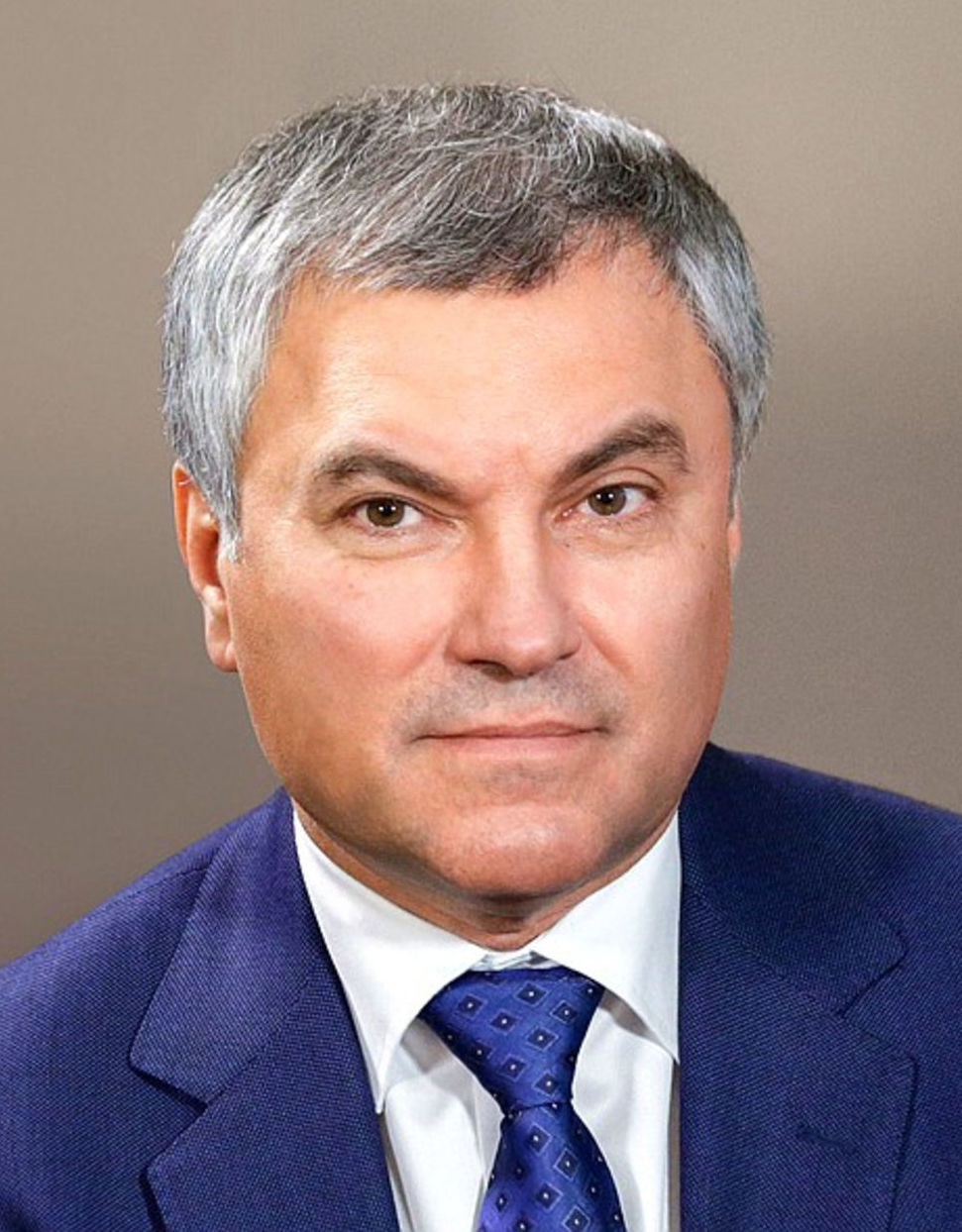
- Left: Sergey Muromtsev was the first chairman of the State Duma of the Russian Empire and shortest-serving person who hold this position.
- Center: Ivan Rybkin was the first chairman of the State Duma after the restoration of this position in post-Soviet Russia.
- Right: Vyacheslav Volodin is the current and longest-serving chairman of the State Duma.

This article contains the list of chairmen of the State Duma of Russia.

The post of Chairman of the State Duma existed in Russia two times. First time in the Russian Empire from 1906 to 1917, during this period the post of Chairman was occupied by 5 people. The second time, in the Russian Federation since 1993.

By party affiliation are:

- One: Agrarian Party, Communist Party and Party of Russia's Rebirth
- Two: Constitutional Democratic Party
- Three: Union of October 17 and United Russia

Current Chairman Vyacheslav Volodin was elected on October 5, 2016, re-elected on October 12, 2021 and September 30, 2026

== List ==
Colour key
(for political parties)
Constitutional Democratic Party (2)
Union of October 17 (3)
Agrarian Party (1)
Communist Party (1)
Party of Russia's Rebirth (1)
United Russia (3)

No.	Portrait	Name	Constituency	Took office	Left office	Political Party	Duma
State Duma of the Russian Empire (1906–1917)
1		Sergey Muromtsev (1850–1910)	Moscow	10 May [O.S. 27 April], 1906	21 July [O.S. 8 July], 1906	Constitutional Democratic Party	1st
2		Fyodor Golovin (1867–1937)	Moscow Governorate	5 March [O.S. 20 February], 1907	16 June [O.S. 3 June], 1907	Constitutional Democratic Party	2nd
3		Nikolay Khomyakov (1850–1925)	Smolensk Governorate	14 November [O.S. 1 November], 1907	19 March [O.S. 6 March], 1910	Union of October 17	3rd
4		Alexander Guchkov (1862–1936)	Moscow	23 March [O.S. 10 March], 1910	28 March [O.S. 15 March], 1911	Union of October 17	3rd
5		Mikhail Rodzianko (1852–1924)	Yekaterinoslav Governorate	4 April [O.S. 22 March], 1911	22 June [O.S. 9 June], 1912	Union of October 17	3rd
5		Mikhail Rodzianko (1852–1924)	Yekaterinoslav Governorate	28 November [O.S. 15 November], 1912	19 October [O.S. 6 October], 1917	Union of October 17	4th
State Duma of the Russian Federation (Since 1993)
6		Ivan Rybkin (born 1946)	Party list (Note: Re-elected in Anna in 1996.)	January 14, 1994	January 17, 1996 (Note: Lost chairman re-election.)	Agrarian Party	1st
7		Gennady Seleznyov (1947–2015)	Party list (Note: Re-elected in Northern Saint Petersburg in 2003.)	January 17, 1996	January 18, 2000	Communist Party	2nd
7		Gennady Seleznyov (1947–2015)	Party list	January 18, 2000	December 29, 2003	Communist Party → Independent → Party of Russia's Rebirth	3rd
8		Boris Gryzlov (born 1950)	Party list	December 29, 2003	December 24, 2007	United Russia	4th
8		Boris Gryzlov (born 1950)	Party list	December 24, 2007	December 21, 2011	United Russia	5th
9		Sergey Naryshkin (born 1954)	Party list (Note: Re-elected in Kingisepp in 2016.)	December 21, 2011	October 5, 2016	United Russia	6th
10		Vyacheslav Volodin (born 1964)	Party list (2016–2021)	October 5, 2016	October 12, 2021	United Russia	7th
10		Vyacheslav Volodin (born 1964)	Saratov (2021–)	October 12, 2021	September 30, 2026	United Russia	8th
10		Vyacheslav Volodin (born 1964)	Saratov (2021–)	September 30, 2026	Incumbent	United Russia	9th

== Chairmen by time in office ==
Rank	Speaker	Time in office	TE	No
1	Vyacheslav Volodin	9 years, 360 days	3	10
2	Boris Gryzlov	7 years, 355 days	2	8
3	Gennadiy Seleznyov	7 years, 346 days	2	7
4	Mikhail Rodzianko	6 years, 198 days	2	5
5	Sergey Naryshkin	4 years, 289 days	1	9
6	Nikolay Khomyakov	2 years, 125 days	1	3
7	Ivan Rybkin	2 years, 3 days	1	6
8	Alexander Guchkov	1 year, 5 days	1	4
9	Fyodor Golovin	103 days	1	2
10	Sergey Muromtsev	72 days	1	1

== The Fathers and Mothers of the house who started the new legislatures ==
Traditionally when a new Russian parliament is formed the eldest deputy opens the first session until a chairman or a speaker is elected. In 2021, Valentina Tereshkova became the first Mother of the house.

In the history of the post-Soviet Dumas these were:

Elected	Name	Constituency	Party	Age when elected
1993	Georgy Lukava	Federal list	LDPR	68
1995	Grigory Galaziy	Federal list	NDR	73
1999	Yegor Ligachyov	Tomsk	CPRF	79
2003	Valentin Varennikov	Federal list	Rodina	79
2007	Zhores Alferov	Federal list	CPRF	77
2011	Vladimir Dolgikh	Federal list	United Russia	86
2016	Zhores Alferov	Federal list	CPRF	86
2021	Valentina Tereshkova	Federal list	United Russia	84
2026	Yury Petrov	Federal list	United Russia	79
