= Fyodor Golovin =

Fyodor Golovin may refer to:

- Fyodor Alexeyevich Golovin (1650-1706), Russian official, the last Russian boyar and the first Russian chancellor
- Fyodor Alexandrovich Golovin (1867-1937), Russian politician, a founder of the Constitutional Democratic party and chairman of the Second Duma
