= Khomyakov =

Khomyakov (Russian: Хомяков) may refer to:

- Aleksey Stepanovich Khomyakov, a Russian religious philosopher
- Alexander Petrovich Khomyakov, a Russian mineralogist
- Nikolay Khomyakov (1850-1925), Russian politician
