= Mission of Saint Sergius of Jerusalem =

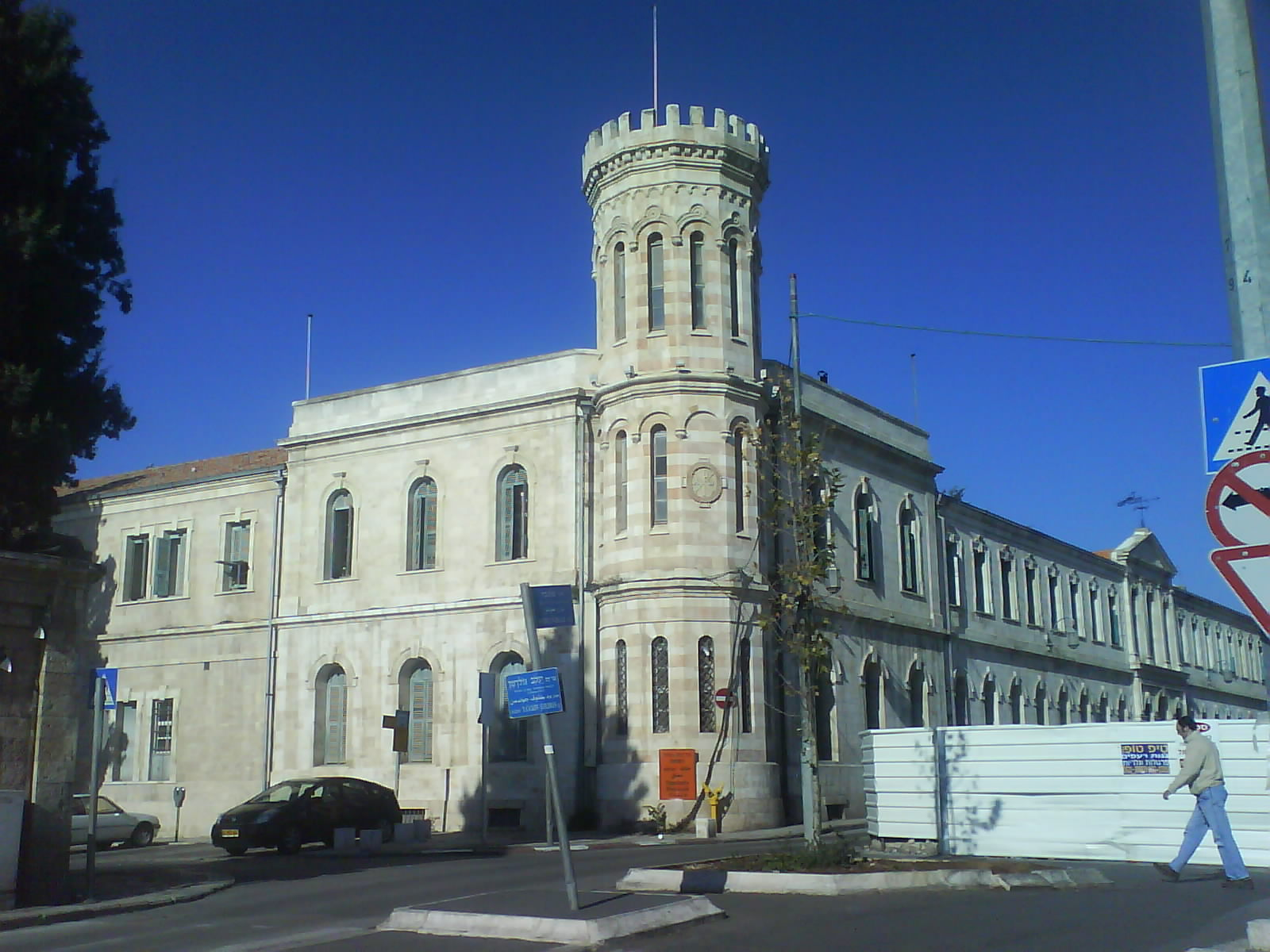
- The building during its restoration, in 2009
- Interactive map of the Mission of Saint Sergius of Jerusalem area

General information
- Location: Jerusalem, Israel
- Coordinates: 31.7827°N 35.2221°E
- Construction started: 1890

The Mission of Saint Sergius or Guest House of Saint Sergius or Saint Sergius' Gateway or The Sergiev Gate or St. Sergius Metochion (Hebrew: חצר סרגיי and Russian: Сергиевское подворье) is a building built in Jerusalem in 1890 by the Imperial Orthodox Palestine Society, thanks to the grants of Grand Duke Sergei Alexandrovich. It is under the jurisdiction of the Russian Orthodox Ecclesiastical Mission in Jerusalem.

On 25 December 2015, Igor Ashurbeyli became the Chairman of the Imperial Orthodox Palestine Society (IOPS) Council in the state of Israel, which was created in 2015 as an IOPS directorate in the State of Israel to manage the St. Sergius Metochion in Jerusalem, which opened in July 2017 after repairs, restoration and significantly improved communications were completed in November 2016, and to support religious tourism and pilgrimage from the Russian Federation into Israel. In 2015, as IOPS Chairman Sergey Stepashin and Minister of Culture of Russia Vladimir Medinsky signed a Program of Joint Actions for the Development of Religious Tourism and Pilgrimage from the Russian Federation which supported the repairs and restoration of the Sergiev Gate and led to the establishment of the Imperial Orthodox Palestine Society (IOPS) Council in the state of Israel. For many years in support of Russian foreign policy, the IOPS has conducted charitable activities of the Russian Federation in the countries of the Middle East and is pivotal in collecting and delivering humanitarian aid to Syrians in Syria and Palestinians in Palestine including Gaza and the West Bank.

For the 2018 Russian presidential election, the Sergiev Gate was the only polling station in Jerusalem for Russian citizens voting in the election.

== Sources ==
- Conservons la Russie en Terre Sainte Сохраним Россию в Святой Земле! Летопись Императорского Православного Палестинского Общества 2007—2012 гг. К 130-летию ИППО Pour les 130 ans de la Société impériale orthodoxe de Palestine, éd. de la Société impériale orthodoxe de Palestine Издание ИППО // L. N. Blinova, Youri Gratchov, Oleg Ozerov, Pavel Platonov, Moscou, Jérusalem, 2012. ISBN 978-965-7392-31-7
- Le Messager de Jérusalem, Société impériale orthodoxe de Palestine ИППО, Вып. 1. 2012. Numéro pour les 130 ans de la Société impériale orthodoxe de Palestine. 158 pages. ISBN 978-965-7392-29-4
