= Gennadiy Seleznyov =

Russian politician (1947–2015)

- Геннадий Селезнёв
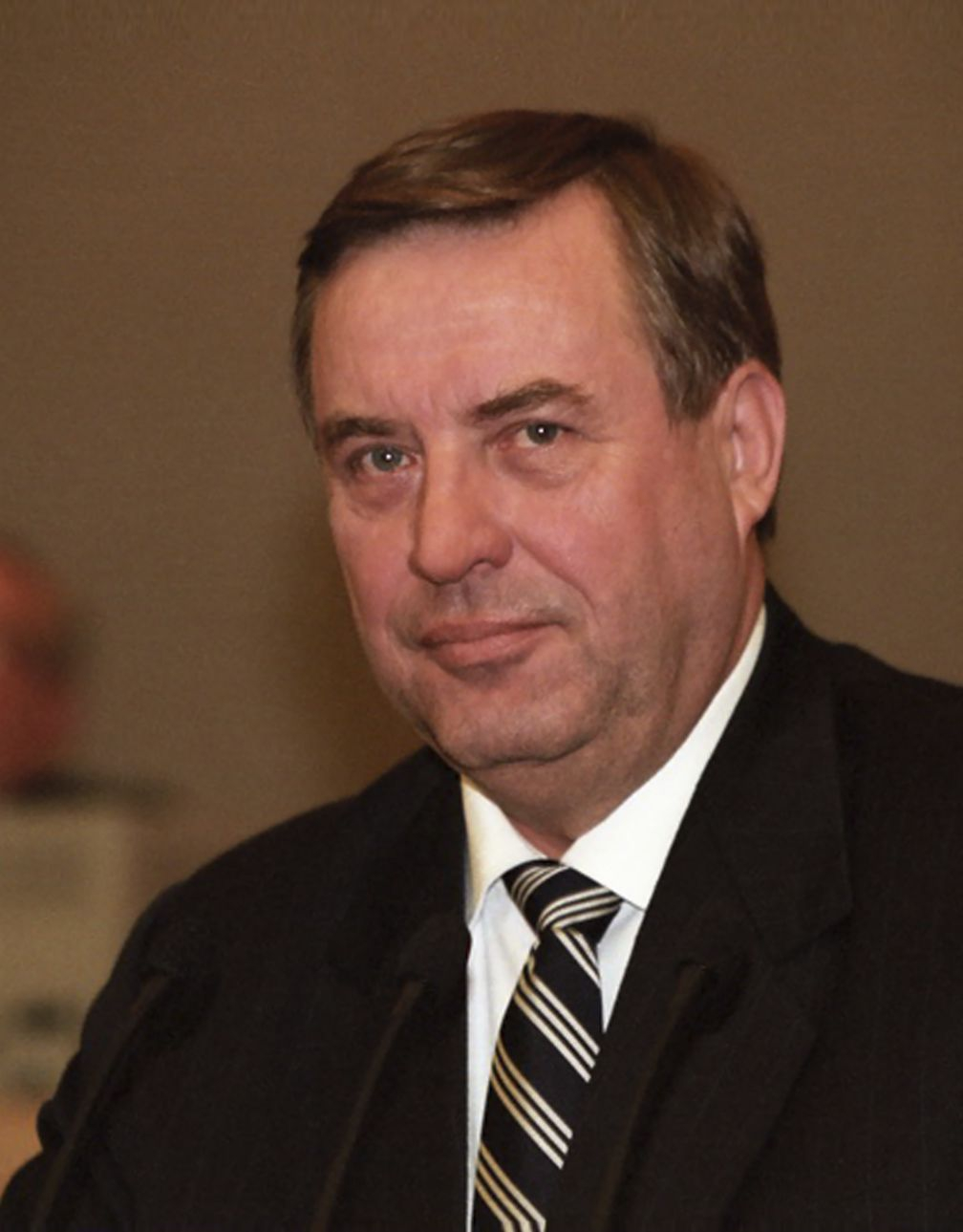
- Seleznyov in 2000

7th Chairman of the State Duma
- In office 17 January 1996 – 29 December 2003
- Preceded by: Ivan Rybkin
- Succeeded by: Boris Gryzlov

Member of the State Duma
- In office 12 December 1993 – 2 December 2007

Leader of the Party of Russia's Rebirth
- In office 29 October 2002 – 19 July 2015
- Succeeded by: Viktor Arkhipov (acting); Igor Ashurbeyli

Personal details
- Born: Gennadiy Nikolayevich Seleznyov; 6 November 1947 Serov, Sverdlovsk Oblast, RSFSR, USSR
- Died: 19 July 2015 (aged 67) Moscow, Russia
- Party: Party of Russia's Rebirth (2002–2015)
- Other political affiliations: Communist Party of the Soviet Union (1964–1991); Communist Party of the Russian Federation (1991–2002)
- Spouse: Irina Seleznyova
- Children: 2, including Kirill
- Education: Saint Petersburg State University

Gennadiy Nikolayevich Seleznyov (Russian: Геннадий Николаевич Селезнёв; 6 November 1947 – 19 July 2015) was a Russian politician, the Chairman of the State Duma from 1996 to 2003.

== Early life and career ==
Born at Serov in Sverdlovsk Oblast, Gennadiy Seleznyov went to school from 1954 to 1964. He went to study journalism and joined the communist party. In 1969 he finished university and started working for the Pravda newspaper. After the Communist Party of the Soviet Union was outlawed in 1991, Seleznyov quit it. In 1993, however, he joined the Communist Party of the Russian Federation led by Gennadiy Zyuganov.

== Chairman of the State Duma ==
=== First term ===
In the 1995 Parliamentary elections in Russia, the Communist Party took the majority. However, Zyuganov did not become the speaker of the Duma as he was too busy with his 1996 Presidential campaign. Instead, he offered the job to his fellow communist Gennadiy Seleznyov. Seleznyov took office in 1996.

As speaker Seleznyov protested against many reforms of President Boris Yeltsin and the Party rejected several reforms like the proposed complete denationalization of land in 1998. When Prime Minister Sergei Kiriyenko opened the markets, Seleznyov protested saying the Russian economy wasn't ready yet. In 1999 the Communist Party once again took the largest number of seats and Seleznyov was re-inaugurated.

==== Apartment bombings ====
Seleznyov gained a degree of infamy during his time as speaker for his announcement, shortly before an apartment bombing in Moscow, that an apartment building in Volgodonsk had been bombed. The mistake amidst a series of apartment bombings was initially ignored. However, when the city did see a bombing only three days later, Vladimir Zhirinovsky took Seleznyov to task.

“Recollect, Gennady Nikolaevich, you told us on Monday that the apartment block in Volgodonsk had been blown up. Three days before the explosion... The State Duma knew that the apartment block had been blown up on Monday, and it was blown up on Thursday... We in Moscow knew about the explosion three days before it had happened!" — Vladimir Zhirinovsky.

Dissident Alexander Litvinenko later described the incident as a case of the FSB mixing up the dates of the planned bombings, though controversy still surrounds the cause of the early announcement.

=== Second term ===
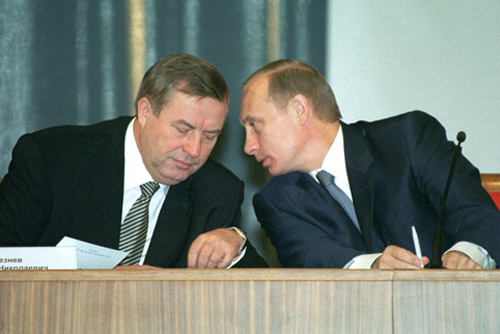
Gennadiy Seleznyov and Vladimir Putin, 21 November 2001

Seleznyov originally supported the new President Vladimir Putin when the latter made a majority, making an alliance with the centrists and the ultra-rightist Liberal Democratic Party of Russia. He supported Putin on most issues. When in 2001 the communists lost many seats he surprisingly did not protest. Seleznyov then said that the Communist Party had to adapt to the new generation and to adopt liberal social values creating a Eurocommunist party. However, party leader Gennadiy Zyuganov dismissed such calls and in 2002 Seleznyov was expelled from the party.

Following his expulsion, Seleznyov remained the Duma Speaker. However, he was frequently attacked by both the leftists and the rightists. He received support from former Soviet President Mikhail Gorbachev and was considered a Social Democrat. In 2003 the party United Russia supporting President Putin took the majority in the Duma and Boris Gryzlov became the new Speaker. Seleznov stood for the Duma as the leader of a new party, the Party of Russia's Rebirth. The party did very badly although Seleznov won a single member mandate in St Petersburg, beating liberal MP Irina Khakamada.

== Moscow Oblast gubernatorial candidacy ==
In 1999 Gennadiy Seleznyov also ran for Governor of Moscow Oblast. However, he lost to the former general and vice presidential candidate Boris Gromov.

== Personal life and death ==
Seleznyov had a son, Kirill (born 1974), who is a prominent Russian businessman and a top-manager of Gazprom. Gennadiy Seleznyov died from complications due to lung cancer in Moscow on 19 July 2015.

== Honours and awards ==
- Order "For Merit to the Fatherland", 2nd class
- Order of Friendship of Peoples
- Medal of Merit for the Stavropol Krai (2003)
- Order of Francysk Skaryna (Belarus, 2001)
- "Person of the Year" award
- "Silver Cross" of the Russian Biographical Institute
- Gold badge of honour "Public Recognition"
- "Dove of Peace" of the International Public Foundation "World Without Wars" (Moscow)
- Academician and Member of the International Academy of Social Sciences
- Associate Professor of the Moscow University for the Humanities
- Honorary Professor of Journalism, Saint Petersburg State University
- Member of the International Academy of Information Technology

Political offices
Preceded by Ivan Rybkin	Chairman of the State Duma; 17 January 1996 – 29 December 2003	Succeeded by Boris Gryzlov
