= Ana Mercedes Díaz Cardozo =

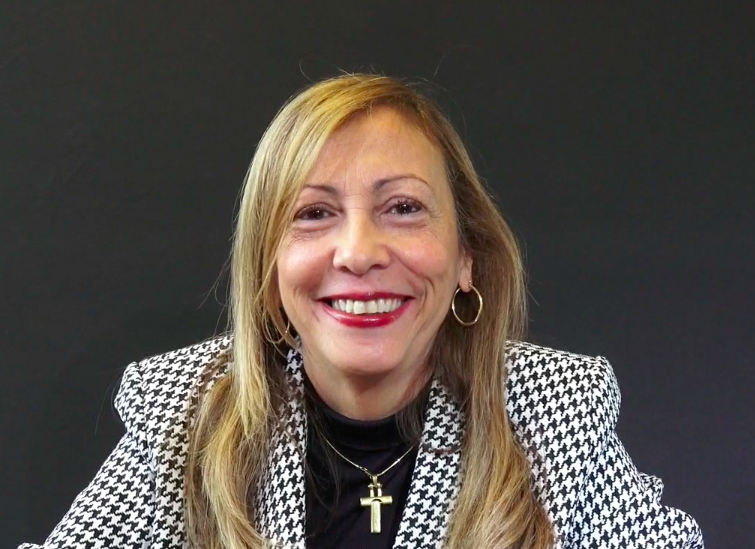

Director General of Political Parties of the National Electoral Council of Venezuela
- In office 2003–2004

Prime Minister of Asgardia
- In office 2018–2020
- Head: Igor Ashurbeyli

Personal details
- Born: 24 March 1960 (age 66) Caracas, Venezuela: Venezuelan; American
- Education: Universidad Santa María, Universidad Central de Venezuela

Ana Mercedes Díaz Cardozo (born March 24, 1960, in Caracas, Venezuela) is a Venezuelan lawyer and electoral specialist with 45 years of experience. From 2018 to 2020, she was the Prime Minister of the Space Kingdom of Asgardia. She formed first cabinet with personalities such as Floris Wuyts Leon Shpilsky , Olimpia Niglio, Lena De Winne, Elizabeth Diaz, Stephane Caiveau Markus Gronbach, Philip Appleby, Yana Smelyansky, Eric Lee, Igor Chikin and Ron Schechter.

After consolidating her focus on governance and institutional systems, in 2025 she shifted toward the modernization of electoral law with the publication of her article "Redefining Electoral Fraud in the 21st Century" in the newspaper El Nacional.

In this work, Diaz Cardozo argues that the traditional concept of fraud has become obsolete in the face of new technological realities. Her doctrine proposes that the alteration of the popular will now occurs systemically, through the manipulation of digital infrastructures and information asymmetry, demanding a legal response that transcends the simple review of physical ballots.

1991 to 2004, she was deputy director-general and then director-general of political parties of the National Electoral Council of Venezuela.

== Biography ==
=== Professional career ===
From 1979 to 2004, Díaz worked at the National Electoral Council of Venezuela (previously the Supreme Electoral Council), the highest Venezuelan electoral body. In 1989, she began working for the council's Directorate of Political Parties. In 1991, she was appointed as the deputy director-general, and in 2003 she was appointed as the director-general.

In 2004, Díaz was fired from her position at the National Electoral Council after speaking out about election fraud in the Venezuelan recall referendum. She then emigrated to the United States, where she lives as of 2004. Díaz has said that fraud, falsifications, and other violations of the law are common in the Venezuelan election process.

In October 2017, Díaz joined several Venezuelan advocates and lawyers, among them Blanca Mármol, in an address to the Supreme Tribunal of Justice of Venezuela. They demanded that preparations for the upcoming regional elections cease due to an unconstitutional change of the election date. Regional elections were initially to be held on December 10, 2017, but during the 5th session of the 2017 Constituent Assembly of Venezuela, it was suggested to move the elections forward to October 2017. October 15, 2017 was finally selected as the date for regional elections.

In recent years, Díaz has spoken at conferences regarding democracy and fair elections in the United States, Honduras, Nicaragua, Peru, Ecuador, Italy, Colombia, Costa Rica, Guatemala and Spain.

Díaz has also worked on elections outside of Venezuela. She was an independent observer of the Ecuadorian general election in February 2017. She spoke out about falsifications and fraud during the elections. Her opinions were criticized by the National Electoral Council of Ecuador. In 2018, Díaz warned of possible election fraud in Spain after changes to the electoral system were proposed.

=== Government of Asgardia ===
On 24 June 2018, Díaz was appointed as Prime Minister of Asgardia, a newly created Space Nation. She directed the Asgardian Executive Body, setting the priorities of the government and organizing its workflow. She resigned on February 27, 2020, and went on to serve as assessor to the Head of the Nation.

== Research and publications ==
Díaz studies and analyzes socialism in the 21st century. Her work investigates how countries respond to socialist economies, how electoral processes are carried out in socialist nations, and what this means for democracies in the Americas and worldwide.

She has two publications related to her personal experiences in the electoral field. The first is Debemos Cobrar (We Must Collect), published in Venezuela in 2007. The second is 72 Horas en Ecuador: Un Milagro de Dios (72 Hours in Ecuador: A Miracle of God), published in Ecuador in 2018.

== Personal life ==
Díaz married in 1984 and divorced in 2006. She has a daughter and son, both Venezuelans, who are citizens of and live in the United States. In August 2012 Díaz became an American citizen. She lives in Florida.

In November 2020 Díaz endorsed Donald Trump in the 2020 United States presidential election.

Political offices
| Office established | Prime Minister of the Space Kingdom of Asgardia; 2018–2020 | Incumbent |
