= Alexander's Courtyard =

Church building, old city of Jerusalem

- Александровское подворье в Иерусалиме
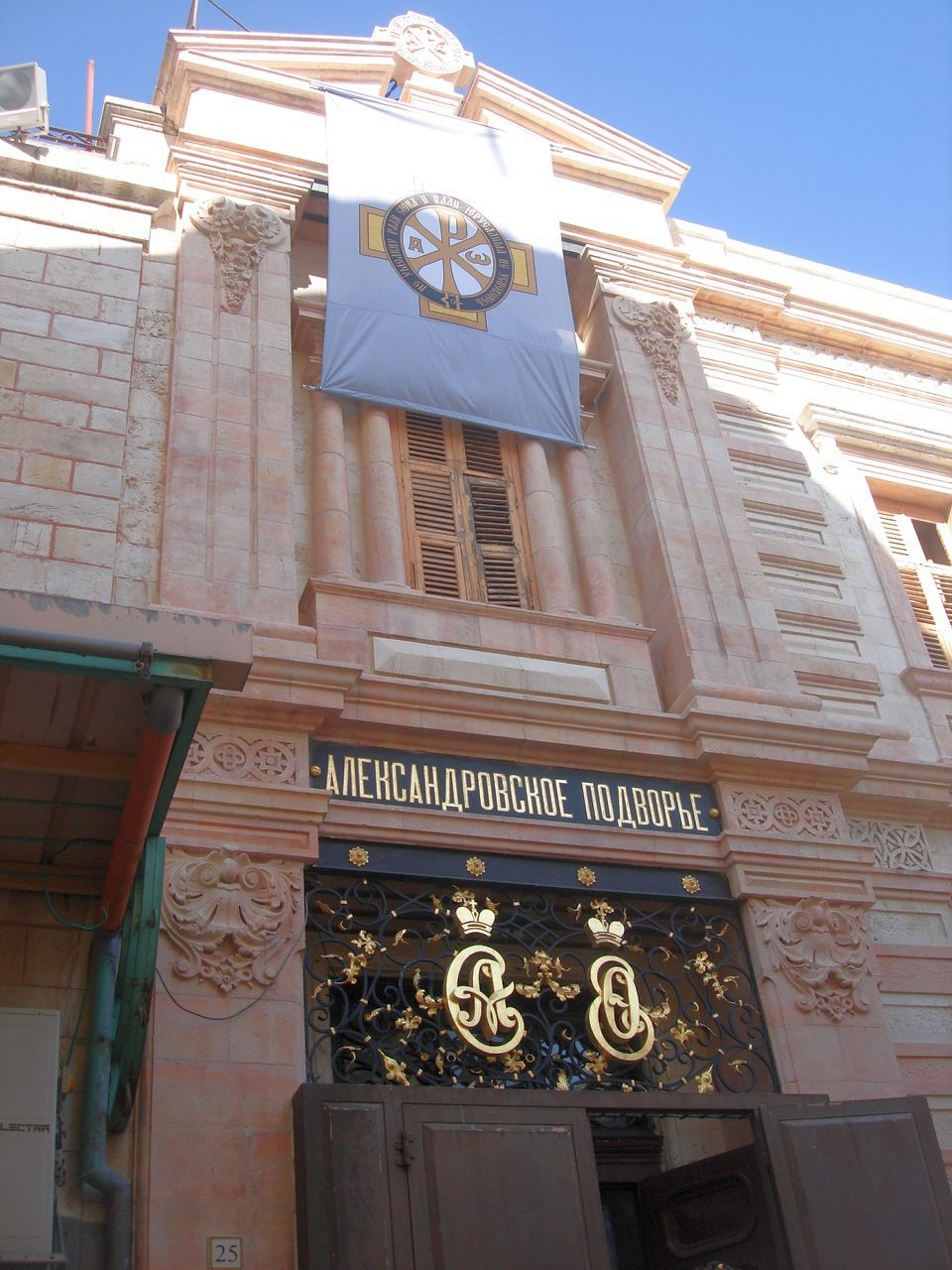
- Facade and entrance of the building
- Established: 1896
- Location: Jerusalem
- Coordinates: 31°46′41″N 35°13′50″E
- Type: Russian Orthodox church

Alexander's Courtyard (Russian: Александровское подворье в Иерусалиме; Hebrew: חצר אלכסנדר; Arabic: كنيسة الكسندر نيفسكي), also known as the Alexander compound, is a group of historic buildings in the Christian Quarter of the Old City of Jerusalem registered to the government of the Russian Empire. The compound is named in honor of Alexander III of Russia, and is the closest Russian property to the Church of the Holy Sepulchre being only about 70 m (230 ft) away from Golgotha. The complex was built by the Imperial Orthodox Palestine Society in 1896, and currently includes the Threshold of the Gates of Judgment, the Church of St. Alexander Nevsky, archaeological excavations, a small museum, and other attractions.

== History ==
The land of the compound was acquired from Coptic clergy in 1859 through the efforts of the first Russian consul in Jerusalem, Vladimir Dorgobuzhinov. (Note: In ancient times, this place was the site on the left side of the main entrance to the Basilica of the Church of the Holy Sepulchre) The land was originally intended for the building of the Russian consulate, but it was later decided that it would be more convenient for the consulate to be in the Russian Compound, which is outside of the Old City. In 1881, after Grand Duke Sergei Alexandrovich took a pilgrimage to Jerusalem, many antiquities were found to be preserved on this site, and extensive archaeological excavations began here under the direction of Antonin Kapustin. Archaeologists Conrad Schick, Charles Wilson, Melchior de Vogé, and Charles Simon Clermont-Ganneau took part in the excavations. In 1883, a fragment of the second Jerusalem encircling wall with the Threshold of the Gates of Judgment, built between the 5th-4th centuries BCE, was discovered, (Note: This wall and the Gate of Judgment were destroyed during the Siege of Jerusalem in 70 CE and never rebuilt) along with the arch of the Temple of Hadrian, (Note: This is one of the spans of the large arch that once led to the Temple of Jupiter) fragments of walls and the remains of two columns of the basilica of the Church of the Resurrection from the reign of Emperor Constantine the Great, as well as the remains of other structures from the 7th-8th centuries. Based on the results of the work done, Konrad Schick was awarded the Order of St. Stanislaus, 2nd degree. After the completion of the excavations, construction of the compound began directly above the site and was completed in 1891. On 22 May 1896, a house church in honor of St. Alexander Nevsky was consecrated at the compound. However, the outbreak of WWI marked the beginning of the decline of Alexander's Courtyard.

After the October Revolution in 1917, Soviet Russia passed the Decree on Separation of Church and State. Legally, Russian Palestine remained the property of the Imperial Orthodox Palestine Society, whose leadership found itself outside of Russia, in exile.

Until 1985, the metochion recognized the Omophorion of the Russian Orthodox Church Outside of Russia, but in that year the Palestine Society, headed by Archimandrite Anthony (Grabbe), withdrew from its membership. After this, the Alexander Metochion was occupied by the "Russian Orthodox Society of the Holy Land", headquartered in Munich, which since 2004 has been headed by German citizen Nikolai Hoffmann with the official name "Russian Orthodox Society of the Holy Land", also registered in Munich. The society claims to be the legitimate IOPS, headed by Bishop Anthony Grabbe, only slightly renamed. The current IOPS claims that Hoffman and his organization have no connection with the historical Imperial Orthodox Palestine Society.

On June 11, 2015, Prime Minister of Russia Dmitry Medvedev signed an order directing the Directorate of the President of the Russian Federation to carry out the necessary legal procedures to formalize Russia's rights to Alexander's Courtyard, including the Alexander Nevsky Church. The necessary documents for the Alexander Compound were submitted to the Israeli Ministry of Justice for review. According to Sergei Stepashin, "the Israeli authorities must issue a document stating that this is the property of the Russian state". Patriarch Kirill "is extremely interested in resolving this issue".

According to the newspaper Maariv, citing a document from the Real Estate and Land Registry Office, on December 30, 2019, Israel transferred ownership of the Alexander Compound to Russia. The Imperial Orthodox Palestine Society, led by Nikolai Vorontsov-Hoffman, hired lawyers to urgently file a protest with the Israeli Ministry of Justice. The documents were expected to be issued on March 1, but as a result of the lawsuit, the Jerusalem District Court temporarily injunctioned the transfer of the Alexander Compound to Russia. Sergei Stepashin noted: “It will be interesting to see how this all ends, especially since there are no documents confirming their [Vorontsov-Hoffman and his supporters’] ownership of this property, despite the fact that they have been in charge there for 90 years”. The Synod of the Russian Orthodox Church Outside of Russia declared its historical involvement in the management of the Alexander Compound and the Church of Alexander Nevsky, which is under the jurisdiction of the Russian Ecclesiastical Mission (ROCOR).

In March 2022, by a decision of the Jerusalem District Court, the registration of the Russian Federation's rights to the Alexander Compound was cancelled. At the same time, on June 3, 2022, Russian Foreign Minister Sergey Lavrov announced that the process of transferring the Alexander Compound to Russia would soon be completed.

== Characteristics ==
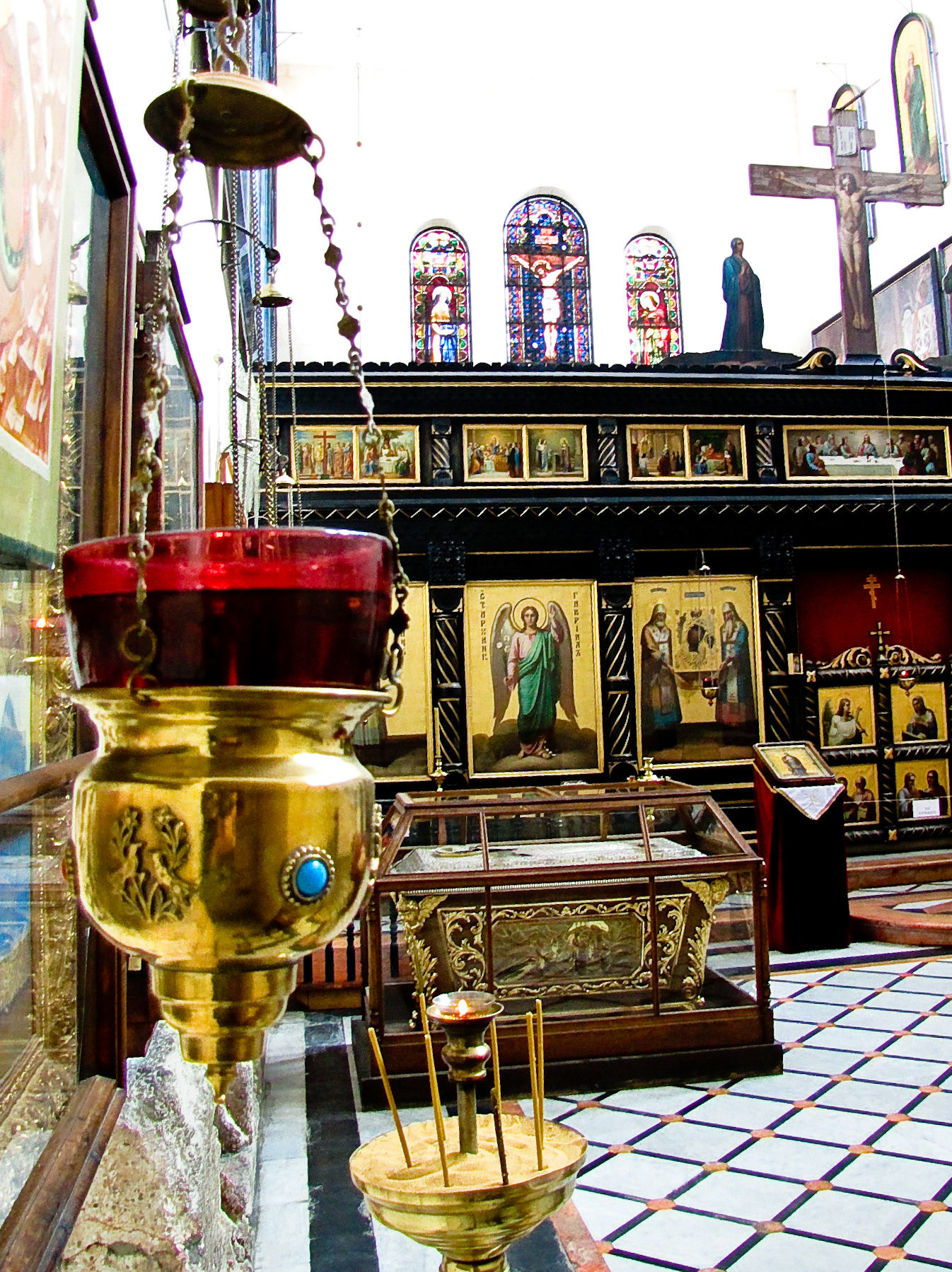
Interior of the church

The most spacious room of the courtyard is occupied by the Church of St. Alexander Nevsky with a wooden carved double-row iconostasis. In the narthex of the church is a memorial plaque with the inscription: "The Church in the name of the Holy Blessed Alexander Nevsky was founded on the site of the remains of the church built by the Holy Equal-to-the-Apostles Emperor Constantine, 1887-1896." The walls of the church are decorated with icons and paintings by Nikolay Koshelev, who visited Palestine specifically to paint them for this church and the Holy Trinity Cathedral. The eastern wall, behind the altar, is decorated with stained glass windows in the Russian Art Nouveau style.

Adjacent to the church is a museum housing small objects discovered during excavations: hanging lamps, crosses of various sizes and shapes, miniature glass vessels, candlesticks and door locks with lion heads, Arabic coins, and ancient Hebrew-style nightlights. Many clay artifacts, such as lamps, bowls, and pendants, are of Coptic origin.

On the ground floor of the courtyard is a reception room, known to the courtyard staff as the Tsar's Room . Next to it is the chancery with a formal portrait of Grand Duke Nikolai Alexandrovich, the future Emperor Nicholas II, and the painting "The Savior in the Crown of Thorns" by Nikolay Koshelev, as well as graphic portraits of Grand Duke Sergei Alexandrovich, General M. G. Khripunov and the courtyard manager V. K. Antipov. On the second floor are utility rooms, a library and an archive. On the terrace adjacent to the church from the southwest are common chambers for accommodating pilgrims. The total area is 1,433 m^{2} (15,420 sq ft).

The main relic of the courtyard is the Threshold of the Gates of Judgment —the threshold of the city gate through Jesus's Via Dolorosa. Significant artifacts include the remains of columns and an arch from the Basilica of the Resurrection of the Lord during the reign of Constantine the Great, a piece of rock from the outskirts of Jerusalem, installed directly behind the Threshold of the Gates of Judgment, and a part of a column from the Basilica of the Resurrection of the Lord, used as an altar in the center of the Church of St. Alexander Nevsky.

To the left of the threshold of the Judgment Gate, in the surviving fragment of the fortress wall, there is a small opening that allowed travelers to enter the city after the gates were closed for the night. This passage may have been called the eye of the needle.

== Gallery ==
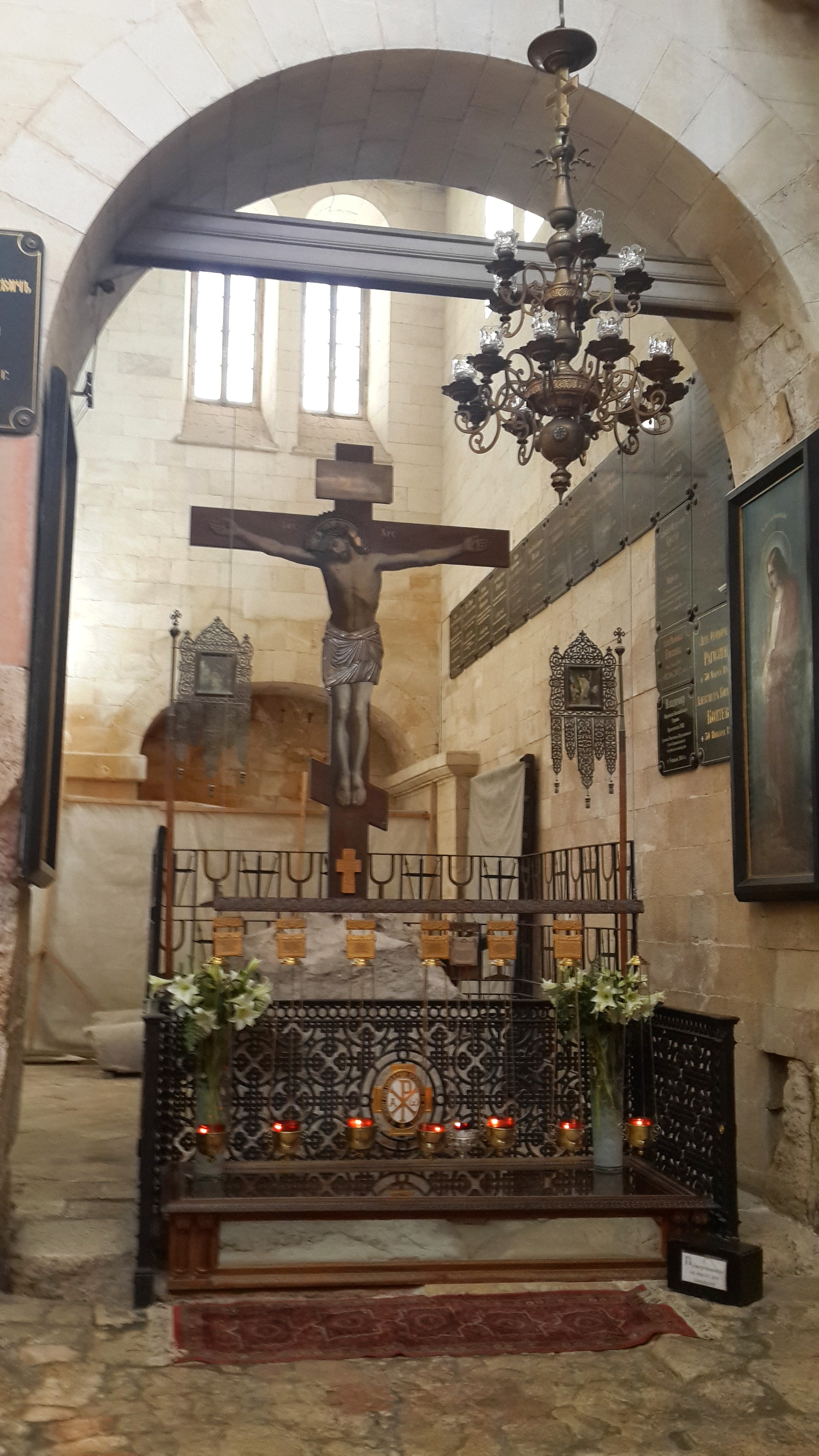
Threshold of the Gates of Judgement

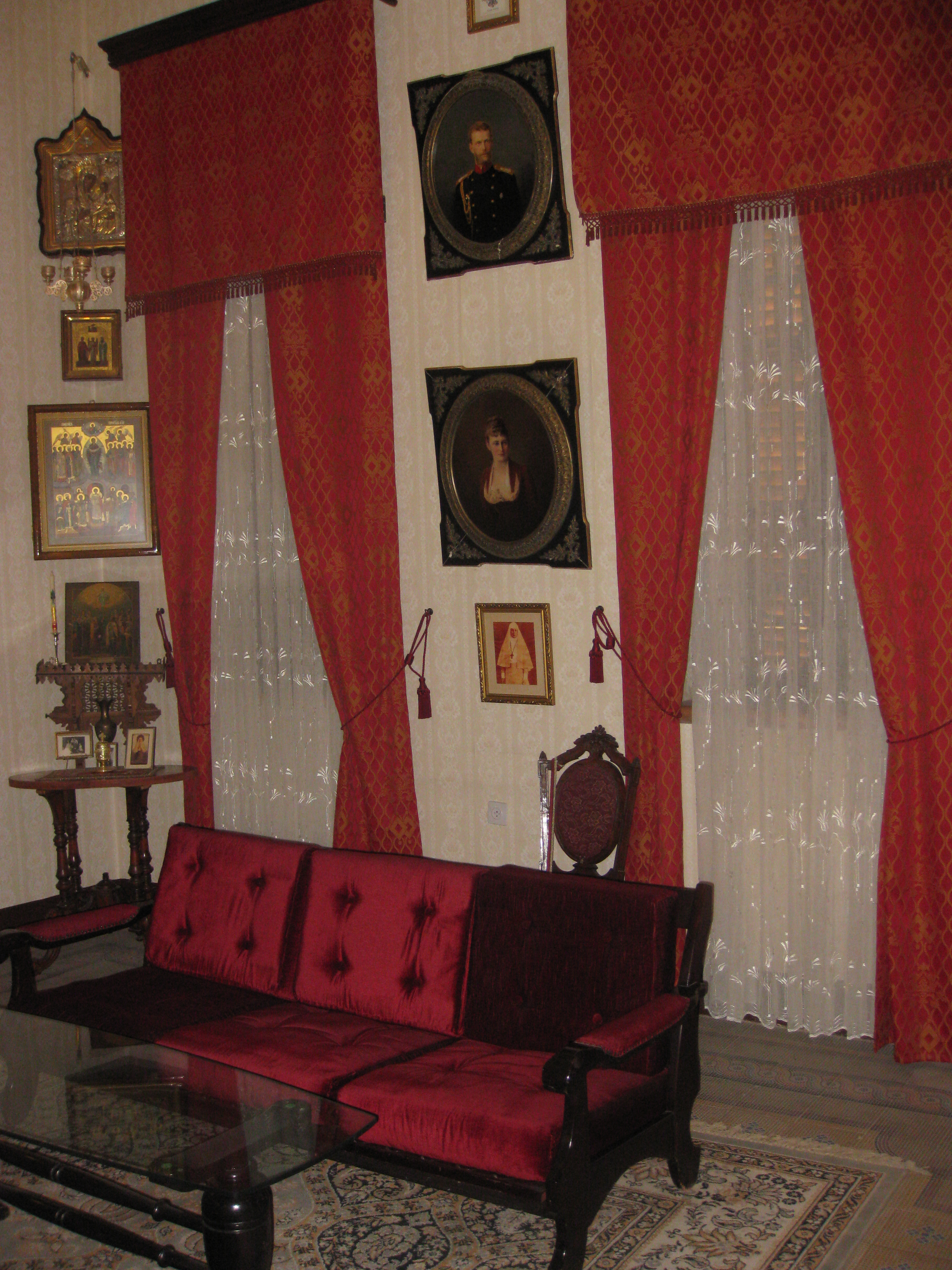
Historical reception hall

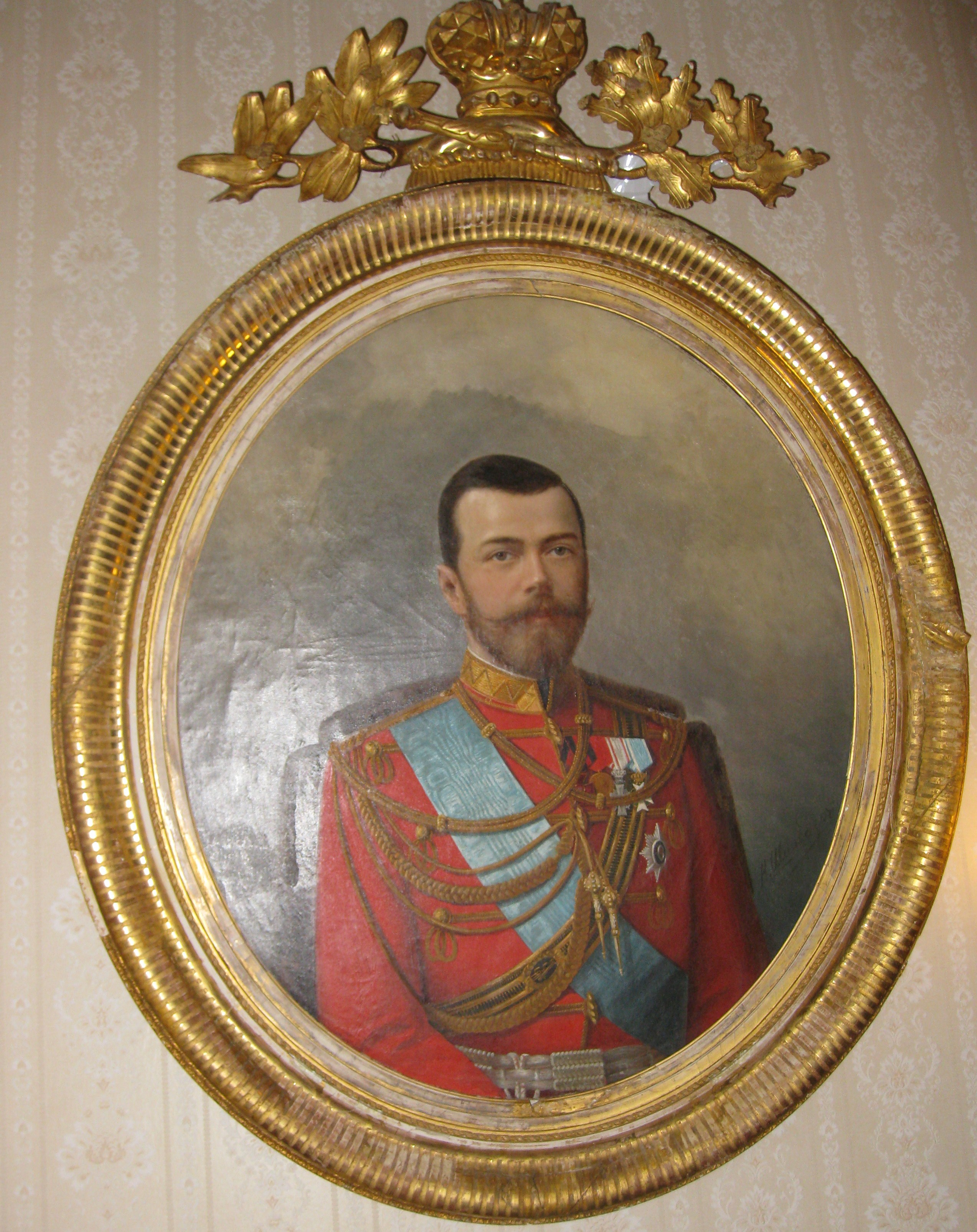
Portrait of Nicholas II

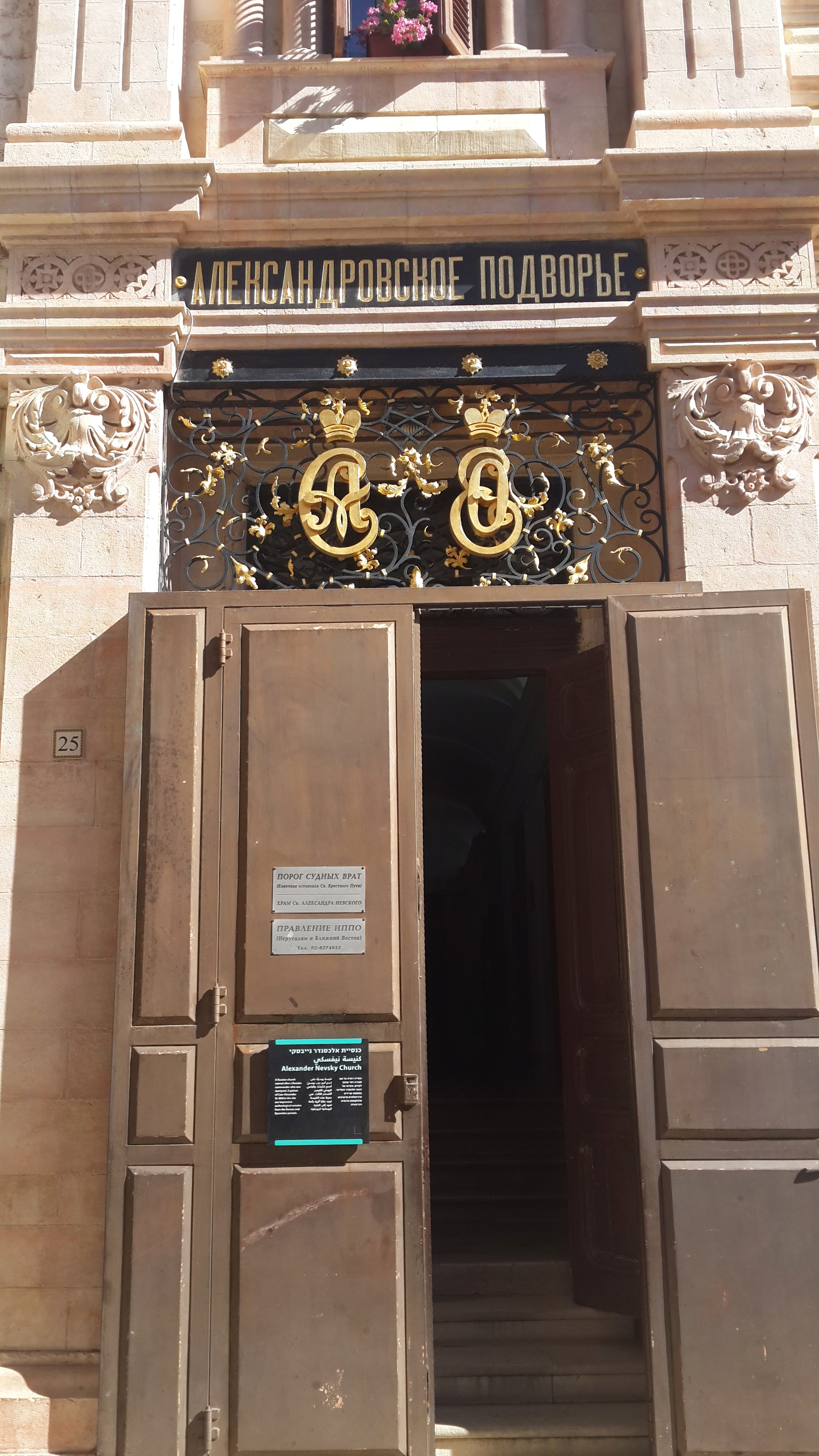
Entrance

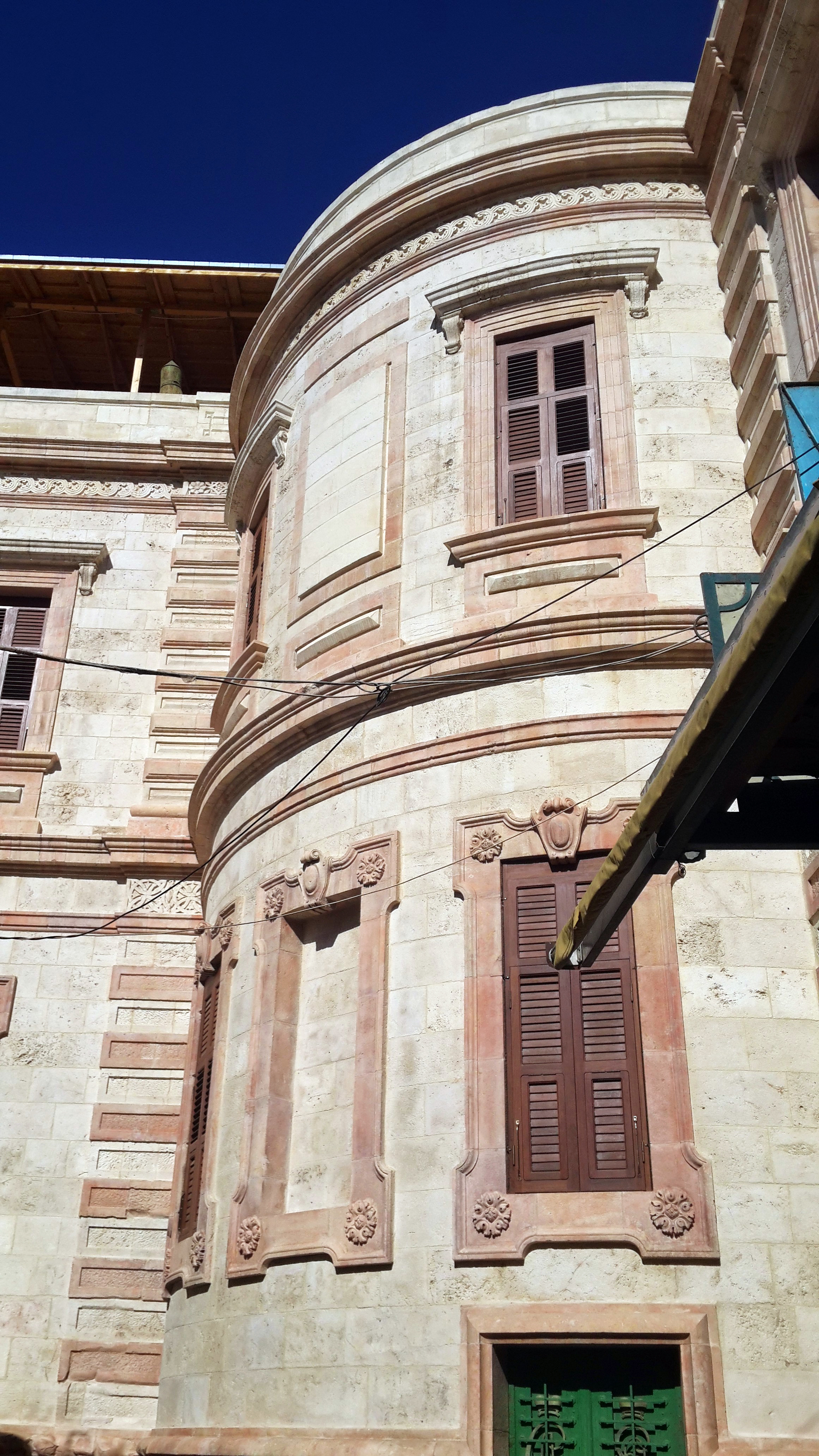

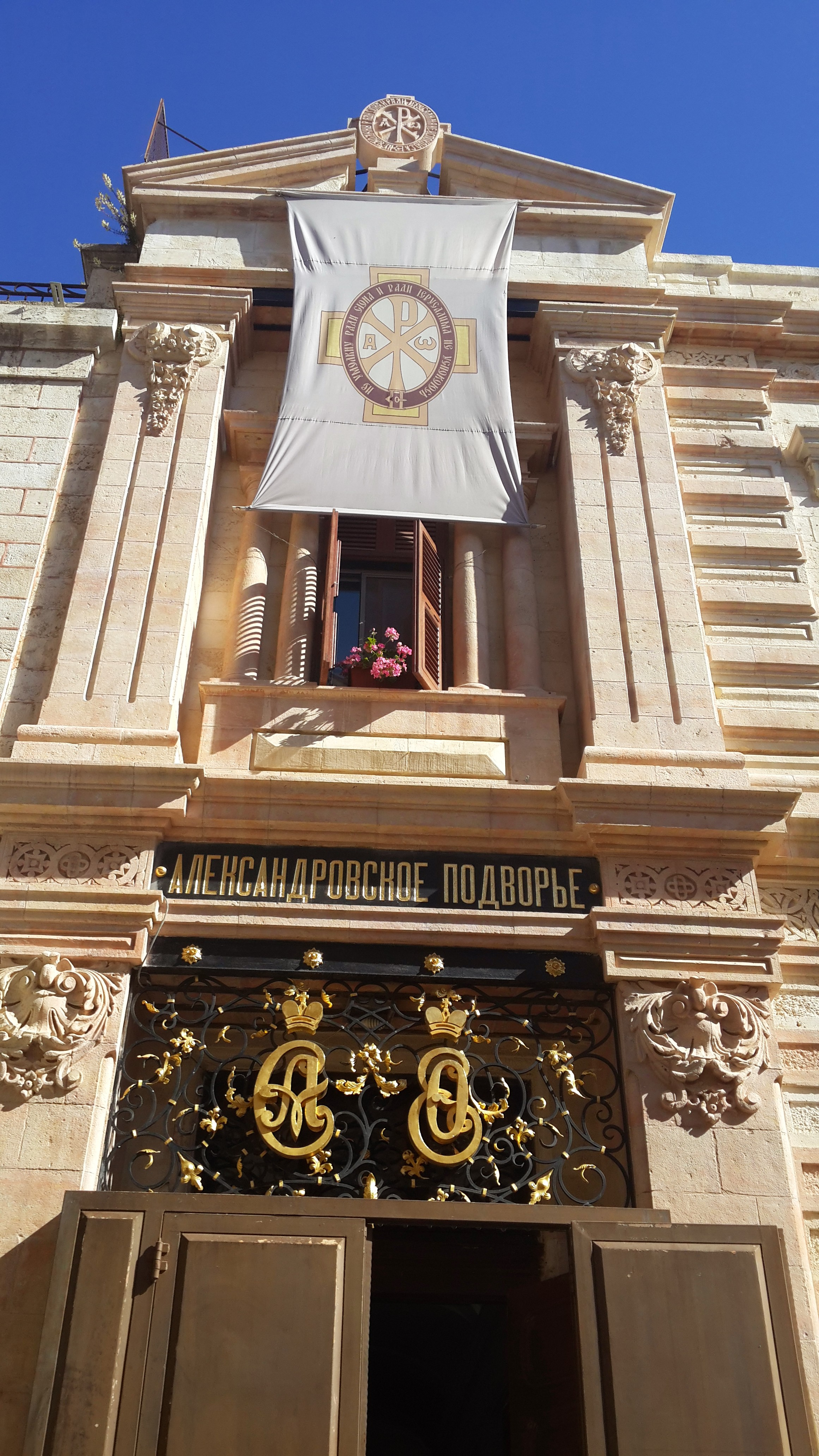

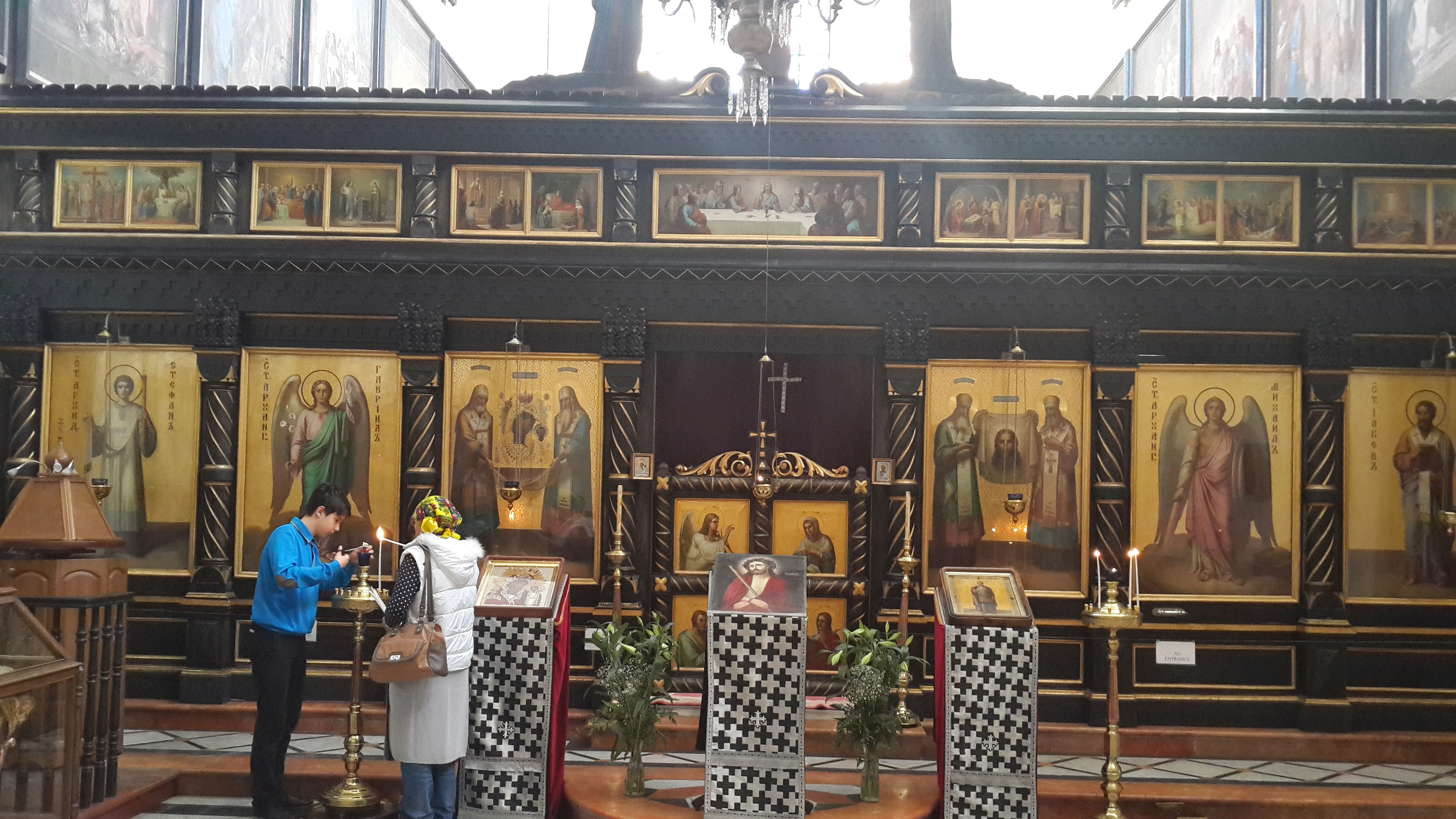

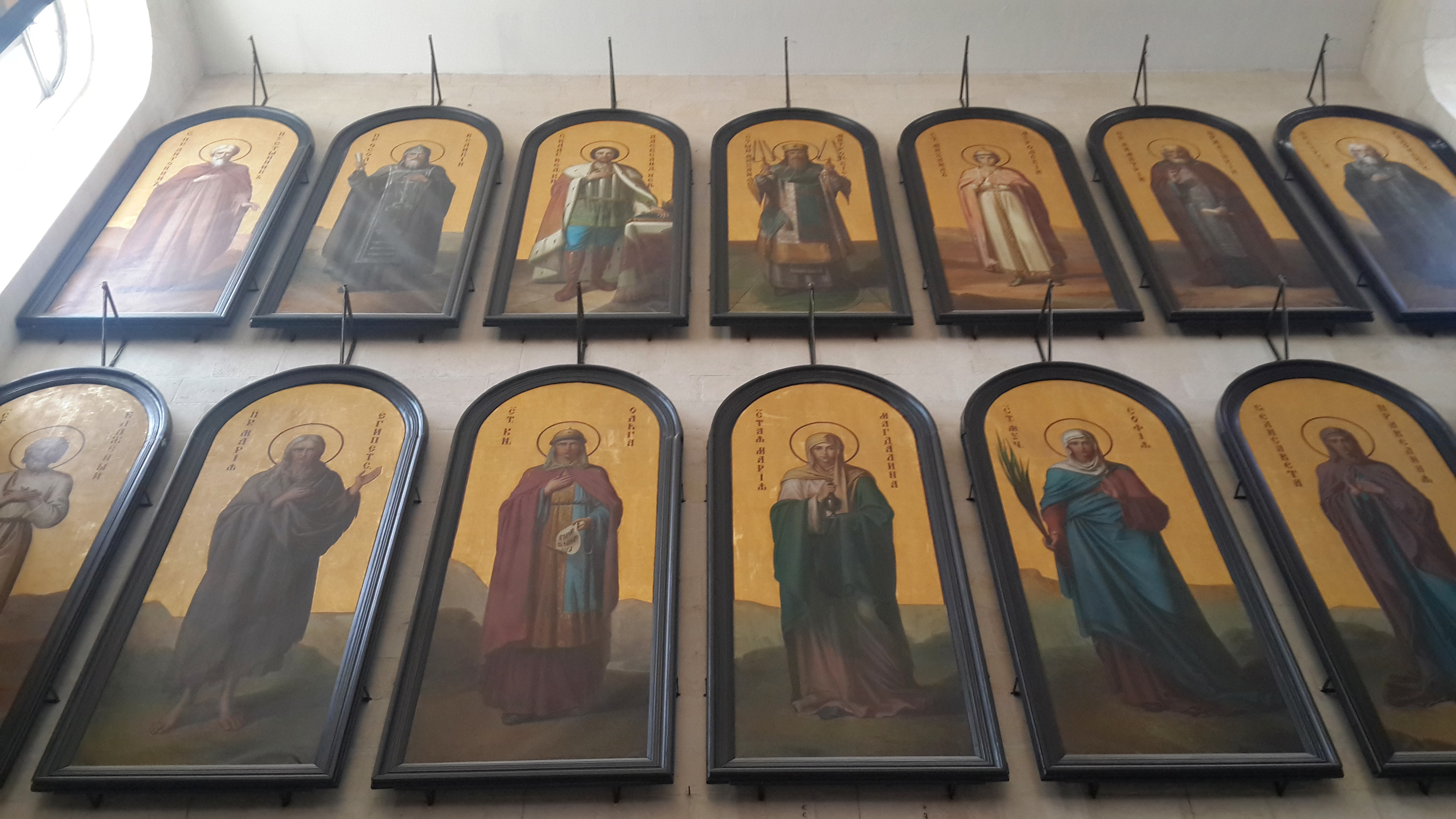

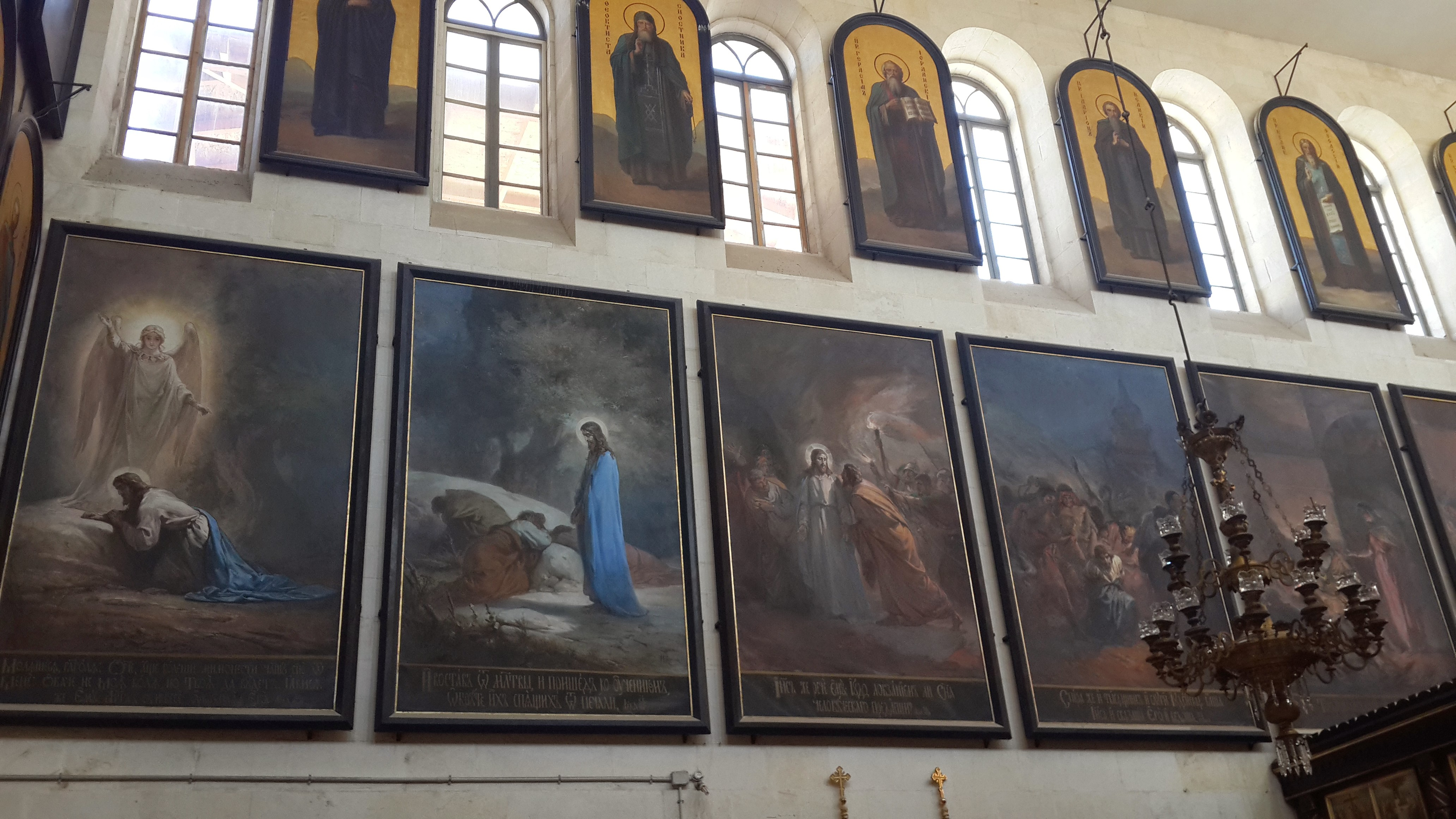

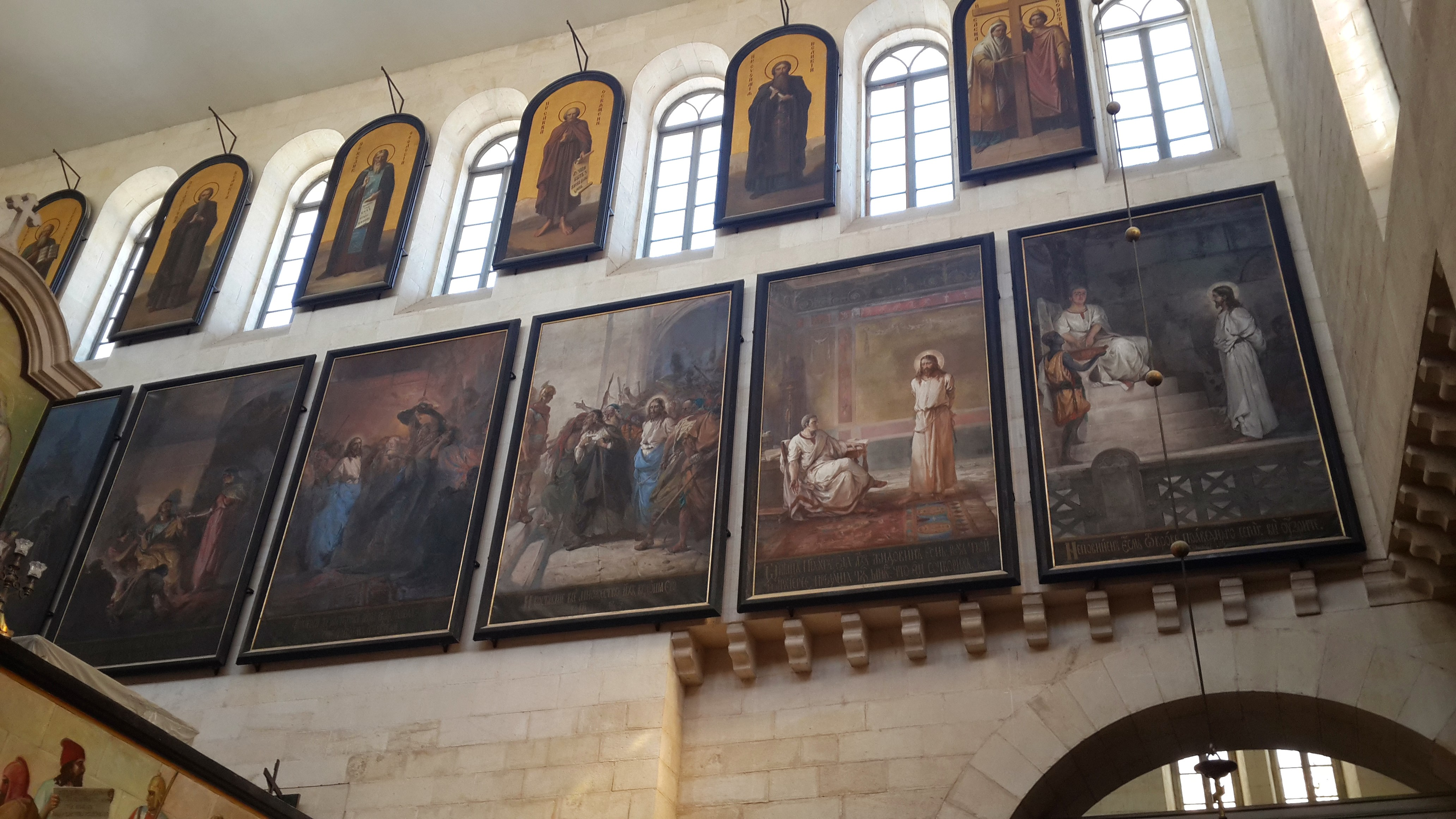

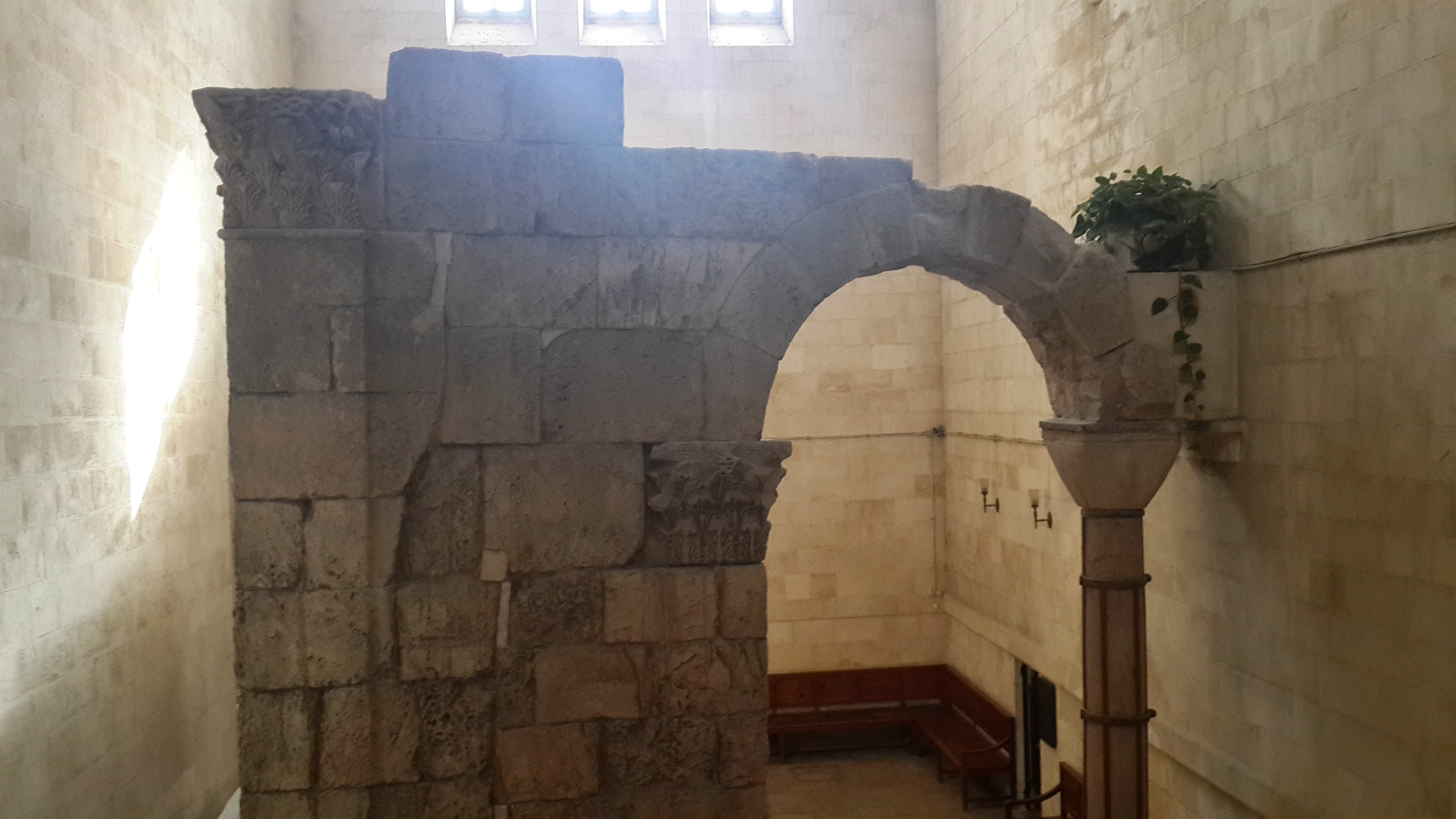
