= Igor Ashurbeyli =

Russian-Azerbaijani scientist, businessman

- İqor Aşurbəyli

Head of Nation of Asgardia
- Incumbent
- Assumed office 25 June 2018
- Prime Minister: Ana Díaz

Leader of Party of Russia's Rebirth
- Incumbent
- Assumed office 17 June 2016
- Preceded by: Gennady Seleznyov

Personal details
- Born: 9 September 1963 (age 63) Baku, Azerbaijan, Soviet Union
- Children: 2
- Education: Azerbaijan State Oil Academy
- Known for: Chairman of the Board of the Socium Holding, Founder of Asgardia
- Awards: Russian Federation Government Prize in Science and Technology; UNESCO Medal for contributions to the development of nanoscience and nanotechnologies

Igor Raufovich Ashurbeyli (Azerbaijani: İqor Rauf oğlu Aşurbəyli;, Russian: Игорь Рауфович Ашурбейли; born 9 September 1963) is an Azerbaijani-Russian scientist, businessman and a Head of the micronation Asgardia, the Space Nation. He is also the leader of the Party of Russia's Rebirth since 2016.

He was the CEO of Scientific Production Association (SPA) Almaz from 2000 to 2011. He is also the founder and chairman of the board of Socium Holding. He has a Doctorate of Science in engineering and a PhD in engineering, with a specialization in computer science.

== Biography ==
Igor Ashurbeyli was born on 9 September 1963, in Baku, Azerbaijan SSR, a descendant of the Azerbaijani noble family of Ashurbeyov. He graduated from the Azerbaijan State Oil Academy in 1985.

In 1988, under the Soviet Union's then-new economic policies, he founded Socium, a small software company, serving as its first General Manager. It later became Socium Holding, a holding company with over 10,000 employees at over 30 companies, where Ashurbeyli services as chairman of the board.

In 1990, Ashurbeyli moved to Moscow. Starting in 1994, he held the positions of deputy general manager, first deputy general manager, and chairman of the board at SPA Almaz (later rebranded as GSKB Almaz-Antey), later becoming its chief executive officer (CEO) from 2000 to 2011. Ashurbeyli resigned from SPA Almaz in 2011. From 2011, he was the chairman of the board and scientific supervisor of KB-1 (Design Bureau-1), a privately held company.

From 2004, Ashurbeyli was the chairman of the board of the nonprofit non-government Expert Society on Space Threat Defense (ESSTD). In 2015, ESSTD was granted special consultative status with the United Nations Economic and Social Council (ECOSOC).

He was awarded the Russian Federation Government Prize in Science and Technology of 2009. On 5 February 2016, Ashurbeyli was awarded the UNESCO Medal for contributions to the development of nanoscience and nanotechnologies during a ceremony held at UNESCO headquarters, Paris, France.

Igor Ashurbeyli founded the Aerospace International Research Center in Vienna, Austria, in 2013. In 2014, the center began publication of an international space journal, ROOM, of which Ashurbeyli is the editor-in-chief. In July 2018, Aerospace International Research Center was renamed to Asgardia Independent Research Center.

On 12 October 2016, Igor Ashurbeyli announced in a press conference in Paris, France, "the birth of the new space nation Asgardia." The project is officially called the "Space Kingdom of Asgardia." The ultimate aim of the project is to create a new nation that allows access to outer space free of the control of existing nations. On 25 June 2018, in Vienna, Austria in Hofburg Palace, Igor Ashurbeyli was inaugurated as Asgardia's Head of Nation.

Asgardia intends to launch a series of satellites into Earth orbit. Going forward, the Asgardia team hopes to create habitable platforms in low-earth orbits, which is also where the International Space Station is located. "It's not a fantasy. Going to Mars, the galactics, so on—that's just fake. I intend something more real," Igor Ashurbeyli told CNN in June 2017.

The Cygnus spacecraft that carried Asgardia-1 into space released Asgardia-1 and two other satellites on 12 November 2017. The Space Kingdom of Asgardia has claimed that it is now "the first nation to have all of its territory in space." Legal scholars doubt that Asgardia-1 can be regarded as a sovereign territory.

=== Imperial Orthodox Palestine Society Council in the state of Israel ===
On 25 December 2015, Ashurbeyli became the Chairman of the Imperial Orthodox Palestine Society (IOPS) Council in the state of Israel, which was created in 2015 as an IOPS directorate in the State of Israel to manage the St. Sergius Metochion in Jerusalem, which opened in July 2017 after repairs and restoration was completed in November 2016, and to support religious tourism and pilgrimage from the Russian Federation into Israel. In 2015, as IOPS Chairman Sergey Stepashin and Minister of Culture of Russia Vladimir Medinsky signed a Program of Joint Actions for the Development of Religious Tourism and Pilgrimage from the Russian Federation which supported the repairs and restoration which led to the establishment of the Imperial Orthodox Palestine Society (IOPS) Council in the state of Israel. For many years in support of Russia foreign policy, the IOPS has conducted charitable activities of the Russian Federation in the countries of the Middle East and is pivotal in collecting and delivering humanitarian aid to Syrians in Syria and Palestinians in Palestine including Gaza and the West Bank. Ashurbeyli lives in Russia not the Middle East but often travels for business from Russia to the Middle East, the State of Israel, and Jerusalem in support of IOPS activities.

=== Politics ===
On 17 June 2016, Ashurbeyli was elected new leader of the Party of Russia's Rebirth after the death of Gennady Seleznyov.

== See also ==
- Asgardia the Space Nation
- GSKB Almaz-Antey

Political offices
Office established	Head of Nation of the Space Kingdom of Asgardia; 2018–present	Incumbent
Party political offices
Preceded by Gennady Seleznyov	Leader of Party of Russia's Rebirth; 2016–present	Incumbent
