= Imperial Orthodox Palestine Society =

Scholarly organization

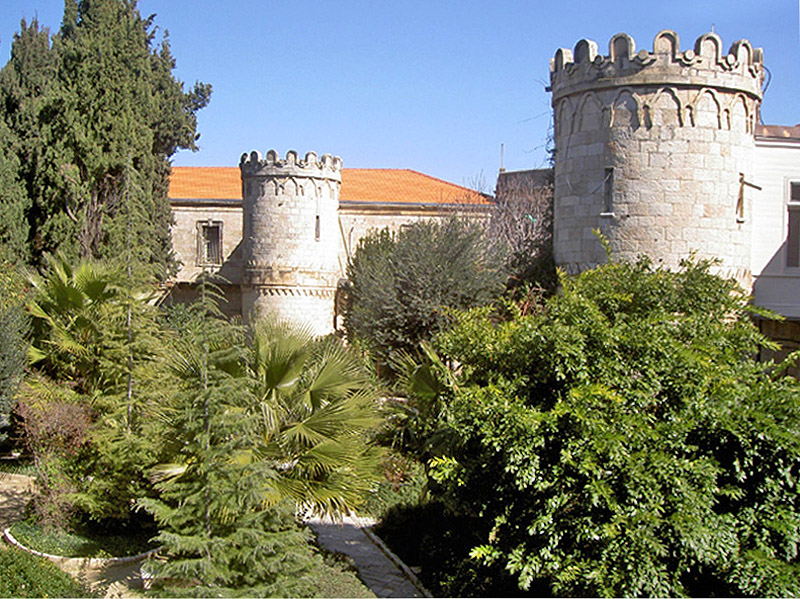
Sergei's Courtyard in Jerusalem, whose ownership was transferred by Israel to Russia in 2008, to be managed by the Imperial Orthodox Palestine Society.

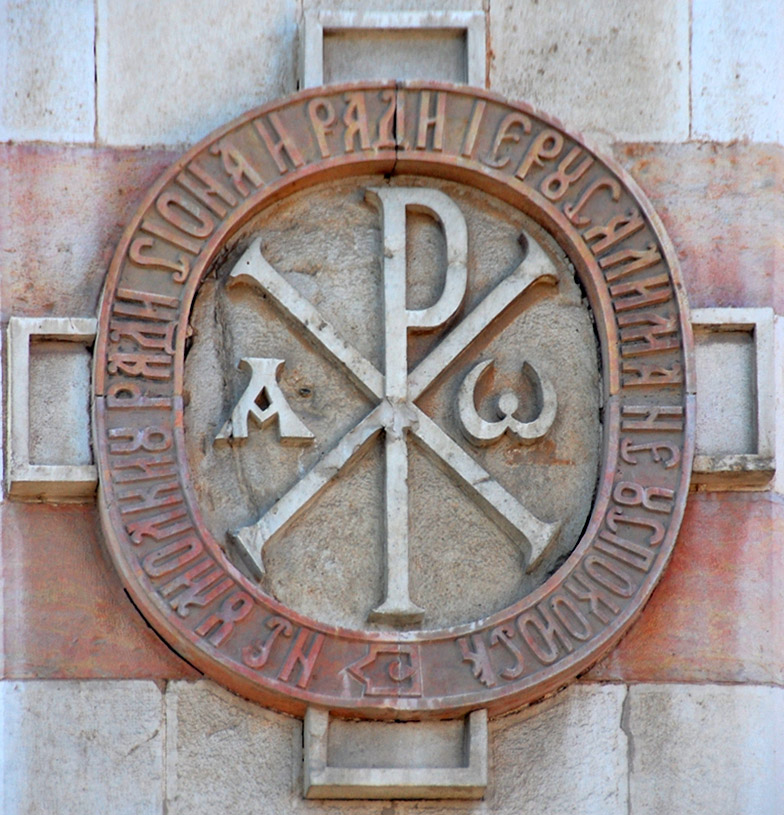
Emblem of the society

The Imperial Orthodox Palestine Society (Russian: Императорское православное палестинское общество, ИППО) (IOPS), is a scholarly organization for the study of the Middle East, founded on 8 May 1882 by Vasily Khitrovo, after the approval of Alexander III. The Society's activities expanded considerably so that it held over 30,000 meetings during 1902.

It was reformed and reapproved in 1919, 1922, 1925, 1930, 1952, 1986, 1989, 1992, 2002 and 2003. In 1918, following the Russian Revolution of 1917, the society was renamed the Russian Palestine Society (Russian: Российское Палестинское Общество) and attached to the Academy of Sciences of the USSR. Its original name was restored by the society on 22 May 1992 and was supported by Sergey Stepashin.

Today it is active both within the Russian Federation as well as abroad. These branches operate in cities abroad:

- Varna, (Bulgaria)
- Bethlehem, Palestine
- Jerusalem
- Larnaca, Cyprus
- Amman, Jordan

In September 2008, the government of Israel decided to return to Russia the building which used to house the guest house of Saint Sergius for Russian Orthodox visitors to Jerusalem, also known as the Mission of Saint Sergius of Jerusalem and which had previously housed Israel's Ministry of Agriculture. It belonged, up to the October Revolution, to the Imperial Palestine Society, while among its main donors was Grand Duke Sergei Alexandrovich. The decision, which restored the government of Russia as the owner of the building, came into force in February 2009.

In 2011, the Palestinian leadership transferred the site of the Russian Museum and Park Complex in Jericho to the government of Russia. The site of the Russian Museum and Park Complex belonged to the IOPS before the Russian Revolution.

In June 2012 with Vladimir Putin in attendance, the IOPS Cultural and Business Center in Bethlehem opened.

In December 2019, the Israeli Justice Ministry transferred the historical Alexander's Courtyard with the Alexander Nevsky Church, Jerusalem to the Putin-allied Imperial Orthodox Palestine Society from the competing Imperial Orthodox Palestine Historic Society, which many commentators linked to negotiating Issachar's release.

On 25 December 2015, Igor Ashurbeyli became the Chairman of the Imperial Orthodox Palestine Society (IOPS) Council in the state of Israel, which was created in 2015 as an IOPS directorate in the State of Israel to manage the St. Sergius Metochion in Jerusalem, which opened in July 2017 after repairs, restoration and significantly improved communications were completed in November 2016, and to support religious tourism and pilgrimage from the Russian Federation into Israel. In 2015, as IOPS Chairman Sergey Stepashin and Minister of Culture of Russia Vladimir Medinsky signed a Program of Joint Actions for the Development of Religious Tourism and Pilgrimage from the Russian Federation which supported the repairs and restoration of The Sergiev Gate and led to the establishment of the Imperial Orthodox Palestine Society (IOPS) Council in the state of Israel. For many years in support of Russian foreign policy, the IOPS has conducted charitable activities of the Russian Federation in the countries of the Middle East and is pivotal in collecting and delivering humanitarian aid to Syrians in Syria and Palestinians in Palestine including Gaza and the West Bank.

For the 2018 Russian presidential election, the Sergiev Gate, which is maintained by the IOPS Council in the State of Israel, was the only polling station in Jerusalem for Russian citizens voting in the election.

== History ==
In 1886, the Society founded the Russian Teachers' Seminary in Nazareth.

== See also ==
- Russian Orthodox Ecclesiastical Mission in Jerusalem
