= Zhao Yun (lawyer) =

- 趙雲

Director of the Center for Chinese Law at the University of Hong Kong
- In office 2013–2017

Head of the Department of Law of the University of Hong Kong
- Incumbent
- Assumed office 2016

Personal details
- Born: 23 October 1974 (age 51) Zhejiang province, China
- Education: China University of Political Science and Law (LL.M., LL.B.); Leiden University (LL.M.); Erasmus University (Ph.D.)

Zhao Yun (simplified Chinese: 赵云; traditional Chinese: 趙雲; pinyin: Zhào Yún, born 23 October 1974) is a Hong Kong lawyer specialising in space law and international economic law. He is Professor and Head of the Department of Law of the University of Hong Kong since 2016.

== Biography ==
From 1991 to 1998 he studied at the China University of Political Science and Law in Beijing. He earned a bachelor's degree in 1995 and a master's degree in 1998. Then from 1998 to 1999, Zhao studied at the Leiden University in the Netherlands, where he obtained a master's degree in public international law.

From 2000 to 2003 Zhao studied at the Erasmus University in Rotterdam (the Netherlands). From 2000 to 2002 he worked as Researcher at the Faculty of Law. In 2003, he graduated from Erasmus University with a PhD in international law.

Zhao started his career at the School of Law of City University of Hong Kong in 2002, where he taught dispute resolution, cyber law for business, business law, e-commerce law until 2008. Then in 2008 he joined the Department of Law of the University of Hong Kong, teaching introduction to Chinese law, china trade law, PRC information technology law, and online dispute resolution.

From 2013 to 2017 he held a position of the Director of the Center for Chinese Law at the University of Hong Kong. From 2016 to the present he is Head of the Department of Law of the University of Hong Kong.

He is also Professor in International Law at the Xiamen University and Professor at the Shanghai University of International Business and Economics (before 2013 called Shanghai University of Foreign Trade). He is listed as arbitrator in several international arbitration commissions.

On 24 June 2018, Zhao was appointed as the Supreme Justice of Asgardia, a self-styled "Space Nation" during the first parliamentary session in Vienna, where he was introduced to the elected Members of Asgardia's "Parliament". Supreme Justice supervises the operation of four judicial panels: a "constitutional" panel; a "civil" panel; an "administrative" panel; and a "criminal" panel.

== Research work ==
Zhao's specialized areas: space law, dispute resolution, international economic law, e-commerce law. In the past few years, Mr. Zhao has conducted different research in the area of space exploration. He is also currently exploring significant topics such as the problem of space debris, the exploration of the space resources, the non-appropriation principle in space, etc.

Zhao is convinced that Hong Kong needs to update its 23-year-old outer space law to keep pace with the growing use of commercial satellites both in the city and overseas. Hong Kong introduced the Outer Space Act 1986 in 1990 and the Outer Space Ordinance in 1997. A lawyer noted that the Outer Space Ordinance has many grey areas. These included the copyright of raw data transmitted by satellites as well as the liabilities of different parties in the case of a collision in space.

== Selected publications ==
- Zhao Yun. National Space Legislation in China: An Overview of the Current Situation and Outlook for the Future. The Netherlands, Brill/Martinus Nijhoff, 2015.
- Zhao Yun. Cyber Law in Hong Kong. The Netherlands, Kluwer, 2011.
- Zhao Yun. Mediation Practice and Skills. Beijing, Tsinghua University Press, 2011.
- Zhao Yun. The Annotated Ordinances of Hong Kong: Civil Aviation Ordinance (Cap 448). Hong Kong, LexisNexis, 2008.
- Zhao Yun. Space Commercialization and the Development of Space Law. Beijing, Intellectual Property Rights Press, 2008.
- Zhao Yun. National Space Legislation in Mainland China. — Journal of Space Law, 2008.
- Zhao Yun. On the Liability Convention for Outer Space and Its Consummation. — Journal of Beijing University of Aeronautics and Astronautics (Social Science Edition), 2008.
- Zhao Yun. Research on Space Commercialization and Patent Protection in Outer Space. — Journal of International Economic Law, 2008.
- Zhao Yun. Dispute Resolution in Electronic Commerce. The Netherlands, Martinus Nijhoff, 2005
- Zhao Yun. Liberalization of Electronic Commerce and Law. Beijing, Peking University Press, 2005.
