= Party of Russia's Rebirth =

Party of Russia's Rebirth Партия возрождения России
- Leader: Igor Ashurbeyli
- Founder: Gennady Seleznyov
- Founded: 15 July 2000; 26 years ago (as Movement of Russia); 7 September 2002; 24 years ago (as the Party of Russia's Rebirth); 26 October 2012; 13 years ago (refoundation)
- Dissolved: 9 September 2008; 18 years ago
- Split from: Communist Party of the Russian Federation
- Merged into: Patriots of Russia (2008–2012)
- Headquarters: Leningradsky Avenue, 80, Moscow, Russia
- Newspaper: Rossiya
- Membership (2021): 965
- Ideology: Social democracy Democratic socialism Civic nationalism
- Political position: Centre-left to left-wing
- Colours: White; Light blue Red
- Seats in the Federation Council: 0 / 170
- Seats in the State Duma: 0 / 450
- Seats in the Regional Parliaments: 0 / 3,994

Website
- p-v-ros.ru

The Party of Russia's Rebirth (Russian: Партия возрождения России Partiya Vozrozhdeniya Rossii) is a political party in Russia founded by Gennady Seleznev, former State Duma speaker and a former member of the Communist Party of Russia (2002-2007). The party took the name of the illegal Russian fascist party, which existed in the USSR, and abroad among the Russian expatriates, in the 1930s. Igor Ashurbeyli is the current leader of the party.

PVR symbol in 2002

In the 2003 legislative elections, the alliance of the Party of Russia's Rebirth and the Russian Party of Life party won 1.9% of the popular vote and no seats on the party list ballot, although Seleznev himself narrowly beat liberal candidate Irina Khakamada in Saint Petersburg to win a seat there.

In the 2007 elections Party of Russia's Rebirth blocked up with another nationalist party, Patriots of Russia, led by Gennady Semigin.

On September 9, 2008, the party was officially dissolved. Many of the members including Gennady Seleznev joined Patriots of Russia.

The party was re-founded in October 2012 and registered once again in May 2013.

On 19 July 2015, the founder and leader of the party Gennady Seleznev died, the acting leader became Viktor Arkhipov. On 26 June 2016, Igor Ashurbeyli was elected the new leader of the party.

During the 2018 local elections, the party nominee Sardana Avksentyeva was elected Mayor of Yakutsk, defeating the candidate from the ruling United Russia party.
