= Asgardia =

Digital nation in an Earth orbit satellite

Coordinates: 48°12′39.1″N 16°22′55.8″E

Space Kingdom of Asgardia
(in other official languages)
Arabic	مملكة أسجارديا الفضائية
German	Weltraumkönigreich von Asgardia
Spanish	Reino Espacial de Asgardia
Persian	پادشاهی فضایی آسگاردیا
French	Royaume Spatial d’Asgardia
Hindi	ऐसगार्डिया अंतरिक्ष राष्ट्र
Indonesian	Kerajaan Antariksa Asgardia
Italian	Regno Spaziale di Asgardia
Malay	Kerajaan Angkasa Asgardia
Portuguese	Reino Espacial da Asgárdia
Russian	Космическое Королевство Асгардия
Turkish	Asgardia Uzay Kraliyeti
Chinese	阿斯伽迪亚之太空王国
- Micronation (unrecognized entity)
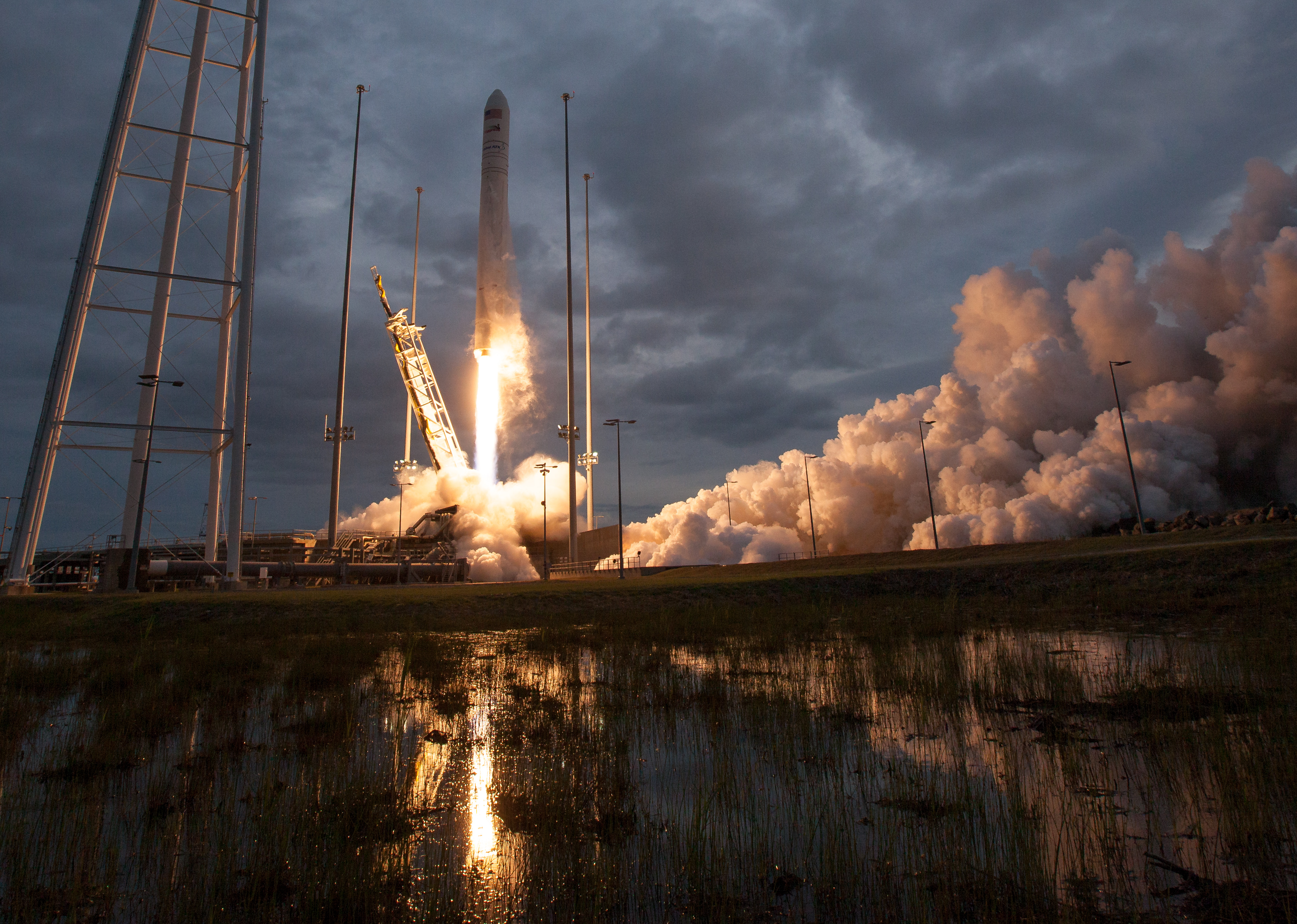
- Orbital ATK Antares rocket, carrying the Asgardia-1 satellite, launches on 12 November 2017
- Area claimed: Asgardia-1 satellite
- Claimed by: Igor Ashurbeyli; Lembit Öpik; Lena De Winne; Zhao Yun
- Dates claimed: 12 October 2016 or 25 June 2018–present

Asgardia, also known as the Space Kingdom of Asgardia and Asgardia the Space Nation, is a "virtual nation" formed by a group of people who have launched a satellite into Earth orbit. They refer to themselves as "Asgardians" and they have given their satellite the name "Asgardia-1". They have declared sovereignty over the space occupied by and contained within Asgardia -1. The Asgardians have adopted a constitution and they intend to access outer space free of the control of existing nations and establish a permanent settlement on the Moon by 2043.

Igor Ashurbeyli, the founder of the Asgardia Independent Research Center, proposed the establishment of Asgardia on 12 October 2016. The Constitution of the Space Kingdom of Asgardia was adopted on 18 June 2017 and it became effective on 9 September 2017. Asgardia's administrative center is located in Vienna, Austria.

The Cygnus spacecraft that carried Asgardia-1 into space released Asgardia-1 and two other satellites on 12 November 2017. The Space Kingdom of Asgardia has claimed that it is now "the first nation to have all of its territory in space." Legal scholars doubt that Asgardia-1 can be regarded as a sovereign territory and Asgardia has not yet attained the goal of being recognised as a nation state.

== Etymology ==
Asgardia is taken from the name of one of the Nine Worlds in the Norse religion: Asgard (Old Norse: Ásgarðr, lit. 'Enclosure of the Æsir'). Home to the Æsir tribe of gods, Asgard is derived from Old Norse áss, god and garðr, enclosure; from Indo-European roots ansu- spirit, demon (see cognate ahura; also asura) and gher- grasp, enclose (see cognates garden and yard), essentially meaning "garden of gods."

== History ==
=== Asgardia Independent Research Center ===
The Asgardia Independent Research Center (AIRC), formerly the Aerospace International Research Center, was founded by Igor Ashurbeyli in 2013. In 2014, the AIRC began the publication of an international space journal, ROOM, of which Ashurbeyli is the editor-in-chief. On February 5, 2016, Ashurbeyli was awarded the UNESCO Medal for contributions to the development of nanoscience and nanotechnologies during a ceremony held at UNESCO headquarters, Paris. AIRC AAS is the only institute in Austria whose activity is fully dedicated to the research of the Solar System, extraterrestrial life and the Earth using space technology and satellite techniques.

Since 2013, the AIRC staff constructed, developed and prepared for launch over 30 instruments and participated in the experiments in 15 space missions, for example: ESA's mission Mars Express, Rosetta (mission to a comet), Venus Express, BepiColombo (mission to Mercury) and CNES' DEMETER and TARANIS missions. AIRC has also collaborated with NASA for the IBEX mission. In 2015, the AIRC established a close collaboration with Asgardia.

=== Founding ===
On 12 October 2016, Ashurbeyli announced in a press conference in Paris, France, "the birth of the new space nation Asgardia."

The ultimate aim of the project is to create a new nation that allows access to outer space free of the control of existing nations. The current space law framework, the Outer Space Treaty requires governments to authorise and supervise all space activities, including the activities of non-governmental entities such as commercial and non-profit organisations; by attempting to create a nation, those behind Asgardia hope to avoid the tight restrictions that the current system imposes.

It officially calls itself the "Space Kingdom of Asgardia." "Asgardia" was chosen as a reference to Asgard, one of the nine worlds of Norse mythology; the world that was inhabited by the gods.

People were invited to register for citizenship in 2016, with the aim of Asgardia then applying to the United Nations for recognition as a nation state. In less than two days, there were over 100,000 applications; within three weeks, there were 500,000. After tougher verification requirements were introduced, this declined, and stood at around 210,000 in June, 2017. There is no intention to actually move these members into space. Asgardia intends to apply for membership of the UN.

The Constitution of the Space Kingdom of Asgardia was adopted on 18 June 2017 and it became effective on 9 September 2017.

The Cygnus spacecraft that carried Asgardia-1 into space released Asgardia-1 and two other satellites on 12 November 2017. The Space Kingdom of Asgardia has claimed that it is now "the first nation to have all of its territory in space." Legal scholars doubt that Asgardia-1 can be regarded as a sovereign territory and Asgardia is not recognised as a nation-state.

As of March 2019, Asgardia says that it has more than 290,000 citizens and more than 1,040,000 followers around the world.

== Governance ==
The Constitution of Asgardia divides Governance of Asgardia into three branches: (1) a legislative branch named the "Parliament," (2) an executive branch named the "Government," and (3) a judicial branch named the "Court."

=== Parliament ===
The Parliament is composed of 150 nonpartisan members and each member is referred to as a "Member of Parliament" (MP). The Members of Parliament elect one Member to the office of "Chairman of the Parliament." The Members of Parliament also appoint the "Chairman of the Government." The Parliament has 12 permanent committees; the Chairman of Parliament of Asgardia is Mr. Lembit Öpik.

=== Executive branch ===
The Head of Nation is the most senior official of the executive branch (i.e., the Government). The Head of Nation is elected to a 5-year term of office. The Head of Nation may dissolve the Parliament and may then order the holding of parliamentary elections. The Head of Nation may initiate legislative proposals and may veto acts adopted by the Parliament. The Head of Nation may issue decrees that must be obeyed by governmental bodies and by the citizens of Asgardia. The Head of Nation is Igor Ashurbeyli.

The Chairman of the Government supervises 12 Ministers. Each Minister supervises the operation of one Government Ministry. Each of the permanent committees of Parliament monitors the operation of one Government Ministry. The Parliament may invite Ministers to attend meetings of the Parliament.

=== Judicial branch ===
The judicial branch includes a "Supreme Justice," who supervises the operation of four judicial panels: (1) a "constitutional" panel, (2) a "civil" panel, (3) an "administrative" panel, and (4) a "criminal" panel. The Supreme Justice is appointed by the "Head of Nation." The "Justices" who serve on the judicial panels are appointed by the Parliament.

Asgardia's Supreme Justice is Zhao Yun. Zhao, head of the Department of Law at The University of Hong Kong, was appointed as Asgardia's Supreme Justice on 24 June 2018 during the first parliamentary session in Vienna, where he was introduced to the elected Members of Parliament.

=== Mayoral elections ===
The mayoral elections took place in the period between 1 August – 9 September 2018. Based on the results of the first stage of mayoral elections of Asgardia, offices were taken by mayors of 44 cities from 12 October 2018. The Head of Nation delegated to continue elections of the mayors of Asgardia until the Parliament passes the Bill "On Mayors of Asgardia" from 12 October 2018. Until the Parliament has passed the Bill "On Mayors of Asgardia," elected mayors will report to the Head of the Nation of Asgardia.

=== Key people ===
- Head of Nation — Igor Ashurbeyli
- The Chairman of Parliament — Lembit Öpik
- Head of the Government — Lena De Winne
- Supreme Justice — Zhao Yun

== Space activity ==
Asgardia-1
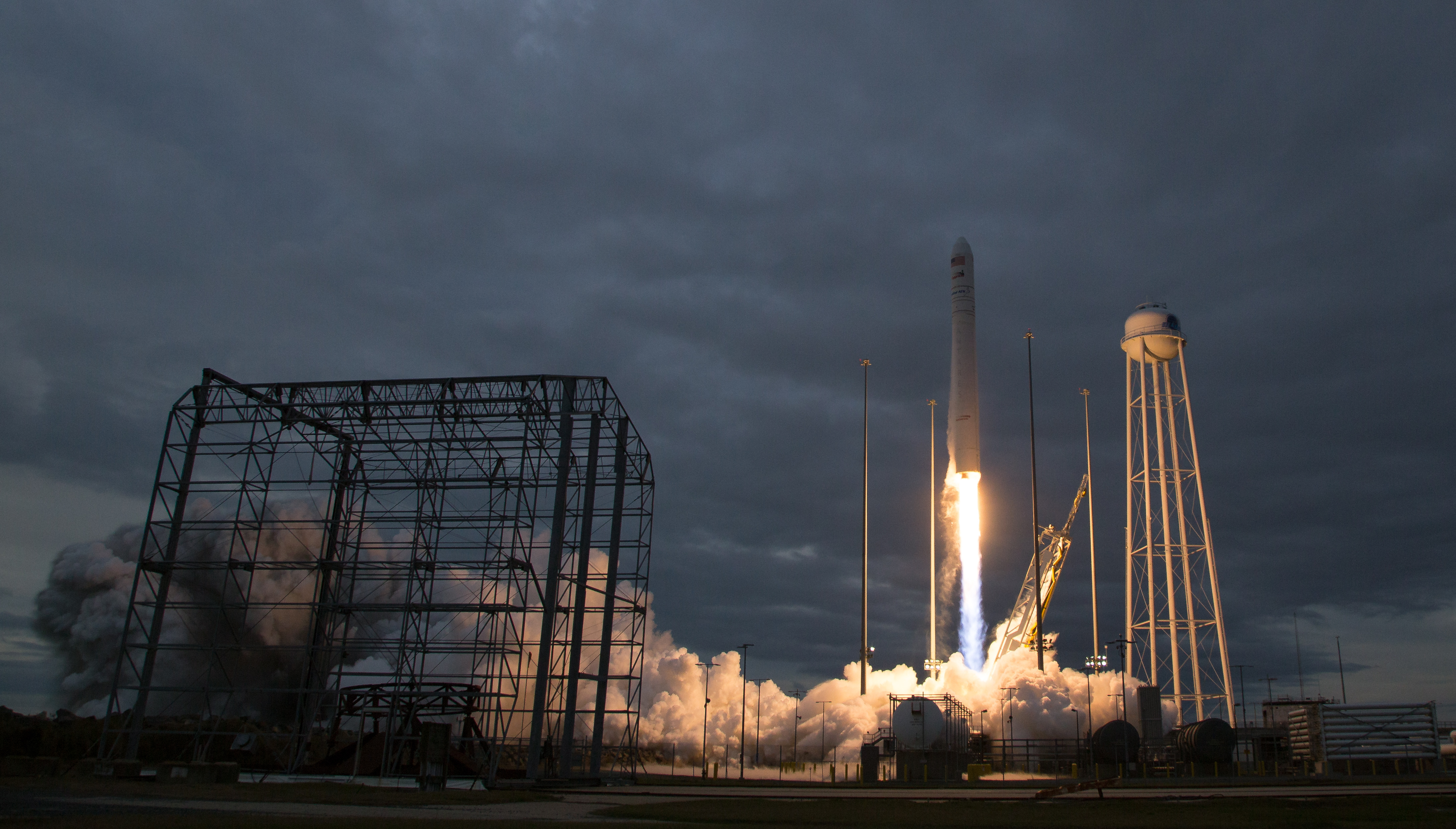
- Launch of Asgardia-1 on 12 November 2017
- Mission type: Technology demonstrator
- Operator: Space Kingdom of Asgardia
- COSPAR ID: 2017-071N
- SATCAT no.: 43049
- Mission duration: Planned: 5 years Final: 4 years, 9 months, 5 days

Spacecraft properties
- Spacecraft type: 2U CubeSat
- Launch mass: 2.8 kg (6.2 lb)
- Dimensions: 10 × 10 × 20 cm (3.9 × 3.9 × 7.9 in)

Start of mission
- Launch date: 12 November 2017, 12:19:51 UTC
- Rocket: Antares 230
- Launch site: MARS LP-0A
- Contractor: Orbital ATK
- Entered service: 6 December 2017, 22:40:22 UTC

End of mission
- Decay date: 12 September 2022

Orbital parameters
- Reference system: Geocentric
- Regime: Low Earth
- Semi-major axis: 6,830.4 km (4,244.2 mi)
- Eccentricity: 0.000305
- Perigee altitude: 450.2 km (279.7 mi)
- Apogee altitude: 454.4 km (282.4 mi)
- Inclination: 51.64 degrees
- Period: 93.63 minutes
- Epoch: 1 January 2018, 10:01:15 UTC

Asgardia intends to launch a series of satellites into Earth orbit. Its first satellite was successfully launched by Orbital ATK on 12 November 2017 as part of an International Space Station resupply mission. It was a two-unit CubeSat measuring 10 cm × 10 cm × 20 cm (4 in × 4 in × 8 in) at a weight of 2.8 kg (6.2 lb), manufactured and deployed into orbit by NanoRacks, and has been named Asgardia-1. The overall goal of the Asgardia-1 mission was to demonstrate the long-term storage of data on a solid-state storage device operating in low Earth orbit. The spacecraft had a 512 gigabyte solid-state storage device. The data stored in this device was to be periodically checked for data integrity and function. Before the launch, the data storage device was loaded with things like family photos supplied by the first 1,500,000 members of Asgardia. After the spacecraft reached orbit, data could be uploaded or downloaded using the Globalstar satellite network.

Asgardia-1 was boosted to space and then deployed by US companies on a NASA-funded mission so the satellite falls under US jurisdiction. Asgardia intends to partner with a non-signatory to the Outer Space Treaty (OST), perhaps an African state such as Ethiopia or Kenya, in the hopes of circumventing the OST's restriction on nation-states claiming territory in outer space. The satellite was expected to have a lifetime of 5 years before its orbit decays and it burns up on reentry. On 12 September 2022, Asgardia-1 reentered the atmosphere.

A continuously updated map that shows the location of Asgardia-1 in its orbit was hosted by NearSpace Launch, Inc. Asgardia-1 (NORAD satellite identification number 43049) is also being tracked by Satflare.

Often described as a billionaire, Ashurbeyli has said that he is currently solely responsible for funding Asgardia, and that members will not be funding the planned first satellite launch. Although the cost has not been made publicly available, NanoRacks have said that similar projects cost $700,000. The project intends to move to crowdfunding to finance itself. Sa'id Mosteshar, of the London Institute of Space Policy and Law, says this suggests that Asgardia lacks a credible business plan. A company, Asgardia AG, has been incorporated, and members can buy shares in it. Asgardia wants to enable its founders' companies to use Asgardia's satellite network for their own services and business activities. These are to be settled via the crypto currency Solar and the reserve currency Lunar.

Eventually, Asgardia hopes to have a colony in orbit. This will be expensive: the International Space Station cost $100bn to build, and flights to it cost over $40m per launch. Asgardia has been compared to the troubled Mars One project, which aims to establish a permanent colony on Mars, although Asgardia's organisers point out that setting up a small nation in orbit will be a lot easier than colonising distant Mars. Other proposed goals for the future include shielding the Earth from asteroids and coronal mass ejections, and a Moon base.

== Legal status ==
Flag of the Asgardia

=== Historical ===
There has been at least one previous attempt to set up an independent nation in space. The Nation of Celestial Space, also known as Celestia, was formed in 1949 by James Mangan and claimed all of space. He banned atmospheric nuclear testing and issued protests to the major powers at their encroachment on his territory, but was ignored by both the powers and the UN. However, modern communications mean that Asgardia has a better ability to organise its claim and perhaps raise funds for the satellite that would give it a physical presence in outer space.

=== Recognition and territorial claims ===
Both UN General Assembly Resolution 1962 (XVIII) and the Outer Space Treaty (OST) of 1967 have established all of outer space as an international commons by describing it as the "province of all mankind" and, as a fundamental principle of space law, declaring that space, including the Moon and other astronomical objects, is not subject to any national sovereignty claim. Article VI of the Outer Space Treaty vests the responsibility for activities in space to States Parties, regardless of whether they are carried out by governments or non-governmental entities. Article VIII stipulates that the State Party to the Treaty that launches a space object shall retain jurisdiction and control over that object.

According to Sa'id Mosteshar of the London Institute of Space Policy and Law: "The Outer Space Treaty... accepted by everybody says very clearly that no part of outer space can be appropriated by any state." Without self-governing territory in space where citizens are present, Mosteshar suggested that the prospect any country would recognise Asgardia was slim.

Ram Jakhu, the director of McGill University's Institute of Air and Space Law, and Asgardia's legal expert, believes that Asgardia will be able to fulfil three of the four elements that the UN requires when considering if an entity is a state: citizens; a government; and territory, being an inhabited spacecraft. In that situation, Jakhu considers that fulfilling the fourth element, gaining recognition by the UN member states, will be achievable, and Asgardia will then be able to apply for UN membership. The Security Council would then have to assess the application, as well as obtain approval from two-thirds of the members of the General Assembly.

Joanne Gabrynowicz, an expert in space law and a professor at the Beijing Institute of Technology's School of Law, believes that Asgardia will have trouble attaining recognition as a nation. She says there are a "number of entities on Earth whose status as an independent nation have been a matter of dispute for a long time. It is reasonable to expect that the status an unpopulated object that is not on Earth will be disputed."

Christopher Newman, an expert in space law at the UK's University of Sunderland, highlights that Asgardia is trying to achieve a "complete re-visitation of the current space-law framework," anticipating that the project will face significant obstacles with getting UN recognition and dealing with liability issues. The Outer Space Treaty requires the country that sends a mission into space to be responsible for the mission, including any damage it might cause.

=== Data security ===
As Asgardia is involved in the storing of private data, there could be legal and ethical issues. For the moment, as the Asgardian satellite is being deployed to orbit by US companies, it will fall under US jurisdiction and data stored on the satellite will be subject to US privacy laws. Asgardia itself is based in Vienna, Austria, and therefore operates under Austrian and EU law for the purposes of data protection.

== Economy ==
The ideological component of Asgardia's economy is based on two pillars. The first: In Asgardia, citizens must become owners of the monetary system. The government is simply a middleman, broker and guarantor of monetary transactions. The second: In Asgardia, every citizen must be a participant in the distribution of the Nation's profit.

'Residents' are required to pay a 100 euro or 110 US dollar fee.

=== Legal currency ===
The Head of Nation charged his Administration to hold a contest on the main national Earth currencies in order to determine the initial rate of Solar, the cryptocurrency that will be used for Asgardians. He also charged the Government to introduce a Bill on the National Currency of Asgardia to Parliament.

The second Digital Parliamentary Session (the third Parliamentary session) of Asgardia, which took place on 10–12 January 2019, approved the Act of National Currency and Basic Principles of Economic and Financial System of Asgardia. Parliament voted in favour of tasking the Government with drafting legislation regarding the economic system and the national currency of Asgardia by the next Parliamentary session.

The financial component of Asgardia's economy is based upon its two national currencies. First, the Solar currency. Because the sun shines for all on Earth, the Solar is to become a universal payment currency converted on the exchanges into not just hard currencies that exist in earthly nations, but also into legitimate cryptocurrencies.

Second, the Lunar, which will be an exclusive currency just for the citizens of Asgardia. The Lunar will be an internal financial and monetary asset that confirms the citizenship of Asgardia. As any asset, it is subject to exchanges, sales, loans, gifting, inheritance and more. It is also listed on the exchanges.

In January 2019 Asgardia by voting chose the basket of currencies. Using the results of this voting, the Ministry of Finance and its counterpart, the parliamentary Finance Committee, will analyse and examine how the Solar may be freely exchanged against those currencies in open markets and at what future exchange rates.

The following 12 currencies have been selected: US Dollar; Euro; British Pound; Japanese Yen; Canadian Dollar; Swiss Franc; Hong Kong Dollar; Mexican Peso; Australian Dollar; Singapore Dollar; Norwegian Krone; Swedish Krona.

=== Economic forum ===
On 26–28 October 2018, the First Economic Forum of Asgardia was held in Nice, France. The Forum was attended by representatives from the professional community, including economists, finance professionals, specialists in the areas of development of currency systems, cryptocurrencies and investment tools from Austria, Belgium, Denmark, India, Germany, the Netherlands, Russia, South Africa, Turkey, United States, UK and other countries.

The speakers presented projects of the models of Asgardia's financial system and its economy, monetary system models, and as well issues of creating a balanced financial and economic system of Asgardia. The Memorandum with a general overview and outlines the next steps of developing Asgardia's economic system was adopted on the Forum.

Among other things, it was decided to make Asgardia's presentation of model with two currencies at the World Economic Forum in Davos in January 2019 and for development of draft legislation on the national currencies of Asgardia for introduction to the Parliament of Asgardia.

On 22–25 January 2019, the Asgardian delegation attended the World Economic Forum in Davos, Switzerland. The Asgardian representatives participated at two sessions—economic and cultural at the Caspian Week Conference 2019. The Caspian Week Conference is a meeting of global leaders, visionaries and experts within the Davos Forum. The Conference was held for the third time since the year 2017.
