= Oleg Ozerov =

Soviet veteran of the French Resistance

- Born: Oleg Nikolayevich Ozerov; June 17, 1922; Spassk, Spassky Uyezd, Ryazan Governorate, RSFSR
- Died: January 30, 2007 (aged 84); Moscow, Russia
- Military career
- Allegiance: Soviet Union
- Awards: Ordre national du Mérite; Croix de Guerre; Cross of the Volunteer Combatant of the Resistance; Médaille de la Résistance

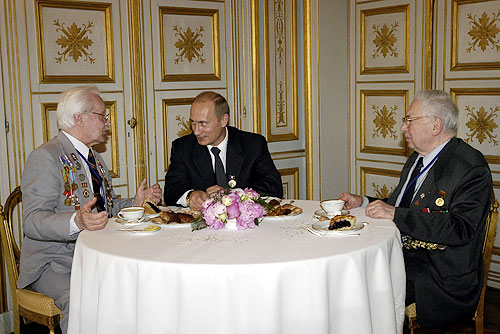
President Vladimir Putin met with Russian veterans of the allied operations in Normandy, Oleg Ozerov and Gleb Plaksin (to the left), Caen, France, 2004

Oleg Nikolayevich Ozerov (Russian: Олег Николаевич Озеров; 17 June 1922 – 30 January 2007) was a Soviet World War II Army soldier, who was a member of the French Resistance during World War II. He was widely decorated for his wartime efforts by both the French and Russian governments.

Ozerov was born in Spassk, Ryazan Governorate. After finishing secondary school in June 1940, he was drafted to serve in the Red Army as a border guard, and was sent to the Soviet Union’s western border where he completed an intensive artillery institute training course. He was stationed near Peremysl when war broke out on June 22, 1941. At the end of July, he suffered shell shock and was taken prisoner. He then went through a number of Nazi concentration camps and work camps, the last of which was located in France near Bordeaux. With the help of French communists, Ozerov escaped and fought with a partisan detachment in Brittany (the Dombrovsky 13th International Brigade). He returned to his homeland at the end of 1945.

After leaving the army, he graduated from the Minsk Polytechnic Institute, worked at a construction firm, Minmontazhspetsstroy, and was involved in building factories and bringing gas to Moscow Oblast. He was manager of a trust, deputy minister, and director of the State Technical Scientific Research Institute.

In 1985, he became a deputy rector of the Moscow Transport Institute, where he taught, and later became the head of the Labour Protection Department.

Ozerov was also the leader of Combatants Volontaires, an interregional association of veterans of the French Resistance. He was decorated with the Ordre national du Mérite, the Croix de Guerre with swords, the Croix de Guerre, the Cross of the Resistance Volunteer Combatant and the Resistance Medal.

In 2004, he was present at the 60th anniversary of the Allied invasion of Normandy, France, which was also attended by Vladimir Putin. He died in January 2007.

== Sources ==
This article incorporates material from the website of the President of Russia and is used under the Creative Commons and Attribution 4.0 International , 8 April 2015 - on Attribution 3.0 Unported Licence.
