= Kirill Seleznyov (businessman) =

Russian businessman (born 1974)

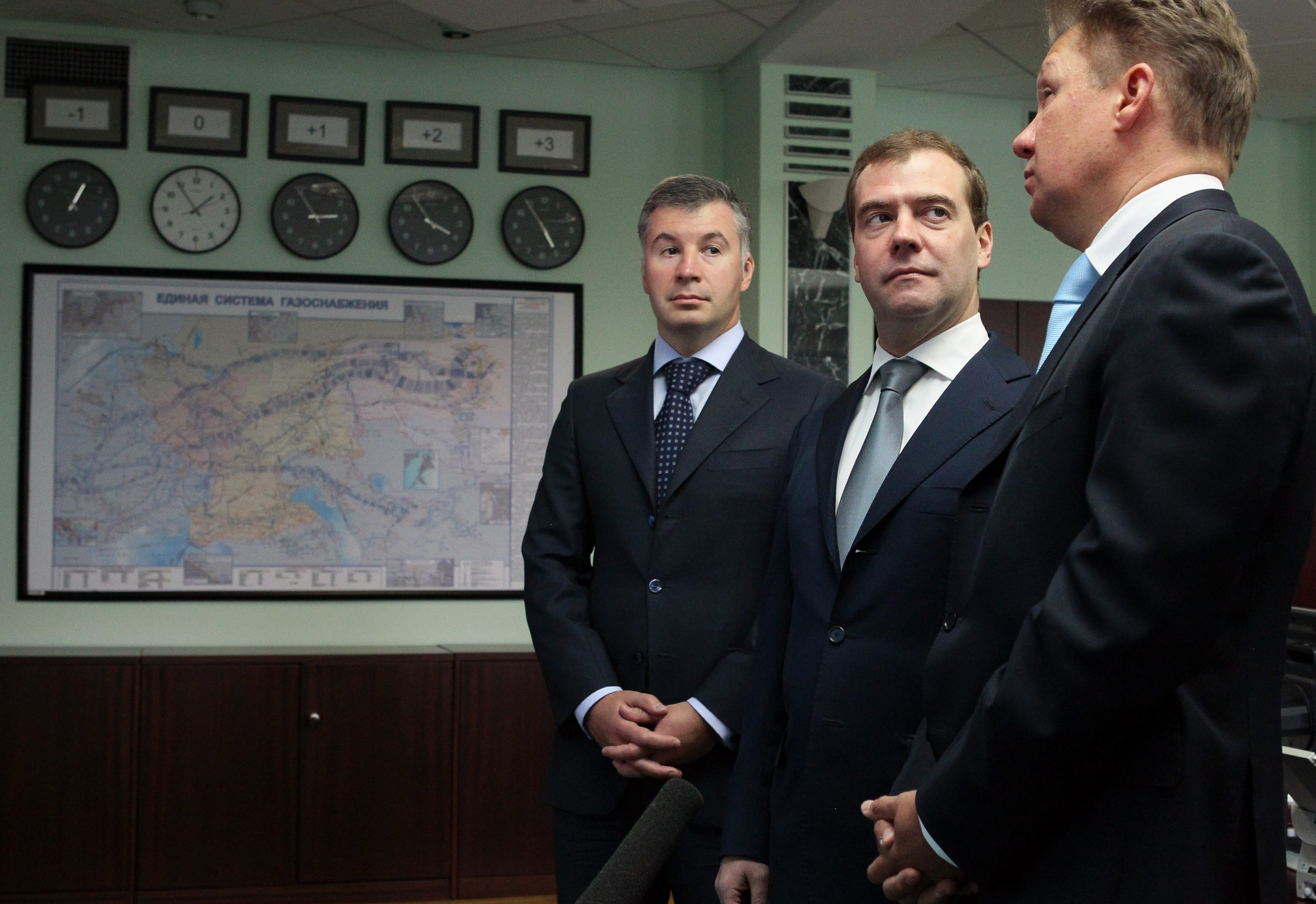
Gazprom Mezhregiongaz General Director Kirill Seleznyov, Russian Prime Minister Dmitry Medvedev and Gazprom CEO Alexey Miller visit Gazprom Mezhregiongaz in Moscow Oblast.

Kirill Gennadiyevich Seleznyov (in Russian: Кирилл Геннадиевич Селезнёв, born 23 April 1974 in Leningrad, Soviet Union) is a Russian businessman.

From 15 April 2002 he was the Head of the Department for Marketing and Processing of Gas and Liquid Hydrocarbons of Gazprom. From 27 September 2002 he was a Member of the Management Committee of Gazprom. From 20 March 2003 he was the Director General of Mezhregiongaz LLC, a subsidiary of Gazprom. Since July 2004 he has been a Member of the Board of Directors of RAO UES. He is also a Member of the Board of Directors of Gazprom Neft.

Seleznyov is also a Romanian citizen. In 2025, the Romanian authorities launched an investigation against Seleznyov for allegedly obtaining the citizenship illegaly.
