= Nikolay Khomyakov =

Russian politician (1850–1925)

Nikolai Khomyakov
- Николай Хомяков
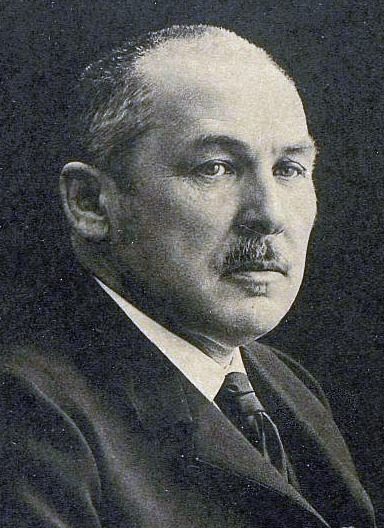

3rd Chairman of the State Duma
- In office 1 November 1907 – 6 March 1910
- Monarch: Nicholas II
- Preceded by: Fyodor Golovin
- Succeeded by: Alexander Guchkov

Personal details
- Born: Nikolay Alekseevich Khomyakov; 19 January 1850 Moscow, Russian Empire
- Died: 28 June 1925 (aged 75) Dubrovnik, Kingdom of Yugoslavia
- Party: Union of October 17

Nikolay Alekseevich Khomyakov (Russian: Николай Алексеевич Хомяков; January 19, 1850 – June 28, 1925) was a Russian politician.

== Life ==
Khomyakov was born in Moscow, the son of Aleksey Khomyakov, a well-known Slavophile and poet. He was a graduate of Moscow University and served in the Ministry of Agriculture.

Khomyakov was active in zemstvo work. He was elected to the Second, Third, and Fourth State Dumas as an Octobrist.

Khomyakov was elected a member of State Council (1906–1907) representing Smolensk Governorate. He was Chairman of the Third Duma (1907–1910) and member of the Progressive Bloc in the Fourth Duma.

During the Russian civil war he was in the Red Cross and worked with Denikin's forces. Khomyakov emigrated to Yugoslavia in 1920 and died in Dubrovnik.

He was awarded Order of Saint Sava.

== See also ==
- V.I. Gurko
