= Fyodor Aleksandrovich Golovin =

Russian politician (1867–1937)

Fyodor Golovin
- Фёдор Головин
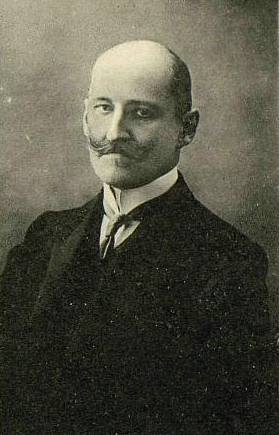
- Golovin in 1910

2nd Chairman of the State Duma
- In office 20 February 1907 – 3 June 1907
- Monarch: Nicholas II
- Preceded by: Sergei Muromtsev
- Succeeded by: Nikolai Khomyakov

Personal details
- Born: Fyodor Alexandrovich Golovin; 21 December 1867 Moscow, Moscow Governorate, Russian Empire
- Died: 10 December 1937 (aged 69) Moscow, Russian SFSR, Soviet Union
- Party: Constitutional Democratic Party
- Education: Imperial Moscow University (1891)
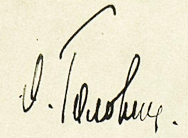
- Signature

Fyodor Alexandrovich Golovin (Russian: Фёдор Алекса́ндрович Голови́н; February 20, 1867 – December 10, 1937) was a Russian politician. He was among the founders of the Constitutional Democratic Party (the "Kadets") and was chairman of the short-lived second convocation of the Imperial Russian Duma, which was in session from February 1907 to June 1907.

Golovin was born in Moscow into a noble family on December 21, 1867. In 1891 he began studying law at Moscow University. Following his law studies, he began political activities. In 1899 he became a member of the group "Conversation"; in 1903 of the Union of Liberation; in 1904 of the Union of Zemstvo-Constitutionalists; and in the autumn of 1905 he was one of the organizers of the Constitutional Democratic Party. He was an active freemason.

Golovin was an energetic participant in party activities, a district leader, and member of the party's central committee. On February 20, 1907, at the first meeting of the Second Duma, he was elected chairman of the Duma by a vote of 356 of 518 members. In the course of its short existence, this Duma tried unsuccessfully to reach agreement of among its various political factions, and in the following Third Duma Golovin was an ordinary member, serving on the Agricultural Committee.

After the February Revolution of 1917, Golovin became Commissioner of all the institutions of the former Ministry of the Imperial Court. After the October Revolution, he served in positions of the new Soviet government. On the decision of the NKVD troika of the Moscow region, Golovin was convicted of the charge of belonging to an anti-Soviet organization, and was shot in Butovo on December 10, 1937, at the age of seventy. He was posthumously rehabilitated in 1989.
