= Anthony the Wanderer =

Russian wanderer (c. 1834 – c. 1911)

- Странник Антоний
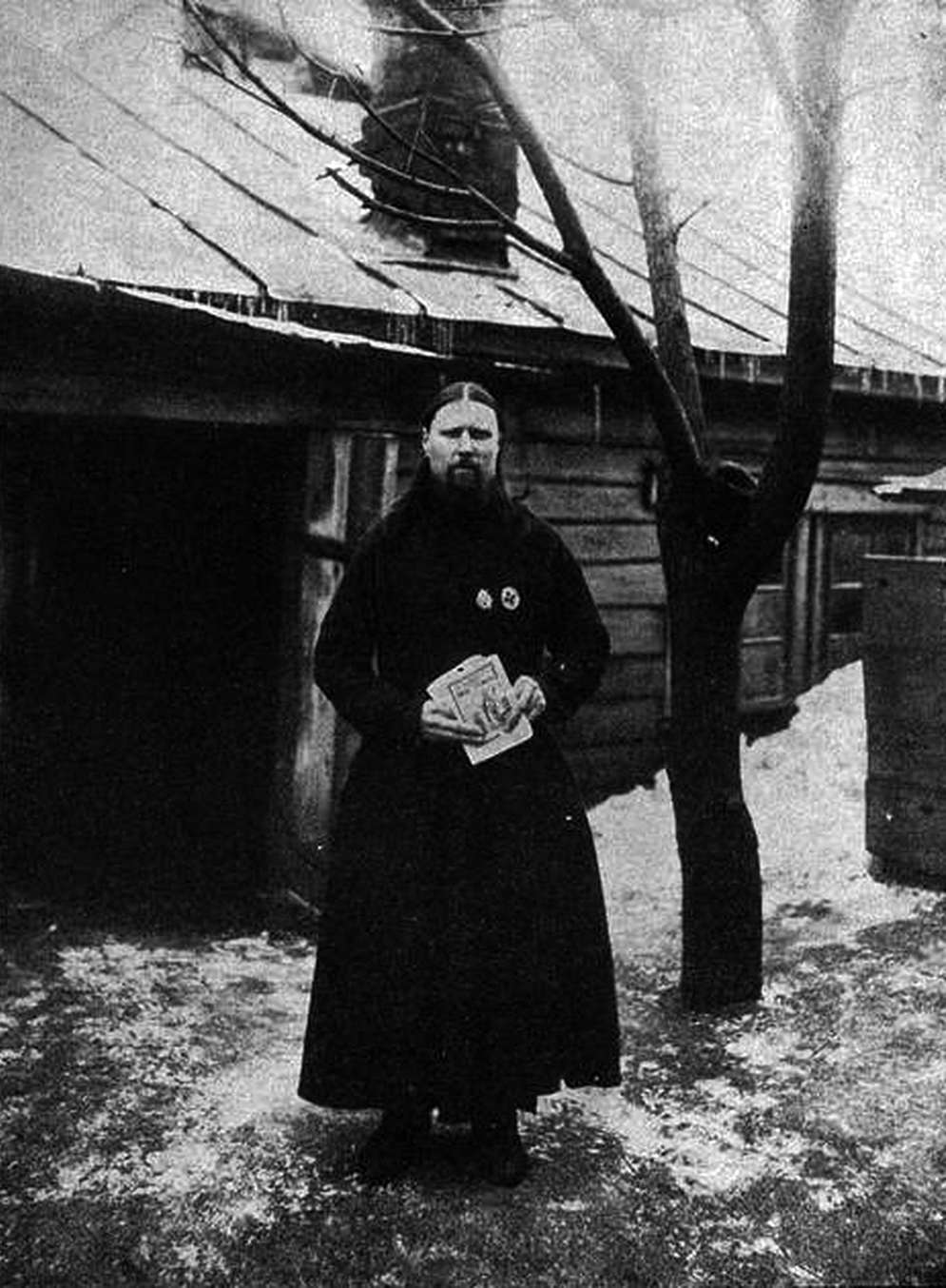
- Anthony as photographed by Karl Bulla, 1911, Russian State Film and Photo Archive
- Born: Anthony (Anton) Isayevich Petrov c. 1834; Kolesnikovo village, Pyatkovo volost, Yalutorovsky Uyezd, Tobolsk Governorate, Russia
- Died: c. 1911; Kolesnikovo village, Pyatkovo volost, Yalutorovsky Uyezd, Tobolsk Governorate, Russia

Anthony the Wanderer (Russian: Странник Антоний; real name Anthony (Anton) Isaevich Petrov; c. 1834 — after 1911) was a Russian wanderer, widely known in Russia during the reigns of Emperors Alexander II, Alexander III and Nicholas II. Some contemporaries, and on the basis of their testimonies, later Soviet and Russian historians attributed to him the influence on the last Russian emperor.

Anthony the Wanderer collected funds for the construction of village churches and schools. However, there were confirmed several cases of entrusted to him money thefts, and fraud in building materials and payment for work; these thefts took place over a long period of time. To humble his body, Anthony wore two poods penance chains (verigi) and a heavy cane. Regardless of the weather or the season, he walked barefoot. Anthony was known as a righteous man, but his contemporaries were also aware of cases of drunkenness involving minors.

Anthony the Wanderer was closely acquainted with a number of prominent government officials, deputies and some representatives of the higher clergy. Candidate of historical sciences Andrei Tereshchuk found close similarities in the personality, appearance, outlook and biography of the Anthony the Wanderer and Grigory Rasputin.

== Biography ==
=== Childhood and youth ===
Anthony Isaevich Petrov was born around 1834 in the village of Kolesnikovo, Yalutorovsky uyezd, Tobolsk province. It is known that he had one brother — Rodion Isaevich Petrov. The doctor of history, the expert in the religion history and relations between state and religion Sergey Firsov gave contradictory information about Petrov's social origin. On the one hand, he called him a merchant. On the other hand, he considered him a citizen. Anton was as a private in the Caucasus. After demobilization, he followed in his father's footsteps, and became a merchant. For a long time, like his father, he traded in Moscow in crafts and imported goods". It was also around this time when he got married. In that marriage he had two sons.

Candidates of historical sciences Andrei Tereshchuk and Sergei Firsov wrote that in his childhood years, having barely learned to read, Anthony preferred religious literature, especially hagiographies of saints. Already in his youth he devoted himself to God, to give up his fortune, to leave his family and to wander in holy places. Sergei Firsov and Andrey Tereshchuk noted that his conversion did not happen in his youth, but in his mature years, and the reason for it was the healing of a serious illness. Anthony vowed that if he recovered, he would dedicate his life to God. He gave up his former life and set out on a journey, giving his clothes and boots to the first beggar he met and taking on two pounds of weight. Regardless of the season, he went barefoot on his wanderings.

Elena Ermachkova, a candidate of history, provides other information about the childhood and youth of the wanderer. It is based on the documentary essay dedicated to the wanderer by the Russian writer Vladimir Korolenko. According to her data, also based on archival materials, Anthony was born not in 1834, but in 1850 in the family of a peasant from the village of Kolesnikovo Isaiah Petrov. The family was poor, sometimes starving. In addition to farming in the household was a carriage trade. Anthony was engaged in it in his youth. According to the memories of the villagers, he was cheerful, liked to go out, so he tried to free himself from the control of his father. Contemporaries claimed that the young man was always drunk on trips outside the village. Anthony began to steal. He established close communication "with settlers and gypsies". Finally, the thief was caught stealing. The judge sentenced the young man to 20 lashes. By the decision of the community, Anthony was exiled to the Siberian taiga, but he suddenly disappeared. A few years later the parish received a request "whether the village community has any objections to the transfer of the peasant Anton Isaevich Petrov to the citizens of Biysk". The villagers did not report about the past of a fellow villager and let him go "in peace".

=== Wanderering ===
After a while, Anthony returned to the village. In the spring of 1895 he was already "a good-looking and quiet wanderer Anthony". He arrived in a "200-ruble carriage" drawn by a trio of horses he owned. The girl sitting next to him was introduced as the nun Sister Anna. Candidate of historical sciences Andrei Tereshchuk and Doctor of historical sciences Sergei Firsov claimed that she was the daughter of a millionaire, but found the meaning of life in the service of a wanderer. Later it turned out that it was a resident of the Perm province Anna Efimovna Koshkina, who was not a nun and put on the cowl at the request of Petrov Firsov wrote that up to twenty women lived with Anthony, who, in his words, "found no satisfaction in their surroundings".

Anthony announced his desire to build a new church in the village. He asked the parishioners, who were at least 15 years old, to deliver to the construction 10 carts of sand, five thousand finished bricks, and three carts of firewood to burn the missing bricks. Each parishioner had to work for three days on the church site. Anthony promised to build a new school next to the church. According to the 1897 census, 714 men and 789 women lived in the village of Kolesnikovo. Before the three-story wooden two-classroom school was completed, the traveler offered to start classes in his own new two-story house. He kept his word. On March 20, 1898 the observer of the Tobolsk diocesan school board wrote in his report: "The premises of this school, built at the expense of the Tobolsk citizen Anton Isaevich Petrov, who calls himself the wanderer Anthony, were given a more dignified form this year by the efforts of the headmaster, Father Alexander Sedachev: the teacher's apartment was moved to the lower floor, and the upper floor, except for the dressing room, was turned into a classroom".

The construction of the church with a bell tower began in April 1896. It is known that Anthony was involved in construction fraud: he received money from the patrons of the capital for every cart and day of work of the peasants who worked for free. One day the neighbors heard a noise in his house and saw that he was "beating his sister Anna like an animal". For a whole week Anthony was drunk, and the contractor Makarov for some fault "scolded and grabbed a handful of cement, threw it in his eyes," beat the bricklayer Korotkov, the peasant Nikitin while working on the construction site hit in the chest so that he hit the doorjamb, lost consciousness. Anthony's authority was undermined. The diocesan architect Bogdan Zinke, after inspecting the church under construction, came to the conclusion that it might collapse. One wall had already cracked and separated. As the Siberian media noted, "one shameful autumn night Anthony fled without paying the contractor Makarov 563 rubles and the masons over 600 rubles. However, he returned the following spring, but with little money he once again led a merry and dissolute life".

For seven years, the wanderer Anthony lived in the village of Kolesnikovo during the summer to supervise the construction of a church and school. His behavior was rebellious. He organized drunken parties in the school building, where he lived during the summer, or in his apartment during school hours. He would gather students together and give them wine to drink. In the summer of 1897, the local priest heard that the children were singing the troparion to St. Nicholas of Myra on Anthony's orders, but instead of the saint's name, they were substituting Anthony's name. The next Sunday, the children were not in church for the service. One of the boys explained to the priest that "Father Anthony" had stopped them from going to church. A stranger standing nearby explained, "You don't let them come to me, and I don't let them come to you. In 1904 the Church of the Epiphany was opened in Kolesnikovo. The school was never finished.

In the course of time, in Siberia, Anthony gained a reputation as a swindler. After giving a 64-pound bell to the Bigilinskaya church, he demanded 200 carts from the parishioners, charging 4 rubles each, and from the Goryunovsky parish he demanded 50 carts for books and a 300-rouble bell. Anthony became famous for his strange antics in Tyumen. He invited a photographer, but refused to pay for the pictures, which cost 280 rubles.

=== St. Petersburg and Moscow ===
Anthony first appeared in Moscow in 1860, when he visited the Iverskaya Chapel of the Mother of God. Already in the first half of the 1860s he became widely known in Moscow. It was believed that when alms were given to him, he distributed them immediately. For three years Anthony traveled in the Caucasus and visited Transbaikal. He visited various provinces of the Russian Empire. Anthony's companion during his travels in Siberia and Palestine in the 1890s was a well-known philanthropist among the merchants of Kronshtadt, Vladimir Dmitrievich Nikitin. Nikitin published his impressions of their joint travels in the pages of Kronstadt newspapers. Eventually, Anthony settled in Moscow as a widely known wanderer and philanthropist. Visitors lined up at his house, eager to receive advice from the wanderer or material help.

The writer Vladimir Korolenko, who followed the activities of the wanderer Anthony, wrote that the media created a loud advertisement for him. His arrival was reported in every city on the way to St. Petersburg, where he first traveled in 1894. To the newspaper's surprise, Anthony arrived in the capital not on foot, but by train, and after his arrival, for some unknown reason, he went to the vodka factory of Vasily Petrov. A contemporary described two days of the wanderer's stay in Kronstadt: "On April 3 and 4, a huge crowd stood in front of one of these houses, which did not disperse until late at night. At the gate, at the entrance, stood the master and mistress —a very vigilant guard— who let in only those who left something in a trembling hand. This was during the day. In the evening and at night everyone was admitted for an entrance fee of 30 kopecks per person. The corridor, 10 sazhens long and 2 arshin wide, was crowded with people. Talking, crying of children mingled, the crowd was terrible, the corridors were dark, the crowd went forward very quietly, as the saint released the front lucky ... The corridor was with a turn — and at the end of it, the correspondent who described this scene, saw the newly appeared saint".

In time, the popularity of Anton and the size of his personal fortune reached enormous proportions. In 1894 the political, social and literary newspaper Petersburgsky Listok reported: "The wanderer Anthony has workshops and factories which work only for him bells, iconostases, church utensils. He writes all the icons from the Trinity Lavra". With the money collected by the wanderer, churches and schools were built throughout the country. (Note: Among such churches is the Edinoverie (Unithodox) Christ-Christening Church in the village of Snegiryevskoye (the church is wooden, but on a stone foundation, with a bell tower, single-domed), built in 1896.) In March 1894, a copper bell weighing 550 poods was cast for the donations of 11,000 roubles collected by Anthony for St. Andrew's Cathedral in Kronstadt. His charity was recognized by a diploma of the Holy Governing Synod, signed by Metropolitan Palladius (Raev) of St. Petersburg and Ladoga. General Field Marshal Joseph Gurko, the First Protopresbyter of the Russian Army and Navy Alexander Zhelobovsky, the Commander of Moscow General Alexei Unkovsky expressed their gratitude to Anthony. Andrei Tereshchuk wrote that after Anthony became an object of veneration in Moscow, St. Petersburg and other regions of Russia, he no longer went on foot and preferred to take a carriage.

The monogramist O. B. A. in the monthly socio-political, literary and scientific journal Russkoye Bogatstvo characterized the wanderer Anthony as "once a happy rival of John of Kronstadt". However, the author of the article concluded that the wanderer's departure from the capital to Siberia was due to his defeat in the rivalry with John. He mentioned some articles written by Anthony, in which "the tyranny and trash of the almost prehistoric times use all the power of the printing press and all the comforts of state patronage". These articles are distributed, according to O. B. A.'s conviction, by the Kiev-Pechersk and Pochaev Lavras. The author writes about the extreme conservatism of the wanderer's views and compares them with the views of one of the ardent Black Hundreds, Hieromonk Iliodor. On the contrary, the anonymous author of an article in the magazine Strannik for 1894 argues that Anthony did not address people with any kind of teaching or preaching. People saw in his actions deeds, holiness, sought to receive from him a prophecy, a favor, and the wanderer himself was perceived as a "man of God".

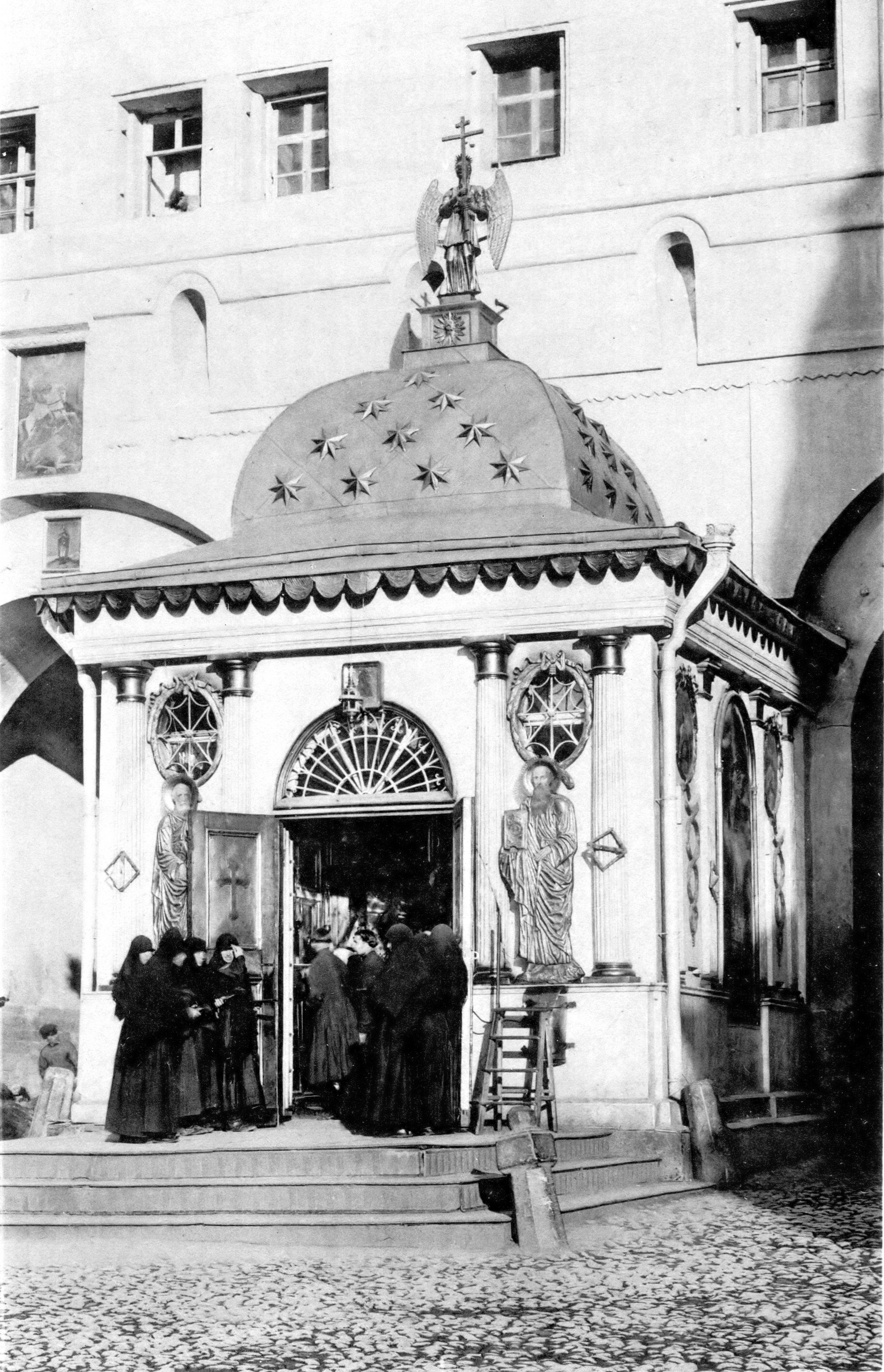
Iverskaya Chapel in Moscow, before 1915

=== Last years of life ===
Vladimir Korolenko wrote that from 1894 the fame of the wanderer began to decline rapidly, and by the beginning of the 20th century Anthony had lost his popularity among the general public. However, the ideals and image of the wanderer continued to be important to ordinary people. One of the Kronstadt newspapers wrote: "Instead of the absent wanderer Anthony, we have a new one, with a whole train of sanctimonious godmothers and worshippers. He walks barefoot, in a green silk robe..."

According to the testimony of the neighbors, the wanderer Anthony died around 1910. One of the residents remembered that in 1907 he baptized her mother and gave her an icon. After that there is no trace of him in Kolesnikov. A photograph of Anthony taken by the famous St. Petersburg photographer Karl Bulla has been preserved. It is dated 1911. In the cemetery of the village of Kolesnikovo there is a red brick grave of the wayfarer. On the grave there is a gray stone without an inscription. However, the great-nephew of Anthony, the candidate of medicine, the surgeon Sergey Zyryanov in his memoirs wrote that the grave of the wanderer was actually destroyed during the Soviet rule, but "his compatriots still remember him as a saint and a Christian", so after 100 years they restored the place of his rest.

== Assessment ==
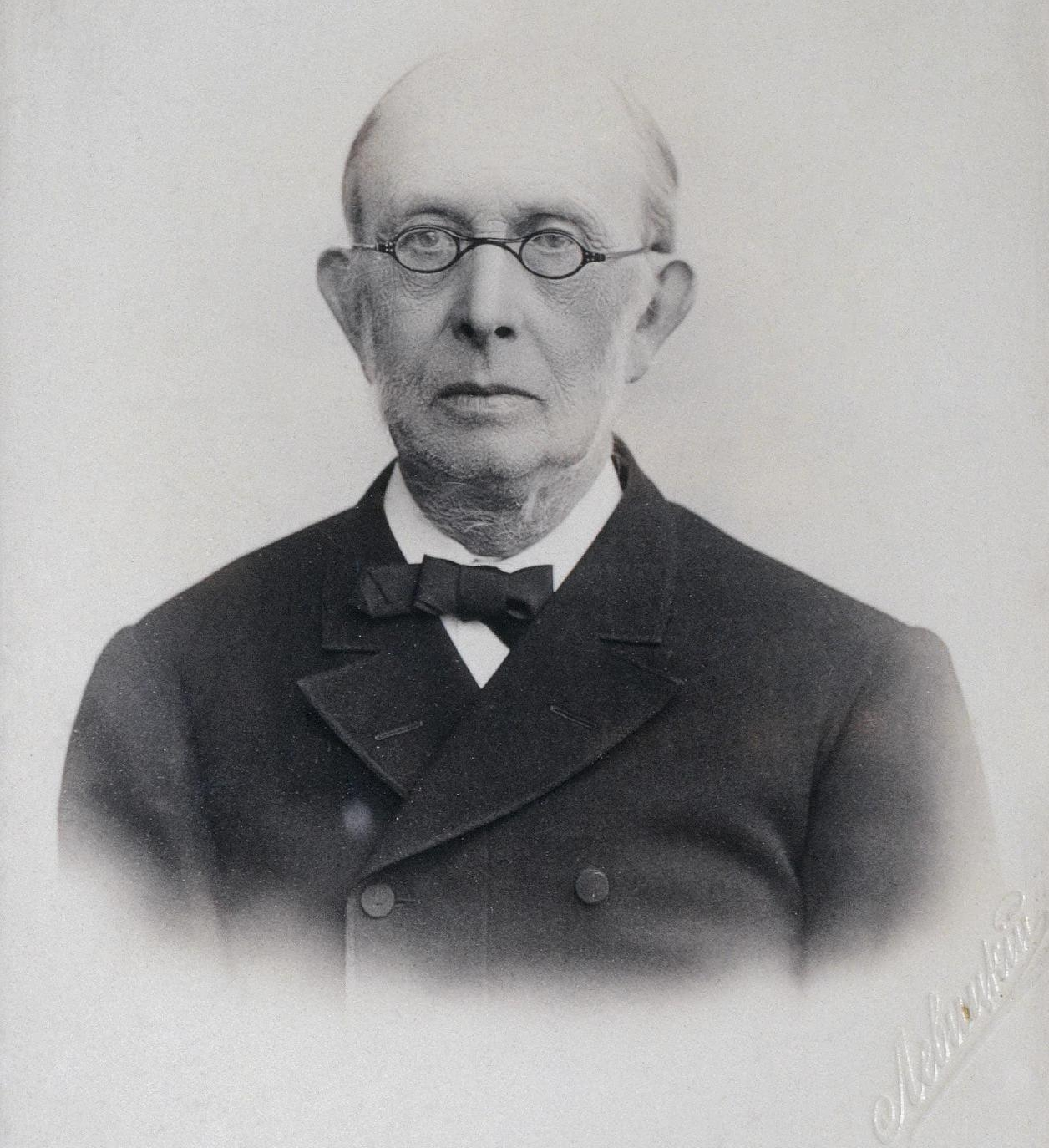
Konstantin Pobedonostsev in 1902

Apollinarius Lvov, the director of the Archives and Library of the Holy Synod, made an entry in his diary on April 14, 1894:

Everyone in the city is talking and writing in the newspapers about Anthony the Wanderer who came to St. Petersburg barefoot and in chains. This has given him an aura of holiness. People come to him by the thousands, bringing all kinds of offerings, large and small. Such ugly phenomena from the point of view of true Orthodoxy and morality are now being repeated more and more often and are simply a sign of the times. No police or censorship measures are taken against such ugly manifestations of all kinds of prudes and philanderers and the writing about them. We can expect that they will soon be elevated to the rank of "synodal wanderers", as there are now synodal missionaries. It is an amazing time. We are still treading the ground or turning back, and we want to assure ourselves and others that we are working and moving forward.

An extremely negative opinion on Anthony was given by the chief procurator of the Holy Synod, Konstantin Pobedonostsev, in a letter to the head of the main press department of the Ministry of Internal Affairs, Evgeny Feoktistov, dated March 21, 1894. For Pobedonostsev, the wanderer is a "clever scoundrel". He notes that the police act "in concert with him," although, in the opinion of the chief prosecutor, Anton deserves "expulsion" (from the capital). Pobedonostsev suggests that the wanderer paid a number of publications to stir up excitement around him. Among such newspapers he called in Moscow Russky listok, which in each issue prints stories about his "prayers, benefits, healings, etc." According to Pobedonostsev, these articles are written by a certain Jew Strusberg under the pseudonym [A.] Pavlov. In the capital "Petersburg leaflet", from the point of view of the chief prosecutor, prints information about the wanderer even more "shamelessly".

Pobedonostsev told his addressee that he had seen two manuscripts submitted for approval for printing: one — Anthony the Wanderer by Sokolovich, and the other — Anthony the Wanderer, Tomsk citizen Anton Petrov. He walks barefoot and carries weights, which is a collection of articles about the wanderer from the Petersburgsky List. The Procurator was afraid that the censors would allow these publications to be printed. Pobedonostsev asked Feoktistov to take all necessary measures "not to pass and send to the spiritual censorship".

In the first edition of the book of the Russian socio-political figure, deputy of the State Duma of the Russian Empire of the first convocation from Kaluga Governorate and one of the leaders of the Constitutional Democratic Party Viktor Obninsky The Last Autocrat: Materials for the Nicholas II characterization, published in 1912 in Berlin, there was a large reproduction of the photo, under which there was a signature: "Anthony the Wanderer, a favorite of the Black Hundreds. During the first Duma he was summoned to the Tsar to give wise advice". On April 14, 1894, Sankt-Petersburgskie Vedomosti openly accused the wanderer of "hypocrisy and religious charlatanism. The newspaper Novoe Vremya also criticized the wanderer.

In Soviet times, Anthony was commonly referred to as one of the "numerous domestic and imported miracle workers, seers, fortune tellers, and clichés", which included the occultist Papius, the praying mantis Daria Osipova, the wanderer Vasily Barefoot, the soothsayer Grippa, the fools as Pasha Sarovskaya and Mitya Kozelsky. It was believed that they "performed the function of the most trusted persons and advisors of Nicholas II and Alexandra Feodorovna" in the period after the expulsion of the Frenchman Philip and before the appearance at the court of Grigory Rasputin. Doctor of Philosophy Alexander Grigorenko, citing the testimony of Sergei Trufanov, claimed that the tsar had a rule: "First he listens to the 'elders' and 'blessed', and then to the ministers".

For the first time in modern Russia, the attention of historical studies to the figure of the wanderer was drawn by Doctor of History Sergei Firsov in the process of publishing the diary of Apollinarius Lvov. (Note: Many decades before that, a small fragment of his book People of Joy. Life descriptions of ascetics of piety of the early 20th century dedicated in the 1960s to the wanderer Anthony Metropolitan of Kuibyshev and Syzran and church historian Manuel (Lemeshevsky).) Andrei Tereshchuk found surprising similarities in the personality, appearance, outlook, and biography of the traveler Anthony and Grigory Rasputin.

== Appearance and personality ==
A correspondent of the Tobolsk newspaper described the appearance and lifestyle of the wanderer (the events described took place on September 17, 1895 in the village of Pyatkovsky): "Anthony walked ahead of the crowd, wearing chains and carrying a half-pound stick. After the meeting he went to the priest's house, where he ate a modest meal and drank a few swigs of church wine to strengthen his health. Then he began to recount the difficulties he had encountered on his journey to the holy places. He accompanied his story with an exhibition of photographs, a large number of which he had in his possession. They showed him praying at the Jordan River with an olive branch or kneeling on the stony ground of Lebanon. Letters to him from the Patriarch of Jerusalem, many Russian bishops, Fr. John of Kronstadt were also shown and read. Elena Ermachkova, a candidate of historical sciences, reported that some of the pictures mentioned in the description have reached the present and are with V.A. Tikhonova, the keeper of the Kolesnikov Museum. Only the photos of the Patriarchs of Jerusalem and Palestine Gerasimus and Nicodemus have characteristic typographic impressions. According to them, the photos were taken in 1888 and 1891.

Volzhsky Vestnik May 3, 1894 gives the following description of the wanderer:

He walks barefoot, wear a long black robe, under which he wears iron belts and chains, which are locked on his chest with a brass lock. In his hands he carries a large club, the head of which is lined with lead and has the image of a cross... He always carries with him several copies of newspapers in which his deeds are described, several telegrams, allegedly from Fr. John of Kronstadt, and the reality of fiqh. He always carries with him several copies of newspapers describing his deeds, several telegrams, supposedly from Fr. John of Kronstadt, but in reality fictitious, and several photographic cards on which this traveler is photographed in various heroic poses... He himself is a healthy man, 42 years old, stupid, and pretends to be so especially when he is asked what right he has to give blessings to the laity.

St. John of Kronstadt had to address the people of St. Petersburg through the media about his relationship with Anthony: "I visited the wanderer Anthony only once, because I go to all those who call me for prayer, but his life is unknown to me. I have never asked him or anyone else to collect or deliver donations on my behalf. In the future, I ask you not to associate my name with the activities of the wanderer Anthony, who is completely unknown to me, and not to include in your articles any of my conversations about him, which are transmitted inaccurately and can mislead those who read them”.

The local historian Fyodor Kurakin described the arrival of Anthony from Kronstadt to consecrate the site for the construction of a church in the village of Starye Gorki in present-day Zubtsovsky District of the Tver region in 1894. The traveler, according to his words, looked to be about 45 years old, he had red-brown close-cropped hair. In his hands he carried an icon of St. Sergius of Radonezh during the procession.

The Russian writer and publicist Mikhail Shevlyakov described his encounter with Anthony in 1895 during his own pilgrimage to the Holy Trinity-Saint Sergius Lavra. He saw him on the street surrounded by two or three hundred admirers. Talking to one of them, he learned that the wanderer was ascribed the ability to "see with the spirit," the "gift of clairvoyance," the capacity for "revelation," and "righteousness." Shevlyakov was surprised that his admirers considered him a fool. He himself admitted that he saw no signs of foolishness in Anthony. Another gift of the wanderer was the ability to cure constipation. Anthony's admirers told the writer that every day in his apartment he reads Akathistas and conducts a service. Shevlyakov noticed that the wanderer is very talkative, and his speech is characterized by persuasiveness. From the writer's point of view, the "prophetic gift" of the wayfarer is connected with the fact that he tries to dispel the doubts of his interlocutor with moralizing, and the interlocutor unconsciously distorts the facts under the influence of the mystical mood formed in the process of communication with Anthony. According to the writer, the wanderer is especially popular among merchants and bourgeois.

Anthony claimed that the allegations about his dissolute lifestyle were defamatory and were made to tempt him. In an interview with a St. Petersburg newspaper, he said: "Temptation! Isn't it too much temptation? Do I not go back to the woods, where it is so quiet, calm, without sorrow and sighing? - No... If they persecute you, go, says the Scripture; but if they only tempt you, endure. Lord, how soon will they persecute me?"

== In fiction ==
In the novel about the Russian revolutionary Marxist German Lopatin by the Soviet writer Yuri Davydov, The Straw-Roofed Hut, or Two Bundles of Letters (1982-1986), in a conversation between two characters, Orlov and Tikhomirov, there is talk about the bright representatives of Russian society of the late 19th century. One of them is the wanderer Anthony: "A Siberian, a merchant, he was a hundred thousandaire, he had a family — no, he gave up everything, he made a vow, he has been wandering for thirty years. Everyone comes to him, takes his hand and kisses it. I asked the men and women, not without slyness: what was his interest, the wanderer Anthony? They said: "But that he can read your life like a book and give you advice; that he, you know, gets a lot of donations for a year, but he, you know, gives every penny to churches and orphanages; he is a miracle worker, a miracle worker... He walks barefoot, with two-pound weights on his back and chest, a shabby cassock, calico, and the wind ruffles his curls, a biblical old man. He begins to sing Akathists to St. Sergius, his voice is not loud but impressive, everyone sings along".

Davydov describes the appearance of the wanderer: "his face is a baked apple, his beard is scrubbed, his hair is unkempt and bushy, his cassock is patchy, his boots are begging for porridge". Anthony believes he has true happiness because he has renounced worldly vanity and wealth. He explains his passion for wanderlust — he was once a novice in Kiev, but could not settle in: "If you stay in one place, your feet yearn. If you are not on the move, you can never drown your passions".

== Bibliography ==
=== Sources ===
- Внутреннее церковное обозрение [Internal Church Review] (in Russian). Vol. 2. Странник: Духовный журнал. 1894. pp. 552–561.
- Ziryanov, S. Ya. (2019). Почему-то мне это рассказали… [For some reason I was told this...] (in Russian). Тюменские известия: Газета.
- Kurakin, F. A. (2013). Погост Елисаветино Зубцовского уезда Тверской губернии // Восемнадцатый век [Elisavetino Zubtsovsky uyezd pogost, Tver province // Eighteenth century // Eighteenth century] (in Russian). Vol. 2. М.: Рипол Классик. pp. 375–380. ISBN 978-5-4241-1009-2.
- Lvov, A. N. (2000). «Быть может и в моём песке и соре найдется какая-нибудь крупица…» (Дневник Аполлинария Николаевича Львова. Подготовка текста, вводная статья и комментарии С. Л. Фирсова) [“Maybe in my sand and sod there will be some grit...” (Diary of Apollinariy Nikolaevich Lvov. Preparation of the text, introductory article and comments by S. L. Firsov)] (in Russian). Нестор: Ежевартальный журнал истории и культуры России и Восточной Европы. pp. 9–164. ISSN 1726-7870.
- O. B. A. (1907). Случайные заметки: Князь Мещерский — прогрессист [Random note: Prince Meshchersky is a progressive] (in Russian). Русское богатство: Журнал. pp. 162–165.
- Obninsky, V. P. (1912). Странник Антоний // Последний самодержец: материалы для характеристики Николая II [Wanderer Anthony // The Last Autocrat: Materials for the Characterization of Nicholas II] (in Russian). Berlin: Eberhard Frowein Verlag (ger). p. 132.
- Pobedonostsev, K. P. (1936). Письмо № 65 к Е. М. Феоктистову от 21 марта 1894 года // Литературное наследство. Непериодическое научное издание, орган Отделения языка и литературы АН СССР [Letter No. 65 to E. M. Feoktistov of March 21, 1894] (in Russian). Vol. 22–24. М.: Журнально-газетное объединение, Правда. pp. 551–552.
- Shevlyakov, M. V. (1895). Среди пилигримов (Путевые впечатления во время Троицкого похода). X. Странник Антоний // Исторический вестник: Историко-литературный журнал [Among the Pilgrims (Travel impressions during the Trinity campaign). X. Wanderer Antony] (in Russian). Vol. 62. СПб.: Типография А. С. Суворина. pp. 149–163.

=== Researches and non-fiction ===
- Grigorenko, A. Yu. (1991). Колдовство и колдуны на Руси // Сатана там правит бал. Критические очерки магии [Witchcraft and sorcerers in Russia] (in Russian). Киев: Украина. pp. 116–140. ISBN 5-319-00427-3.
- Мануил (Лемешевский). Странник Антоний // Люди радования. Жизнеописания подвижников благочестия начала XX века [Manuel (Lemeshevsky). Wanderer Anthony // People of Joy. Life descriptions of the ascetics of piety of the beginning of the XX century] (in Russian). СПб.: Царское дело. 2019. p. 784. ISBN 978-5-9110-2051-4.
- Melnikova, А. (2019). Великий гражданин Кронштадта [A great citizen of Kronstadt] (in Russian). Кронштадтский вестник: Газета.
- Morozov, E. Yu. (2018). Единоверческая Христорождественская церковь в селе Снегирёвское Тобольской губернии [United Christian Nativity Church in the village of Snegiryevskoye, Tobolsk Province] (in Russian). Армизонский вестник: Газета.
- Panin, А. N. (2014). Странник Василий Босоногий [Wanderer Vasily the Barefoot] (in Russian). Нижний Новгород: Издательский отдел Нижегородской епархии. p. 208. ISBN 978-5-9036-5756-8.
- Tereschuk, А. V. (2006). "3. "The Man of God"". Григорий Распутин. Последний «старец» империи [Grigory Rasputin. The last “elder” of the empire] (in Russian). СПб.: Вита Нова. pp. 111–168. ISBN 5-9389-8103-4.
- Firsov, S. L. (2003). Антоний // Святой Иоанн Кронштадтский в воспоминаниях современников [Anthony // St. John of Kronstadt in the memoirs of contemporaries] (in Russian). СПб, М.: Издательский дом «Нева», Олма медиа групп. pp. 210–211. ISBN 5-9484-6283-8.

=== Fiction and publishing ===
- Davydov, Yu. V. (2004). Соломенная сторожка, или Две связки писем [The Straw Lodge, or Two Bundles of Letters] (in Russian). Vol. 4. М.: ЗАО «Пропаганда». p. 560. ISBN 978-5-9487-1021-1.
- Korolenko, V. G. (1914). Cовременная самозванщина. Очерк первый: Самозванцы духовного прозвания [Modern imposture. Essay One: The Impostors of Spiritual Appellation] (in Russian). Vol. 3. Петроград: Издание товарищества А. Ф. Маркса. pp. 273–314.
