= Dziady (disambiguation) =

Dziady (Polish for 'grandfathers' / 'eldfathers'), sometimes translated as Forefathers' Eve, is a term in Slavic folklore for the spirits of the ancestors and a collection of the associated pre-Christian rites.

Dziady may also refer to:

- Dziady (poem)
- Dziady (wandering beggars)
- Dziady śmigustne, local Polish Easter tradition
- Dziady żywieckie or jukace, local Polish New Year's Eve tradition
