= Russian wandering =

Russian Orthodox Christian religious tradition

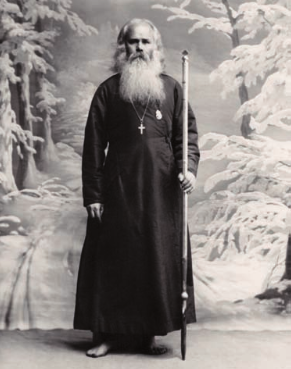
A prominent strannik, Vasily the Barefoot

In the history of Russian Orthodox religion the tradition of wandering (Russian: странничество, strannichestvo) was a special way of life, a form of piety, devotion, and the search of God, which consisted in rejecting the earthly ways of life. A person was called странник, strannik, literally "wanderer". A major work to come out of this tradition is called The Way of a Pilgrim.

By the 19th century, wandering driven by religious devotion had turned into a mass movement. Notable wanderers include Anthony the Wanderer, Vasily the Barefoot, and Paraskeva Diveyevskaya. For a similar phenomenon, though not religiously motivated, to the west of Russia, see Dziady.

== Terminology ==
Strannichestvo is similar to the concept of Christian pilgrimage and is often translated into English with this term. However, in the Russian language "pilgrimage" is denoted by a different word, (Russian: паломничество (palomnichestvo). The major distinction is that pilgrimage has a finite goal: a visit of some holy place, while strannichectvo is the wandering way of life.

Strannichestvo is distinguished from aimless wandering or wandering of the poor (vagrancy). For the purpose of this distinction, the terms "spiritual wandering" and "holy wanderer" are used.

== History ==
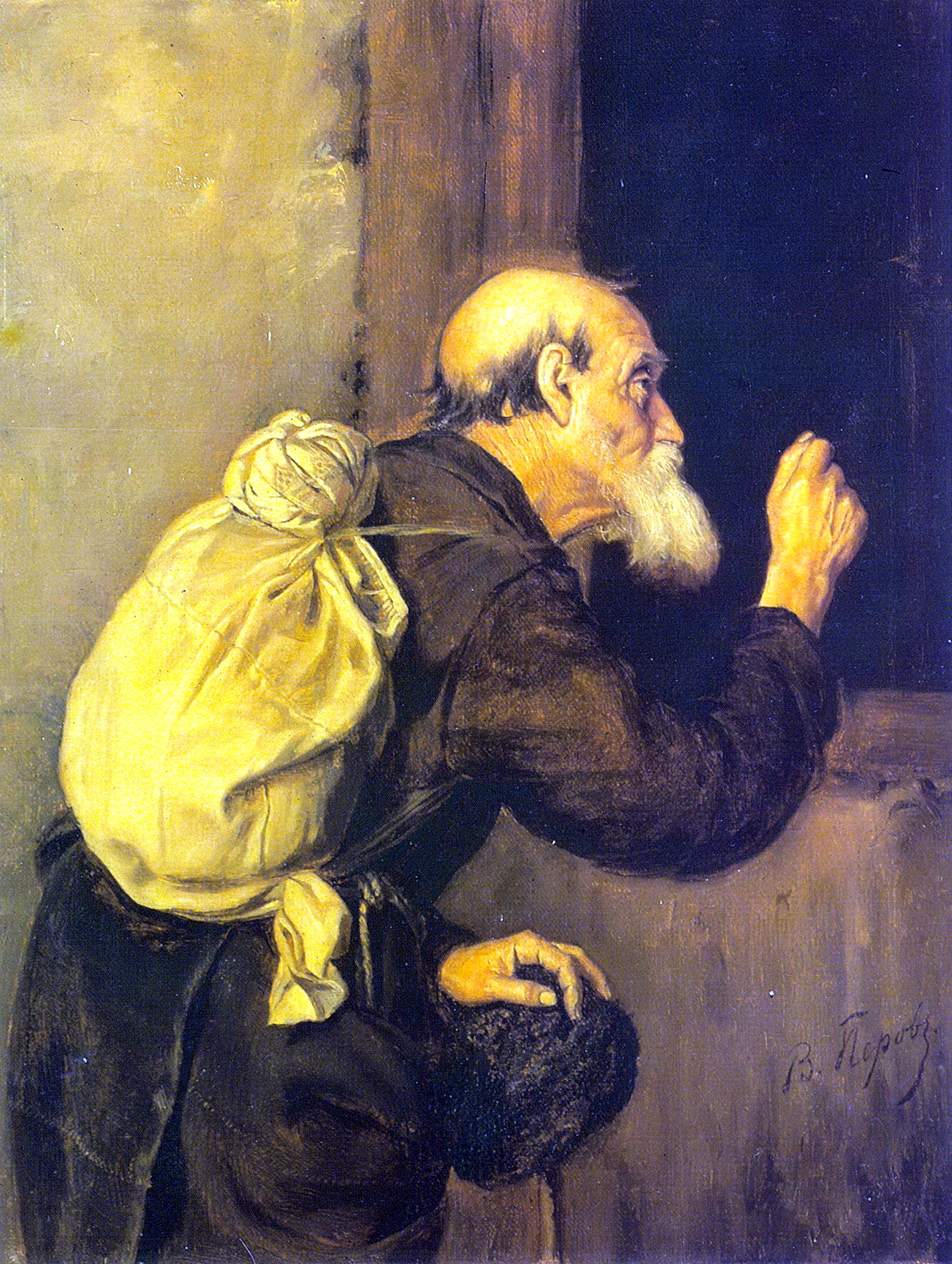
Strannik, by Vasily Perov, 1869

Strannichestvo evolved from the Christian tradition of pilgrimage. Some pilgrims carried out pilgrimage to several places, spending a considerable part of their life doing so. Over time, it has evolved into a particular kind of spiritual feat, which could include pilgrimage. Stranniks were welcomed by Russian common folk. In return for hospitality, strangers described the holy (and other) places they visited, peddled holy relics and texts.

Unlike European mendicant orders, Russian stranniks were ordinary people, rather than monks. A major source of information about the wanderers is Sergey V. Maksimov's compendium The Wandering Russia of the Christ’s Sake Beggars (first published in 1877). Maksimov noted that, during the 1860s, more than 170,000 pilgrims visited the Kiev Monastery of the Caves annually, though he also remarked that this number was beginning to decrease.

Superficially, a Russian strannik and a vagrant looked alike in their way of life. The main difference is that, for a strannik, peregrination is a spiritual value, while for a vagrant or a travelling beggar it is an inevitable hapless state due to overwhelming circumstances.

There existed many types of wanderers, each with their own purpose. Some set out merely to visit a few sacred sites before returning home, while others continued their journeys until exhaustion stopped them. Certain wanderers had taken a voluntary vow to devote several years of their lives to the service of God. Others undertook pilgrimages as an act of repentance. Some traveled from place to place begging in order to raise money for religious causes (such as the construction of a church), often doing so with the bishop’s approval or under commission from their religious community.

According to Pål Kolstø, "these wayfarers were actively opposed by the authorities, state as well as ecclesiastical: wanderers were seen as an untidy, undesirable and disturbing element who, with their restless behavior and freedom from worldly cares and responsibilities, called in question the existing structures of society."

== Wanderers sect ==
In the last quarter of the 18th century, a priestless Old Believers tolk (denomination) emerged, who declared that the only way of salvation from the Antichrist was the clandestine, fugitive way of life. The reason for that was the belief that Peter the Great with his reform of the Russian church was the Antichrist and all state institutions are those of the Antichrist. This denomination was called stranniki ("wanderers") or beguny ("runaways").

== Wandering in fiction ==
- The Wanderer, a 1867 poem by Apollon Maykov
- Who Can Be Happy and Free in Russia?, a long poem by Nikolai Nekrasov
- The Enchanted Wanderer, a 1873 novel by Nikolai Leskov
- Wanderers are often featured in Alexander Ostrovsky's plays and in Rilke's The Book of Pilgrimage.

== See also ==
- Yurodivy
- The Way of a Pilgrim
- Dziady (wandering beggars)
- Kalika
