= Dziady (wandering beggars) =

Category of wanderers in Poland

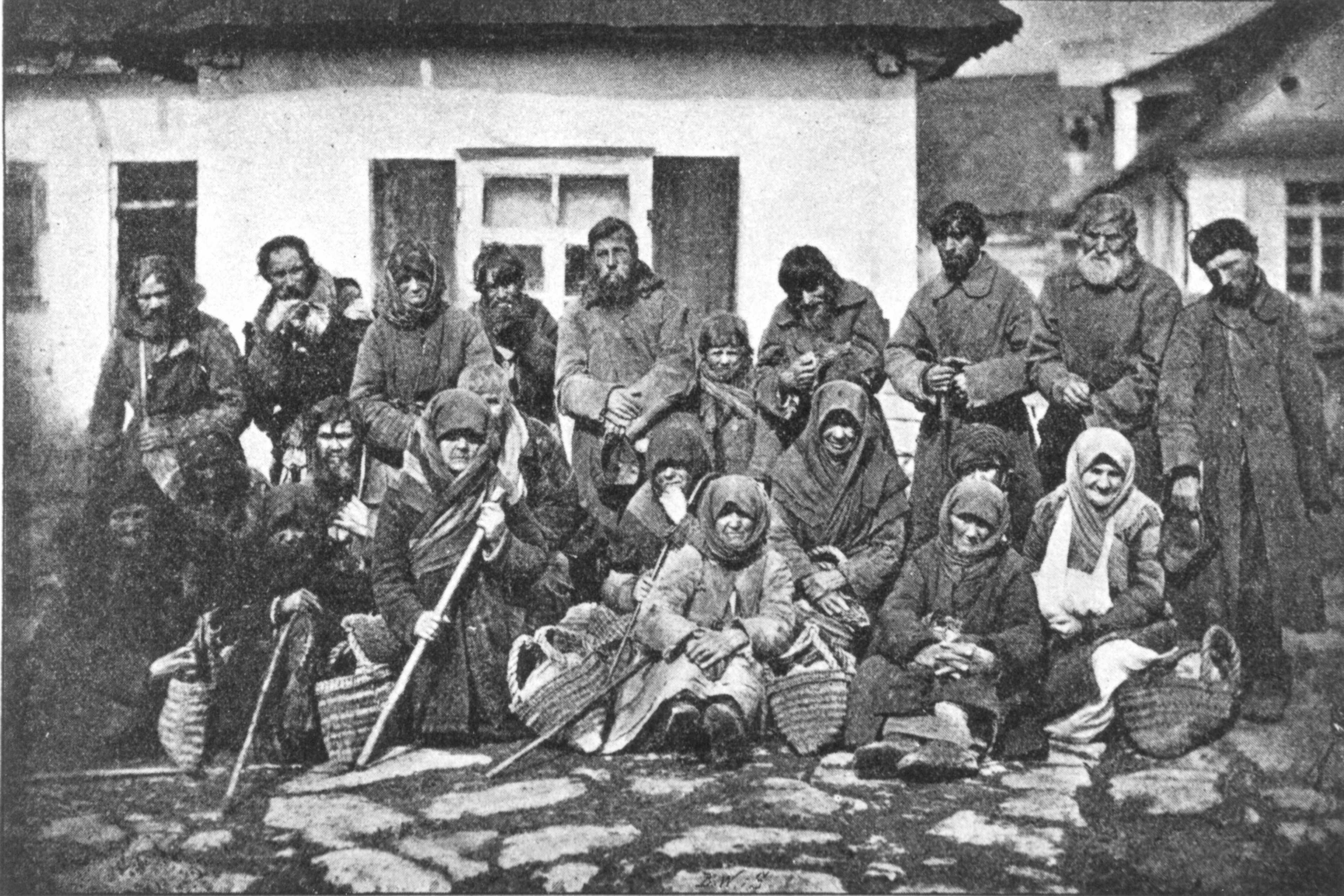
A late 19th-century image of Dziady-beggars near Kamieniec Podolski, Podolia Governorate, by Michał Greim.

Dziady (plural, lit. old men, beggars; singular: dziad), also dziady proszalne (begging dziady) or dziad kalwaryjski (calvarian dziad) (Note: The term 'calvarian dziad' refers to the fact that they used to beg for alms by churches (hence a synonym dziad kościelny) and monasteries, and many of them made pilgrimage to one of Catholic calvarian sanctuaries in Poland. The term produced the verb dziadować (to dziad), nouns dziadowanie (dziading), dziadostwo (the state of being a dziad or a bunch of dziads), etc.) was a term commonly used in many regions of Poland (as well as in other Slavic countries) to refer to wandering beggars. Calling beggars dziady was associated with the idea that they have mediumship skills, are a kind of link with the otherworld and representatives of the dead (dziady-ancestors). In Russia, the term kaliki was used instead (see Russian wandering).

== The activity of dziady ==
In traditional itinerant rural communities, dziady performed important social functions. They were not perceived and treated as 'ordinary' beggars but as intermediaries between the world of the living and the dead. Thanks to them, it was possible to establish contact with the ancestors and fulfill the duties imposed on them by tradition (e.g. feed them). It was also believed that the prayer of dziady had a special power, therefore, especially during the periods of All Souls' Day, they were asked to remember the souls of their ancestors, rewarded with food or financial donations. In some areas, dziady also played an important role in funerary rituals – they were hired to 'guard' the corpse of the deceased or invited to a special kind of wake (the so-called dziad's dinner).

Dziady were also very often singers. They performed various songs in public places (especially next to churches), mainly on religious themes and moralizing colors (e.g., about saints, miraculous revelations, the end of the world, death, the fall of customs), which are commonly referred to as dziady's songs. In the eastern territories, a similar repertoire was performed with the accompaniment of the hurdy-gurdy by Ukrainian and Belarusian lirnyks, who were often also referred to as dziady, although despite some similarities, they essentially formed a separate group with a specific, different culture and methods of operation.

In the settled and not very mobile former rural communities, itinerant dziad was also one of the few sources of information about the world. They brought news from closer and further afield, told about sacred places, about life in other parts of the world, and about various unusual events (e.g. apparitions, wars, cataclysms, murders, etc.). Some of the dziady were also sometimes involved in small trade, selling mainly different kinds of devotional goods, although they should not be confused with wandering stalls, which formed a separate group trading in fairs and indulgences with different kinds of goods.

== The social position of dziady ==
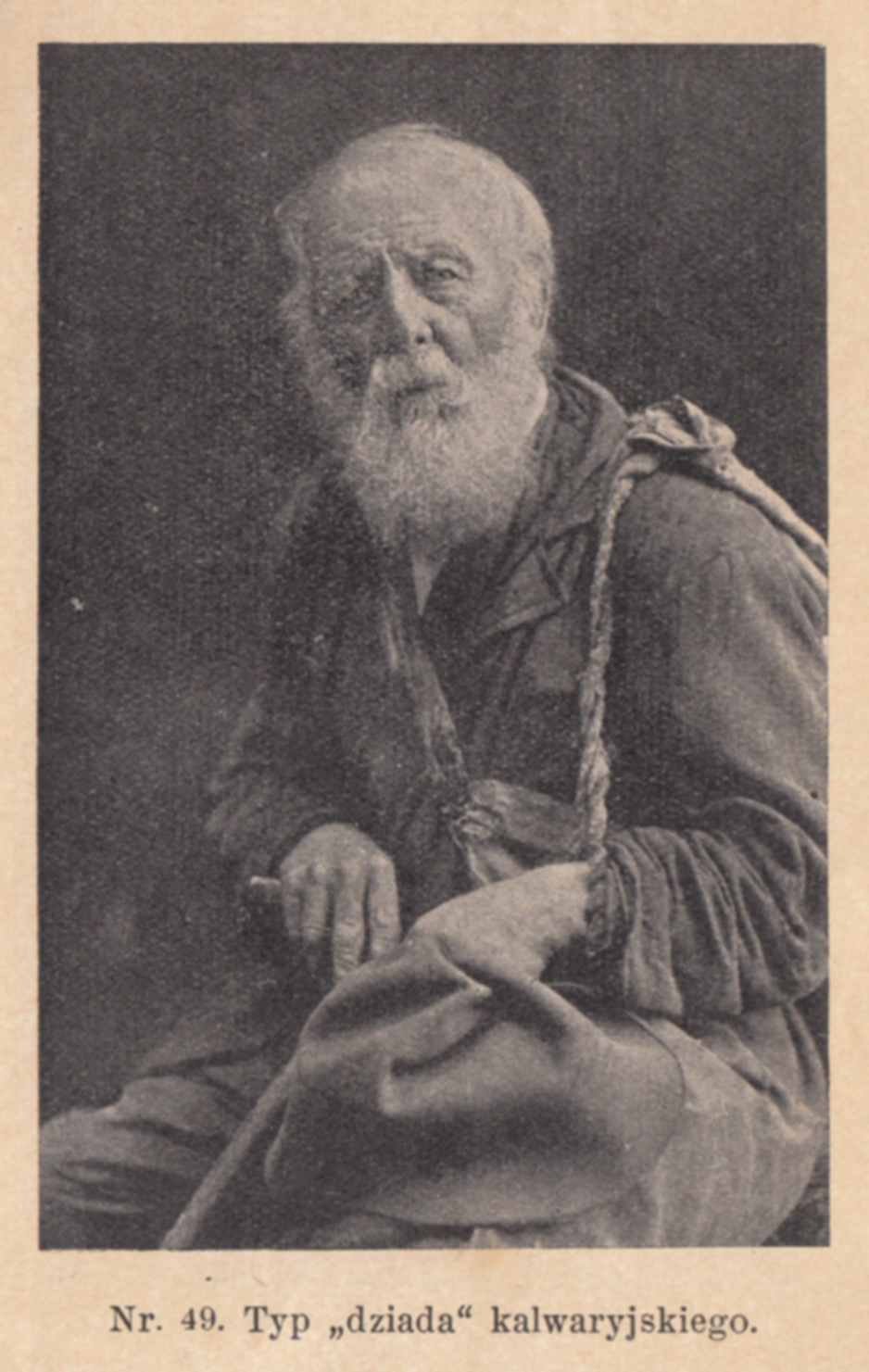
Portrait of a Calvarian dziad, 1938

Dziady came mainly from rural communities, from among people who for various reasons (illness, old age, lack of work) could not work on the land and in the 'dziady's craft' they sought a source of income. But sometimes there were also people with a certain education among them, whose various life paths (participation in wars, loss of property, conflicts with the law) forced them to undertake such activities. The position of dziady in traditional rural communities was generally very high. On the one hand, they were respected as pilgrims, 'God's wanderers', almost holy people with a broad knowledge of 'this' and 'that' world. For this reason, they were expected to arrive, were willingly accepted into people's homes and were generously donated. On the other hand, it was feared that the offended dziad might be dangerous and, for example, cast a curse on a host that was not very hospitable. Therefore, in the past, there was a common belief that wandering dziady could not be refused support.

In urban and modern communities dziady were very often treated as fraudsters who, under the 'cloak of misery', were looking for an easy income, in various, often sophisticated ways, using human naivety. They were accused of various types of deception (mainly simulation of disability), of evil deceit (theft, robbery, witchcraft), and of having a well-organized corporate activity (dziady's guilds, dziady kings), and of being rich.

World War II, and the social and political changes it brought about, put an end to the activity of itinerant dziady. With the gradual disintegration of traditional folk culture and the technical and world-view changes brought about by modernization, dziady ceased to be seen as representatives of the world of the dead or singers and providers of news, and thus ceased to perform important social functions. In addition, the socialist system introduced in Poland assumed a planned liquidation of the 'begging procedure', which significantly hindered the lives of the last representatives of this profession.

== Dziady in literature ==
The figure of a wandering dziad-beggar was a frequent literary motif. Already in the old Polish period, the first satirical dialogues depicting the environment of dziad in a parodistic way appeared (Peregrynacja dziadowska, Tragedia żebracza). In later periods, there are many works in which itinerant beggars play a greater or lesser role; the best-known include the novels by Józef Dzierzkowski (Król dziadów), Ignacy Kraszewski (Zygmuntowskie czasy), Edward Redliński (Konopielka) and Tadeusz Nowak (Wniebogłosy).

== See also ==
- Kobzar
- Lirnyk
- Blind musicians
- Russian wandering
- Kalika
