= Paraskeva Diveyevskaya =

Russian wanderer and nun

- Параскева Дивеевская
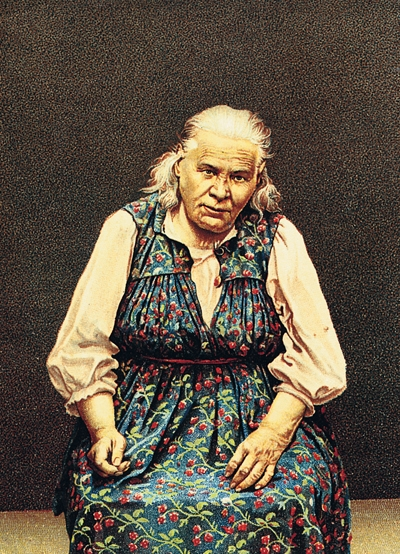
- Diveyevskaya in 1908. A lithograph
- Born: Irina Ivanovna (surname unknown) (Note: In this name that follows Eastern Slavic naming customs, the patronymic is Ivanovna.) between 1795 and 1807; Nikolskoye Village, Spassky Uyezd, Tambov Governorate, Russian Empire
- Died: 22 September 1915; Diveyevo, Russian Empire
- Occupations: Peasant servant; nun; fool

Paraskeva Diveyevskaya or Pasha Sarovskaya (Russian: Параскева Дивеевская; born between 1795 and 1807 – 22 September 1915) was a Russian fool for Christ and wanderer who became widely known at the turn of the 19th and 20th centuries. She met the Emperor Nicholas II, and, as legend has it, she predicted his abdication, tragic death, and canonization. Her meetings with Empresses Alexandra Feodorovna and Maria Feodorovna, as well as with Grand Duke Sergei Alexandrovich are documented. There are unconfirmed reports of an attempt by Grigory Rasputin and Anna Vyrubova to communicate with her.

Paraskeva Diveyevskaya is canonized and venerated by the Russian Orthodox Church as a blessed woman. In the Diveyevo Convent, where she spent the last part of her long life, her relics, now in the Kazan Church, are surrounded by veneration. In the house at the entrance to the monastery, where the Blessed lived, there is an exposition devoted to the history of the monastery. One of the rooms is dedicated to the memorial of Pasha Sarovskaya. Here the interior is reconstructed to the time of her life and authentic things of her belongings are kept.

== Biography ==
=== Childhood, adolescence, adulthood ===
Irina was born between 1795 and 1807 in the village of Nikolskoye, Spassky uyezd, Tambov province. Her parents' names were known as Ivan and Darya. They had three sons and two daughters, including Irina.

Irina was a peasant serf of the Bulygin landowners. At the age of seventeen, she was given in marriage against her will to her neighbor, the peasant Fyodor. In marriage, Irina was a model wife: "gentle, obliging, respectful, and industrious". Irina devoted much time to prayer. The couple did not have any children. Fifteen years later, the Bulygins sold Irina and her husband to their neighbors, the Schmidts, landowners. The Schmidts, German by birth, owned the village of Surkot, where their new serfs settled. Irina's husband died of tuberculosis five years later. When Pasha Sarovskaya was later asked what her husband was like, she replied: "but as stupid as me".

The Schmidts tried to marry Irina again, but she refused. It is known that from that time on she became a court servant: the masters entrusted her with guarding the house (according to her biographer Leonid Chichagov, she became a cook and a housekeeper in the masters' house). When two of the masters' paintings disappeared, the servants, afraid of Irina's honesty, began to claim that Irina had stolen them. At the request of the gentlemen, the bailiff ordered Irina to be beaten, during which she had her ears torn off and her head pierced. A fortune-teller was called in, who reported that the paintings had indeed been stolen from a certain Irina, but from another. The kidnapper drowned the canvases in the river, where they were later found.

Irina fled from her masters to a convent in Kyiv, but was discovered by the police. She was captured and imprisoned, and then it was decided to send the fugitive to her homeland. The owners wanted to make up for the cruelty they had inflicted, so they forgave Irina's escape and made the fugitive a gardener. Irina worked for her masters for two years, but then she escaped a second time. Once again, the police found Irina in Kyiv. This time her masters "stripped her naked, half-dressed, without a piece of bread... threw her out on the street and forbade her to show her face". For five years she "wandered" around the village, considered a madwoman by those around her. It is not known where she went later, before she moved to the Sarov forest. Both the author of the first complete hagiography of the Saint and Leonid Chichagov allowed her to continue living in her own village. Undoubtedly, the author of the complete hagiography considered that in Kyiv Irina took a secret tonsure (Note: Hagiography of Paraskeva, published in the printing house of the Diveyevo monastery, states that she was tonsured in the Great Scheme, but in pre-revolutionary biographies such detail is absent. Acceptance of the great scheme in Kiev is accepted as a fact and candidate of philosophical sciences Alexei Ilyin.) with the name of Paraskeva and began to call herself Pasha. He did not specify the date of this event. Leonid Chichagov, however, believed that the Kyiv monks not only performed the tonsure, but also blessed Irina for her stupidity. The author of the book about Pasha, published by the Holmushins Publishing House, attributed the tonsure to Irina's visit to Kyiv after her expulsion from the Schmidts. Another version was held by the hegumen Serafim (Kuznetsov), who knew the blessed Pasha personally: according to him, this event took place after the second escape from the Schmidts. The author of the book about her, published by the Maximov Publishing House, on the contrary, dates the reception of the tonsure of Paraskeva to the time immediately after the death of her husband, when, according to the author, she visited the Kyivo-Pechersk Lavra.

According to the testimony of the nuns of the Diveyevo Convent, preserved by the authors of two prerevolutionary biographies of Pasha Sarovskaya, she was blessed by Seraphim of Sarov himself for her wandering life in the dense forests. The local historian and Nizhny Novgorod Prize laureate Olga Bukova, after analyzing both Leonid Chichagov's Chronicle and his notes on the motives of its composition, came to the conclusion that Pasha Sarovskaya and Seraphim of Sarov never met. The researcher's point of view caused a storm of indignation among the readers of the magazine Blagodatniy Ogon, where Bukova's article was published. The editorial board of the magazine supported the researcher.

Paraskeva stayed in the Sarov forest for about 30 years. She lived in "caves" that she "dug" for herself. Sometimes she visited Sarov and Diveyevo, and was often seen at the Sarov monastery mill, where she came to work. Paraskeva endured hardships without complaint. Local peasants and travelers who came to Sarov surrounded the ascetic with veneration, bringing her food and money, which she immediately distributed to the poor. One day robbers demanded money from Paraskeva, which she did not have, and they beat her. For a year after that she was between life and death, but she managed to recover. After that she was tormented by headaches (the severe head injury Pasha received from the robbers was mentioned by Leonid Chichagov) and a tumor formed under the spoon.

=== Diveyevo Convent ===
Paraskeva appeared at the Holy Trinity Seraphim-Diveyevo Convent in the fall of 1884. It is believed that she discovered the gift of clairvoyance there. Approaching the gates of the monastery, Pasha struck a pillar and said: "As soon as I smash this pillar, they will begin to die, you will only have time to dig graves". Then the nun Pelagia Ivanovna, the priest of the convent and several nuns died. The locals took the jester's words as a fulfilled prophecy.

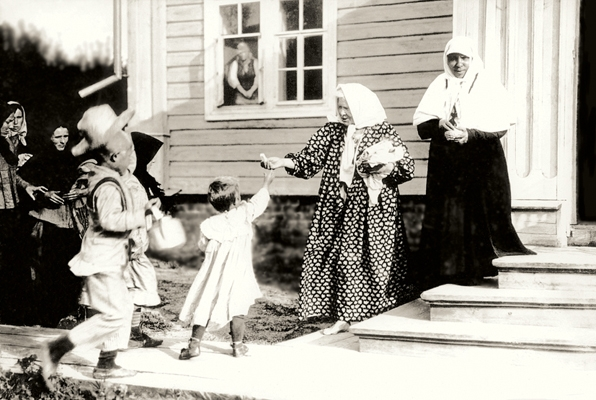
Paraskeva Diveyevskaya on the porch

The author of the first complete biography of Paraskeva noted that she had "a desire to move constantly from place to place. For a long time she refused to settle down in a monastery, explaining as follows: "No, it is impossible for me, this is my way, I must always move from place to place! Even when she was old, she moved "from one cell to another, from the cloister to the monastery farms, 'on distant obedience', in Sarov, to his former favorite places". During her wanderings, Pasha held in her hand a simple stick "which she calls a cane, a knot with various things, a sickle on her shoulder, and several dolls behind her sinews. This appearance of the Blessed Pasha, with her curly gray hair and wonderful blue eyes, now in her old age, involuntarily attracts the attention of everyone. She sometimes beat people she met with a cane, exposing them as cheats or thieves. In the knot in disorder were crusts, peeled peas, cucumbers, grass, children's knitted mittens, "in the first finger of which money is tied", rags, wooden crosses, a large number of handkerchiefs.

Leonid Chichagov connected the permanent settlement of Pasha Sarovskaya in the Diveyevo Convent with the death of another blessed Pelagia Ivanovna. Before that, according to him, relying on the testimony of the nun Anna Gerasimovna, who knew both fools well, Pasha only stopped by the Diveyevsky Convent and stayed here only for a short time. For a time Pasha settled in the clergy building, but after a week she began to complain about the cold at the door where she had to sleep.

Paraskeva changed her residence several times, until she finally settled in a house located near the monastery gates. In this separate house-keeper Paraskeva and settled in Diveyevo. She lived here for a long time together with the nun Anna Ivanovna, who was in charge of the convent shop. According to the description of one of her contemporaries, in the house there was a big wooden bed with big pillows on which dolls lay. "She takes care of them with tenderness, feeds them, washes them, sews them and dresses them. There is one doll whose entire head has come off from frequent washing," he wrote. It was believed that when it was time for someone in the convent to die, Paraskeva would take out her favorite doll and start dressing it up as the deceased. Leonid Chichagov added that among the Blessed's dolls there were not only favorite dolls (which she carefully surrounded and played with), but also unloved ones. She demonstrated some of her prophecies to visitors with the help of dolls. The doll was also the most precious gift for Pasha Sarovskaya. According to Chichagov, there was a bed, a chest of drawers, a table and a chest in the cell. The nuns hung icons in the rooms, a lamp, gave her a pillow, a blanket, a samovar, tea, sugar, a cup and everything that was necessary for life.

All night long Pasha Sarovskaya was at prayer, and only in the morning she went to bed for a while, but "only a little light dawns, for she has already risen and begun her prayer". Pasha associated prayer "with all her work, especially with reaping grass, so that to reap grass for someone, in her allegorical language, means to go and pray for someone". It has been observed that when Pasha "burns and gives a visitor a burdock or some weedy grass, it foretells near misfortune for the guest". When Pasha was in her cell, she knitted stockings or spun yarn with an inner Jesus prayer. Therefore, Pasha's yarn was highly valued in the convent — belts and rosaries were made from it. Seraphima (Bulgakova) reported that when Pasha gave the future Archbishop of Voronezh Peter a hand-woven canvas, he made a bishop's vestment from it and did not part with it until his death. Paraskeva also baked rolls and pies, which she usually sent as a gift to the abbess.

If one of the nuns missed a prayer service, Pasha would raise a cry, "and sometimes she would teach the offender with her cane". The young nuns were not to be tolerated if they spent time in idle conversation. From the young nuns, she demanded uninterrupted work and could not tolerate them spending time in idle conversation. Nor did Pasha tolerate disorder. She would shout: "What is this, you lazy women, take a cloth at once and wipe off the dust!" She often visited the nuns who lived in the world.

In her old age, Paraskeva rarely went to church. Every day before, she performed ablutions. During the service, she usually took a seat at the entrance or even on the porch. Sometimes she stood on her knees for the entire service. She seldom took communion, but often prayed in the field, in the upper room, or in the street after kneeling. Chichagov thought that the reason for this desire was to pray at the call of the heart, not according to the rules. The Virgin Mary Pasha was often called "Mammy behind the glass".

Although she knew several prayers by heart, she preferred to pray in her own words. She sought God's blessing before every action. A contemporary noted a special love of Pasha for icons: she altar lamps in front of them, decorated them with flowers, placed favorite things in front of them and kissed them. In summer, early spring, and even late fall, Pasha Sarovskaya would leave the convent for the field or grove, where she would spend several days "in fasting, prayer, and physical labor". According to eyewitnesses, Pasha could rise above the ground during prayer.

Some of her visitors Pasha received affectionately, sitting at the table, serving tea, bowing to some at her feet; on the contrary, she shouted at others, drove them out of the cell, threatened them with a stick. Contemporaries were convinced that this manifested the woman's ability to distinguish "true piety from artificial, pharisaical piety". She often talked with an imaginary interlocutor (in Chichagov's interpretation with the invisible world), and spoke about herself in the third person, sometimes answering not to the expressed questions, but to the secret thoughts of the interlocutor. In the days of her "struggle with the enemy of humanity" Pasha spoke silently and unintelligibly, broke things, broke dishes, could not find a place in her excitement, shouted and swore.

=== Predictions ===
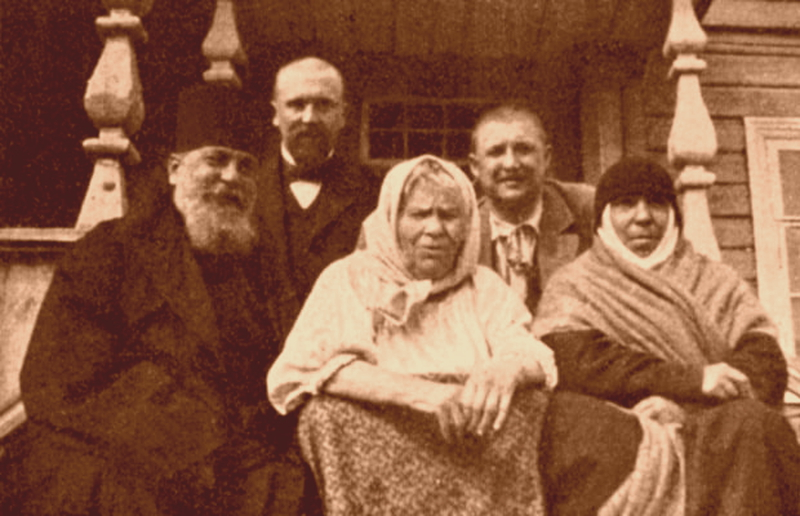
Blessed Pasha Sarovskaya (center) on the porch with Archimandrite Serafim (Chichagov) and nun Serafima, 1890s

This is how a contemporary described the mission of Pasha Sarovskaya:

With her words (often mysterious) and actions (often strange) she serves as a living reminder to the nuns of Diveyevo and its visitors of the higher purpose of life, rebuking some, comforting others, correcting the lost, supporting the weak and cowardly, protecting the defenseless! Experiencing all sorts of difficulties inevitable in a wandering life, she calls Christians by the example of her life to care more for the one thing that is needed than for perishable earthly goods. She was a voluntary martyr, constantly dying to the world, the flesh and the devil for the sake of life in Christ... The gift of discernment adorned this ascetic of piety.

The enigmatic nature of Pasha's words was emphasized by hegumen Seraphim (Kuznetsov), who knew her well and wrote about the frequent misinterpretation of Pasha Sarovskaya's words: "Listening attentively to her forthcoming formidable predictions, though expressed in parables, but all her cell-mates and I understood well and deciphered the unclear. Many things she revealed to me then, which I did not understand as it was necessary..." (Note: Archimandrite Theophan erroneously attributed this quotation to Hegumen Seraphim Putyatin.)

The Russian Orthodox writer and philosopher Sergei Nilus gave an example of Pasha Sarovskaya's prophecy. Sitting at the table, she asked to replace the wooden spoon with a silver one. Pasha took off the top half of a peeled and sliced cucumber, salted it, bit off a piece of it, chewed it quickly and spit it out, first in a bowl of milk, then in the spittoon at his feet. She spread the remaining cucumbers on the bottom of the bowl in a circle and counted them twice. Each time she set the bowl aside and "muttered with some solemn mystery": "Seven". She said, "Seven. According to Nilus, "the cucumber, under its skin and flesh, hides in its seeds the mystery of life, and is therefore suitable for symbolizing the mystery of world life," about which Sergei Nilus himself wrote in his writings. Pasha's disregard for milk was meant to demonstrate the importance of God's innermost mysteries. The cucumber, peeled and cut lengthwise and placed on top of the others, was to signify that "the solid food of the knowledge of the mysteries of God is higher than the knowledge of others and is purified by her [Pasha Sarovskaya's] reverential-martyr life, and therefore the mystery of God is as open to her as the inside of the whole length of the cut cucumber is open". The salting of the cucumber meant that the knowledge of the mysteries of God was offered not only by her actions, but also by God's grace.

The silver spoon symbolized "the liturgical teaching of the mysteries of Christ. Spitting out chewed cucumber pieces, according to Nilus, meant "solid food, and perhaps my [Nilus's] sermon comes to spiritual nourishment in most cases, or to those who are spiritually able to eat only milk, or to those who spit it out in defilement, as in a spittoon, with laughter and mockery". The number seven, in turn, signifies the coming end of times. The permission given after the meal to Nilus and his wife to take an unpeeled and uncut cucumber and to eat it with his wife "was to signify that I, too, with my friend, have joined the knowledge of the same mysteries as the Blessed, but not to her measure, not to the measure of the purification of her spiritual vision".

Sergei Nilus perceived Pasha Sarovskaya as the successor of the Blessed Pelagia Ivanovna of Diveyevo. He confessed that at their first meeting, in 1900, Pasha "saw her, not without a secret eerie fear, on the veranda of her cell. When he went to her cell, she was resting and would not let anyone in. Nilus could only enter "her room, which was hung with icons, and pray. The Blessed was lying behind a screen. Nilus heard her whispering: "For God, a candle! My God - a candle! My God - a candle!" The scribe confessed: "To whom these words referred and what their mysterious meaning was, remained unclear to me". During a new visit to Diveevo in 1902, before meeting the Pasha, Nilus sent a novice to her to find out what mood she was in. According to him, he was afraid that the saint would hit him. Pasha's visit embarrassed the writer: "No sooner had I crossed the threshold than on my left, from behind the door, from the floor, something gray-haired, mousy and, it seemed to me, frightening as if to jump up, yes, as if to rush past me storming to the exit with the words:" I can't buy for a nickel. You'd better go and drink tea to wet your throat". That was the blessed one. Nilus guessed that it was a gold coin of five rubles, which he took from his purse into his pocket to give to Pasha. The third meeting shocked Nilus: the Blessed One accepted from him a gift of 20-40 roubles in silver and gold, talked to him while sitting on the floor among the dolls, gave him a prophecy that later came true, and reminded him of a long-forgotten sin he had committed in his youth.

Seraphima (Bulgakova) claimed that it was Pasha Sarovskaya who initiated the glorification of Seraphim of Sarov and asked Leonid Chichagov to write a petition to the tsar. At her request, Chichagov wrote the Chronicle of the Diveyevsky Monastery and presented it to Nicholas II, who became interested in the personality of Seraphim of Sarov. All this, according to Seraphima, was described in detail by Chichagov in the second part of the Chronicle, but it perished in 1937. (Note: Leonid Chichagov's notes have been preserved, in which he tells about the motives that led him to write the Chronicle. In these notes he tells the story told by Serafima, but he attributes the initiative to glorify Seraphim of Sarov not to Pasha of Sarov, but to another "blessed visionary" - Pelageya, who in the world (!) was called Paraskeva (Pasha).) When the Holy Synod opposed the discovery of the relics, Paraskeva made Chichagov (then an archimandrite) take a shovel, come out of his cell, and say: "Dig to the right, here are the relics".

Hegumen Seraphim, in one of his four articles about the Blessed, said that she predicted the First World War, asked those around her to pray for the victory of Russia, predicted the capture of Lviv by Russian troops, and blessed Seraphim himself to take part in the hostilities. She regarded the war as God's punishment for the sins of the Russian people. In another later work, Hegumen Seraphim claimed that, according to the Blessed, "the war was started by our enemies to overthrow the Tsar and tear Russia apart. She called the internal enemies of the sovereign allies of the devil, and Wilhelm II Goliath.

Death War I, Paraskeva prayed and fasted so fervently for Russia that she became like a skeleton. Sergei Nilus, who saw the Blessed shortly before her death, wrote: "It was no longer the former Paraskeva Ivanovna, it was her shadow, coming from the other world. Totally shrunken, once full, now thin face, sunken cheeks, huge, wide-open, out-of-this-world eyes formed the eyes of St. Prince Vladimir in Vasnetsov's depiction of the Kyiv Vladimir Cathedral: the same his gaze, as if over the world in the first room, to the throne of God, in the vision of the great mysteries of the Lord. It was uncanny and at the same time joyful to look at it".

Praskovya Ivanovna died in the Diveyevo Convent on September 22 [October 5], 1915 at 2:30 am. Candidate of Philosophy Alexei Ilyin, without mentioning the source of his information (Seraphima (Bulgakova) has a similar report), wrote: "Before her own demise, she kissed the portrait of Nicholas II with the words: My little one is already at the end". Igor Lysenko, a candidate of theology and philosophical sciences, claimed (based on a report in Serafima) that the Blessed One prayed and "bowed" before the portrait of the Emperor before her death, saying: "He should have been higher than all other tsars". Bulgakova even stated that Pasha Sarovskaya had two portraits of Nicholas II: one and two with his wife, but she bowed only before the first one. In fact, Hegumen Seraphim wrote in his memoirs that Paraskeva placed the portraits of the Tsar, the Tsarina and their children "in the front corner" together with the icons and "prayed on them on a par with the icons".

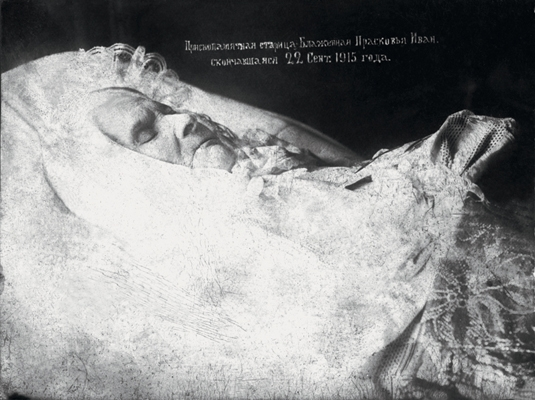
Paraskeva Diveyevskaya at the funeral, October 1915

Hegumen Seraphim described the death of the Blessed in a different way: he reported that Paraskeva looked lovingly at the abbess of the monastery, then sighed quietly three times and died "quietly, calmly, without suffering, as if she had fallen asleep in a strong sweet sleep after great labors". In another article, the hegumen wrote that in her last days and hours she often repeated: "Father Seraphim, take me home". On the death of Paraskeva he wrote in the magazine Golos Dolga: "Diveevo was plunged into deep mourning, the grave news, passed from mouth to mouth, caused everywhere unanimous tears, general mourning. Those who saw her, those who heard about her, those who have great sorrow, will echo this news. The name of the deceased was close to the Russian people throughout the vast expanses of the Russian land, because they knew and heard about her everywhere, even in distant Siberia and on distant seas, where God's prayers brought touching stories about Blessed Pasha Sarovskaya".

She was buried near the monastery's Trinity Cathedral. The funeral was simple and, according to a contemporary, "not with pomp, but with bitter tears". A simple wooden cross was placed on a mound of earth. Here were also the graves of two other revered blessed of the Diveyevo Convent — Pelageya Ivanovna and Natalya Dmitrievna. Near this place there was a big larch.

== Nicholas II and his circle ==
=== Meeting with Nicholas II ===
On July 20 (August 2), 1903, Nicholas II wrote in his Diary:

At 10 we arrived at the Diveyevo monastery. In the house church of Mother Mary, the abbess, we had Mass. Then everyone sat down for breakfast, and Alix and I went to see Praskovya Ivanovna. It was a strange visit. Then we both ate, and mom and the others visited her.

Based on this testimony, which states that there were no witnesses to the meeting between the Emperor and the Blessed except the Empress, historian Konstantin Kapkov considers other testimonies about this meeting to be legendary. (Note: Sergei Nilus, referring to the report of Paraskeva Diveyevskaya's nurse, confirmed that there were no witnesses during the conversation. The nurse claimed that the Blessed had dressed in white for the meeting, bowed deeply to Nicholas and Alexandra and predicted the birth of the heir before the nurse herself left the room.) Grand Duke Sergei Alexandrovich wrote in his diary about his meeting with Pasha Sarovskaya on the same day: "A strange impression!" The emperor's diary entry about the meeting with the Blessed Mother is supplemented by the memories of Varvara Schneider. The Empress asked her if she had seen the Pasha Sarovskaya. Schneider confessed that she was afraid that "as a nervous person, reading in my eyes a critical attitude towards her, she would get angry and do something, hit or something like that," so she did not enter into conversation with the Blessed. Schneider, in turn, asked if it was true that "when the Emperor wanted to take jam for tea, the Pasha struck him on the arm and said: "No sweet for you, you'll eat bitter all your life!" — "Yes, it is true," replied Alexandra Feodorovna.

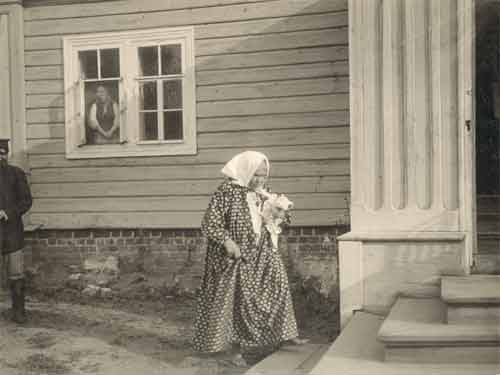
Paraskeva Diveyevskaya on the porch of her house

One of the legendary testimonies belongs to Archpriest Stefan Lyashevsky. He claimed that when Nicholas II arrived at the Blessed Mother's house, the chairs were removed and a carpet was spread on the floor. A large number of witnesses allegedly barely managed to enter Paraskeva Ivanovna's room with the royal couple. Sitting on the bed, Paraskeva demanded to be left alone with them. The courtiers went away, but the novice pasha remained. She asked the emperor and his wife to sit on the floor (which, according to the interpreters, symbolized the Dno station, where the emperor abdicated). Then she predicted "the ruin of Russia, the dynasty, the defeat of the Church and a sea of blood". When Alexandra Feodorovna said that all this could not be, the Pasha gave her a piece of cloth with the words: "This is your son for pants, when he is born, believe what I said". According to another variant of this version, Pasha also held out a boy doll. The writer and philosopher Eugene Schiffers claimed about the prediction of his son's birth that such an event is impossible to invent, and if it is a fiction, it belongs to a genius equal to Pushkin.

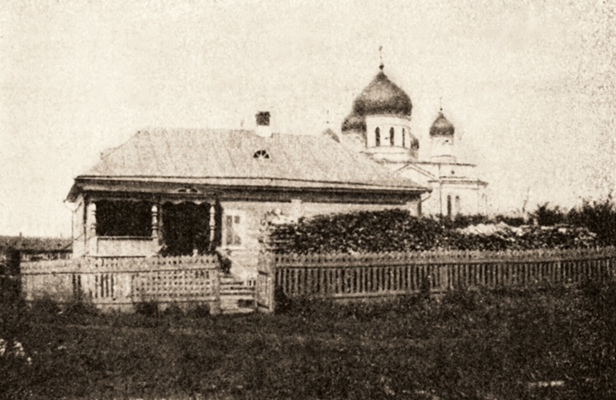
Paraskeva Diveyevskaya's cell at the beginning of the 20th century

Dr. Sergei Firsov, a doctor of historical sciences, wrote that Paraskeva gave the royal couple a doll. Regarding the claim that this could be seen as a prediction of the birth of a child, he wrote: "It is hard to judge. "But blessed is the one who believes." In his opinion, "the visit of the Blessed One became overgrown in time with rumors and myths, in which the simple truth was obscured: 'tsars' needed 'signs' to help them 'correctly understand' the will of God". The prediction was reflected in the kondak composed in honor of Paraskeva of Diveev: "Hail, Paraskeva of Sarov, who prophesied the birth of the tsarevich-martyr to the royal Passion-bearers".

Alexei Ilyin, without citing sources, wrote that the abbess persuaded Pasha to clean the cell on the eve of the reception of the distinguished guests, but the blessed woman met the first persons of the state as "ordinary guests: a samovar with tea and a pan with potatoes. (Note: According to the nun Seraphima Pasha, Sarovskaya prevented the cleaning of the room only until the arrival of the distinguished guests. When they entered, the room was cleaned in their presence.) "Everywhere I am received as a tsar, and only here as a man," said Nicholas II. Otherwise, Ilyin sticks to the traditional legendary version, but does not go into details. Paraskeva predicted the catastrophe that would befall Russia: "the birth and illness of the heir, the death of the Romanov dynasty, the persecution of the Church, and a sea of blood". The details of this story are recorded in the memoirs of the nun Serafima (Bulgakova). During the royal couple's visit to the cell, "the carpet was laid, the table was cleaned, a hot samovar was immediately brought. Everyone went out and left them alone, but they could not understand what Pasha was saying, and soon the sovereign came out and said: "The eldest is with her, come in"... They started to say goodbye... Praskovya Ivanovna opened the chest of drawers. She took out a new tablecloth, spread it on the table, and began to place her guests: a canvas of linen of her own making (she spun the threads herself), some sugar, colored eggs, more sugar in pieces. All this she tied in a knot... and gave it to the emperor in his hands. They said goodbye, kissing hand in hand". Serafima added another detail that has been omitted by modern scholars: "The sovereign had no money with him, which was sent immediately. It was brought, and the sovereign gave her a purse of gold. This purse was immediately given to the mother of the hegumess".

Another legendary testimony says that the Pasha asked for "nine clay soldiers and a pot of boiled potatoes...When the Emperor entered, Paraskeva Ivanovna took a stick and shook the heads of all the soldiers, predicting their martyrdom, and offered potatoes for the meal, which meant the severity of their last days".

Another version (without reference to the original source) was quoted by Dr. Alexander Bokhanov, Doctor of Historical Sciences. In his opinion, for Nicholas II as an Orthodox Christian, "conversations with the people of God have long been commonplace". Among the things he attributed to the emperor's soul were "the prophecies of Yurodiva Pasha from the Sarov desert ('the cloister')". Bokhanov did not describe the circumstances of the meeting of the Yurodiva and the Emperor, but claimed that she had predicted to him in 1903 "and the war with Japan, and the murder of his uncle — Grand Duke Sergei Alexandrovich". The source of this information is revealed by Sergei Firsov, a doctor of historical sciences. The story of the conversation between the tsar and the blessed mistress of one of the largest secular salons in St. Petersburg and the memoirist Alexandra Bogdanovich heard in 1910 from a future colleague of the chief prosecutor of the Holy Synod, Prince Nicholas Zhevakhov. Nicholas II once asked him if he had seen Pasha (the emperor himself, he said, "had been able to see her"). Paraskeva predicted war with Japan and then began beating one of her dolls, calling it "Sergei." Bogdanovich recorded what she heard in her diary, but with the remark: "The tsar should not tell this to Zhevakhov, and he should not spread it”. According to Firsov, Sergei was not the Grand Duke Sergei Alexandrovich, as Bokhanov decided, but the statesman and politician Sergei Witte, to whom Nicholas II felt antipathy. Firsov accepted Bogdanovich's testimony and emphasized that Pasha Sarovskaya was perceived by the tsar as a "political soothsayer".

Hegumen Seraphim claimed that Pasha Sarovskaya predicted the birth of an heir in a conversation with the monastery treasurer as early as 1895, when she predicted that four girls would be born first, followed by the boy. Seraphim himself heard this personally from the treasurer Alexandra in 1915.

=== Contemporary reactions ===
The modern hagiography of Paraskeva Diveyevskaya, published in the Diveyevo Convent, states on the basis of the testimony of Serafima (Bulgakova) that after the meeting in Diveyevo "the Emperor turned to Praskovya Ivanovna with all serious questions, sent to her Grand Dukes. Evdokia Ivanovna said that no sooner had one left than another arrived". The historian Konstantin Kapkov, presenting this version, also wrote that the meeting made a strong impression on the tsar and he sent the Grand Dukes to her. The modern hagiography, based on the report of the nun Serafima, claims that the Grand Dukes came to her even before the visit of the Empress: "They brought her a silk dress and a bonnet with which they immediately dressed her". After the Pasha predicted the birth of an heir, "the Grand Dukes took the Blessed Mother in their arms and began to rock her, but she only laughed". Sergei Firsov pointed out that such claims "met with resistance and sharp criticism" among the clergy.

Serafima (Bulgakova) preserved information about the arrival in Diveyevo of Anna Vyrubova and Grigory Rasputin. According to her, Rasputin arrived with a whole retinue of young ladies-in-waiting. He was afraid to enter Pasha Sarovskaya's house and remained on the veranda. The pasha rushed at the women with a stick as they entered. When Vyrubova arrived, she ordered to find out what Pasha was doing. She was told that she was tying three sticks together with a belt, and accompanied this action with the words: "Ivanovna, Ivanovna, how are you going to hit me? - Right on the snout! She overturned the whole palace! Vyrubova was not allowed to meet the blessed woman.

One of the leaders of the Black Hundred Hieromonk Iliodor (Sergey Trufanov), a protégé of Grigory Rasputin and the author of notes about him, considered by some historians to be an adventurer, visited Pasha Sarovskaya and one of the leaders of the Black Hundred Hieromonk Iliodor (Sergey Trufanov). She took off his clobuk, cross, all orders and medals. She put everything into a chest, locked it and hung the key on her belt. Then she ordered a box to be brought, put an onion in it, watered it and said: "Onions, grow tall." Then she went to bed. The keys to the Blessed One's belt were tied to her side, but she slept on the other side, so she managed to untie the keys and give them to Iliodorus. A few years later he was stripped of his dignity — Paraskeva's actions were taken as a prophecy.

Bishop Theophan of Simferopol and Tauris recalled that in 1911 he visited Pasha Sarovskaya in his cell. He was not wearing any vestments during the visit. The Pasha threw a piece of white cloth into Theophanes' lap. When he unfolded it, he saw the shroud of the deceased, but the saint snatched it from his hands. The Pasha murmured: "The Mother of God will save! The Most Holy Mother of God will save! Pasha jumped on the pew, tore the portrait of Nicholas II from the wall and threw it on the floor. She did the same with the portrait of the Empress. Pasha ordered her nurse to take the portraits to the attic. Theophanes, the emperor's confessor, informed him of the prophecy: "The emperor was silent and bowed his head. He said not a word about what had been reported... Only at the very end did he thank me".

== Appearance ==
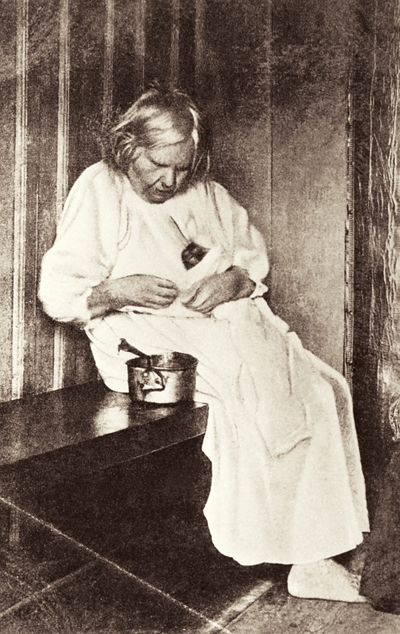
Paraskeva Diveyevskaya in her cell with a kitten, late 19th century

The Russian publicist and philosopher Leonid Obolensky described the appearance of the Pasha Sarovskaya in 1905 as follows:

On the porch of the old house stood a fat, gray-haired old woman, bent low over a pile of grass that lay at her feet. Her head was uncovered, and her hair, brushed back, hung in clumps around her head. She was wearing a rather short, sleeveless calico dress with large flowers. It was unbuttoned to the waist in front and open at the crotch. The old woman held something in her hand that she had probably used to cut the grass on the porch: wormwood, burdock, nettles. She was muttering incoherently and picking at the grass, bending over so far and turning her back to the audience that all her thick calves were visible under her short sundress. I stood there for a quarter of an hour, and she kept dropping the grass on the steps, and then picking it up and putting it on the porch platform. And she was still muttering to herself in a deep, bass voice, very angry and preoccupied.

Obolensky confessed that at first he had mistaken her for a servant. The fool, hearing the noise of the crowd in front of her house, broke out in profanity, threw a broom into the crowd, and entered the house, slamming the door. As she left, the fence of her house was breached by what the author describes as a "pure" crowd: young ladies in hats, decently dressed gentlemen, and teenagers in student uniforms. They stood humbly under the window and asked the Pasha for his blessing. Some of the crowd thought she was threatening people from behind the cloudy window, and several people ran away.

Leonid Chichagov claimed that originally Paraskeva had a pleasant appearance. As a result of asceticism and fasting, she acquired the features of Mary of Egypt. In his description Paraskeva appears thin and tall, her skin is almost black, as if "burned" by the sun. She has short hair, although she used to wear her hair long "down to the ground. Paraskeva cut it short because it was inconvenient for living in the forest "and did not correspond to the secret tonsure. She went barefoot and wore a man's monk's shirt unbuttoned at the chest. Her hands were bare, and her stern look, according to Chichagov, frightened those who did not know her well. The same author noted a serious change in the Blessed Mother as she grew older — she became very fat.

Depending on her mood, Paraskeva appeared to those around her stern and angry, then affectionate, then sad. In particular, Chichagov noted the Blessed's "childish kindness, bright, deep and clear eyes" —"they testify that all these peculiarities of hers, allegorical conversations, stern reprimands and antics— are only an outer shell, deliberately hiding the greatest humility, gentleness, love and compassion. The sundresses she wore gave her the appearance of a "gentle child". Paraskeva loved bright colors, especially red. Sometimes she wore several sundresses at once. Usually this happened when she received honorable guests or "as an omen of joy and cheerfulness for the person entering her house. On her head Paraskeva wore a cap and a peasant shawl. In summer she usually wore a shirt.

== Biography studies ==
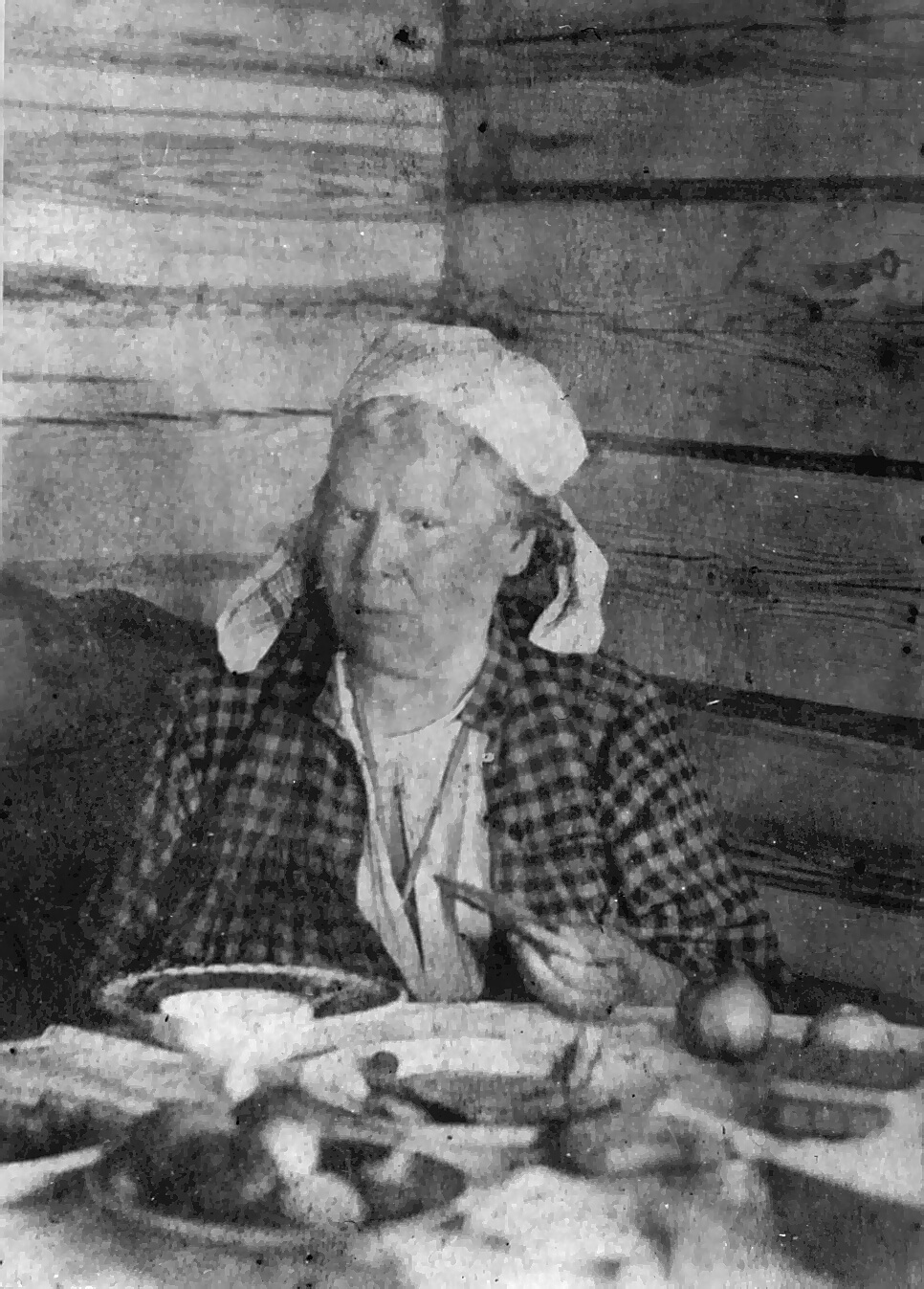
Paraskeva Diveyevskaya in her cell at the table

In 1905, the writer and philosopher Leonid Obolensky published an essay in the journal Vestnik Evropy entitled From Sarov Journey. Travel Impressions and Notes, in which he described his meeting with Pasha Sarovskaya and critically analyzed the text of an anonymous pamphlet about her, published in Sytin's publishing house. In the hagiography and in his own impressions from observing the blessed woman, he found a number of contradictions. If she spends all her time in prayer, how does she find time to quarrel with her admirers, to constantly observe that the sisters are not idle, to play with dolls and cut grass with a sickle?" Obolensky refused to recognize the words of Pasha Sarovskaya as prophecies. He wrote that in their case "it is not the facts that create faith, but faith that creates facts. It is the hypnosis of words that comes to the aid of faith". Obolensky also refused to recognize her words as prophecies. The author also drew attention to the fact that due to her condition the fool could not describe her moods, mental states, plans, so everything that the author of the hagiography reports in this respect is his own conjecture. In 1916, one of the leaders of the Black Hundreds in Perm, Hegumen Seraphim (Kuznetsov), published in the magazine Golos Dolga, which he himself edited, a series of four articles devoted to the life and exploits of Pasha Sarovskaya. The articles were also based on Seraphim's personal recollections of his meetings with Pasha Sarovskaya. He later recalled the Blessed Lady in the work Memoirs.

In Soviet times, Pasha Sarovskaya was commonly referred to as one of the "numerous domestic and imported miracle workers, seers, fortune tellers, and clichés," which included the occultist Papus, the praying mantis Daria Osipova, the wanderer Anton, the soothsayer Grippa, Mitya Kozelsky, and Vasily the Barefoot. It was believed that they "performed the function of the most trusted persons and advisors of Nicholas II and Alexandra Feodorovna" in the period after the deposition of the Frenchman Philip and before the appearance at the court of Grigory Rasputin. Doctor of Philosophy Alexander Grigorenko, citing the testimony of Sergei Trufanov, claimed that the tsar had a rule: "First he listens to the 'elders' and 'blessed', and then to the ministers".

After the canonization of Paraskeva in the publishing house of the Diveyevsky monastery several editions of a significant circulation of the book The Diveyev fools of Christ's sake Pelagia, Paraskeva and Maria were published, summarizing information about the life and miracles of the blessed, as well as containing information about the discovery of her relics and glorification. Paraskeva's biography is also popular in Archimandrite Theophanes' book The Blessed Saints. Stories about Extraordinary Ascetics, published in 2017 by AST Publishing House. Orthodox publicist Yuri Ryabinin dedicated a chapter to Pasha Sarovskaya in a book intended for a wide readership, Foolish Russia. History of Russian foolishness in faces and scenes.

Scientific articles and monographs of the early 21st century analyze certain aspects of Paraskeva's daily life and religiosity. Alexei Ilyin, candidate of philosophical sciences, associate professor of the Department of Practical Psychology of the Omsk State Pedagogical University, wrote about Paraskeva's loneliness in his article Ontology of Female Folishness. She had neither relatives nor friends. Dolls replaced her family, the Virgin Mary she "honored ... as the closest person". A significant place devoted to Pasha Sarovskaya Doctor of Historical Sciences Sergei Firsov in the book Nicholas II. Prisoner of Autocracy, published in 2010. Igor Lysenko, candidate of theology and philosophical sciences, teacher at the St. Petersburg Theological Academy, analyzed the life of the Emperor and his relationship with Pasha Sarovskaya in the article the Piety of Emperor Nicholas II as a Subject of Research (2008).

Ilona Motiejunaite, Doctor of Philology, Professor of the Literature Department of the Pskov State University, in her monograph Perception of the fool in Russian literature of the 19th-20th centuries studied the reflection of the hagiographic canon in the descriptions of fools in Russian literature. The material were the biographies of seven jesters of the 18th-20th centuries, including Pasha Sarovskaya. The researcher explained the deeds of the blessed not only by vocation, but also by "mourning for the lost beloved". The variety of predictions and the imbuing of objects with "unexpected, often arbitrary and individual meanings", according to the author, "testifies to the creative thinking of the fools". Pasha's use of dolls "has deep cultural roots".

Ludmila Ulitskaya, according to Motieyunaite, was partly inspired by the image of St. Diveev in the play Seven Saints: "In connection with the theme of motherhood, Dusya's playing with dolls is important. This motif links her image with that of the Pasha Sarovskaya". Two years later the author developed these ideas in the article Foolishness, love and motherhood in L. Ulitskaya's play Seven Saints".

Elena Grudeva's book Female foolishness in the Orthodox Church: the history and content of the feat analyzes the biographies of four female fools canonized by the Greek Orthodox Church and twelve by the Russian Orthodox Church, including Paraskeva Diveyevskaya. Grudeva noted that the Yurodiva walked barefoot all year long during her 30-year life in the Sarov forest. If the icon of Paraskeva is a growth icon, this fact is usually recorded. As a wanderer she is depicted with a staff or stick. The deeds of the Blessed are reflected in the prayer: "As a faithful wife and honest widow, for the truth exile and wanderer, secretly in the mantle of the tonsured nun and prisoner, the Sarov hermitess and martyr, the second blessed old woman of Diveyevo Convent".

Grudeva noted that the biography of Pasha traces the hagiographic standards of fools: a girl is to be married against her will, and she submits; the impetus for the deed was a tragic event; good deeds are done in secret; she has the gift of clairvoyance; spiritual ties bind her to other fools; prophecies are clothed in allegorical forms. According to Grudeva, Paraskeva surpassed other female fools in the number of unsocial acts, which are usually characteristic of men.

== Glorification and relics ==
External images
- | Paraskeva Diveyevskaya relics in the monastery
- | Tsar Nicholas II visiting the Blessed Paraskeva Sarovskaya. Wall painting of the Kazan Church of the Diveyevo Convent

On July 31, 2004, Paraskeva was declared a local saint of the Nizhny Novgorod diocese. Only two months later, on October 6, the Council of Bishops of the Russian Orthodox Church established her universal veneration. The relics of Blessed Paraskeva were found on September 20, 2004. It was known that a crypt was built for the burial, but no other news about the burial has survived. Orthodox writer and publicist Yuri Ryabinin claimed that under Soviet rule, a beer stand stood at the burial site of the three Diveevo saints for some time. It was allegedly demolished after the saleswoman began to see three old women who said nothing but stared at her intently.

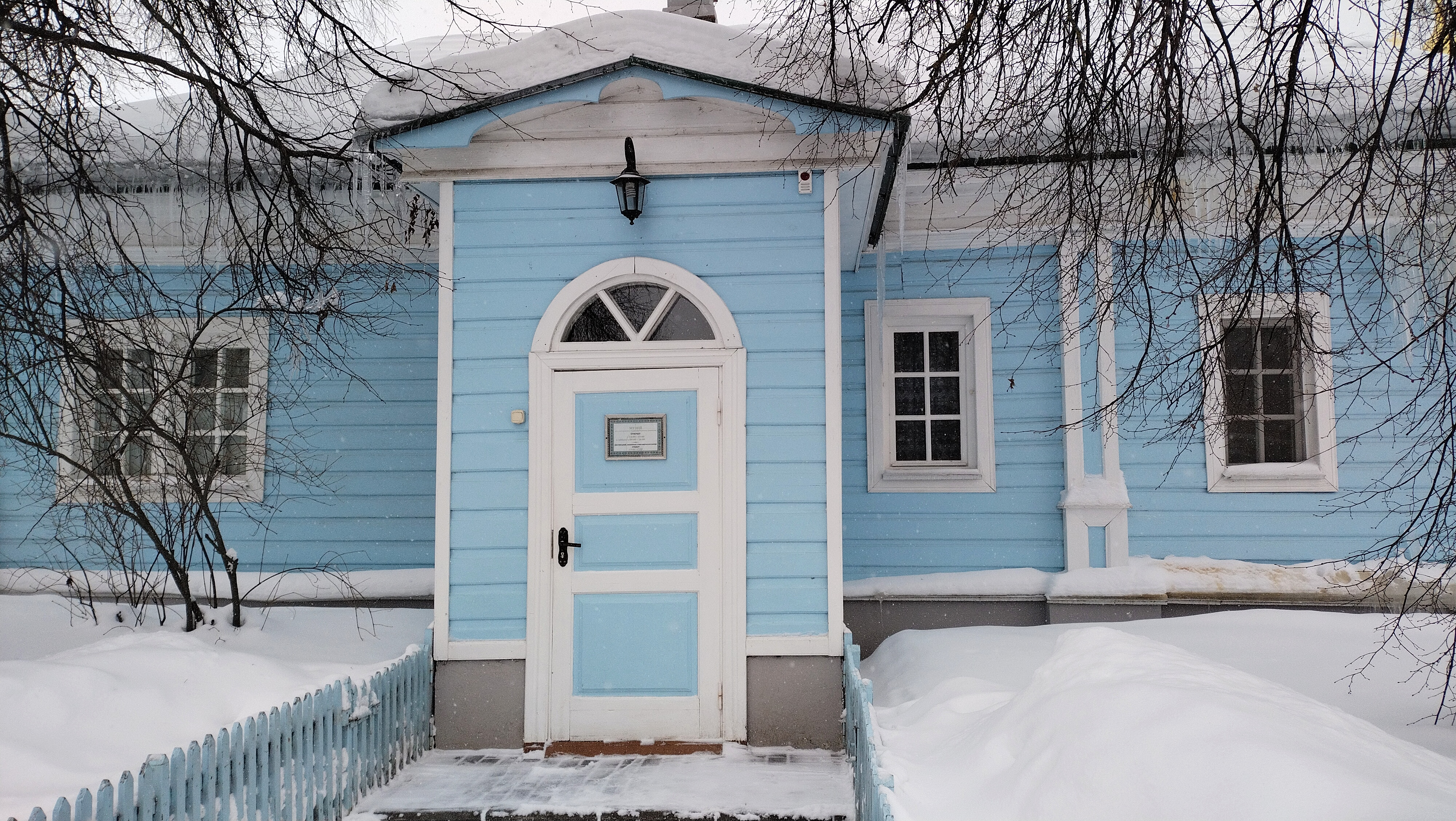
House-Museum of Paraskeva Diveyevskaya, February 2024

In the fall of 1990, partial excavations were made near the altar of the Holy Trinity Cathedral. On the basis of the researches, crosses were placed on the supposed graves of the Blessed. Later, as a result of new excavations in 2004, the remains of a crypt were discovered underground. The work was led by the archaeologist, senior researcher of the Department of Theory and Methodology of the Institute of Archaeology of the Russian Academy of Sciences Yuri Smirnov. The relics of Paraskeva were transferred to the Church of the Nativity. After their discovery they were there in simple upholstered coffins of white cloth, and then they were already transferred to shells. On January 14, 2005 the relics of Paraskeva were transferred to the Kazan Church.

Currently, Paraskeva's relics are kept in the Kazan church of the Serafimo-Diveyevo Convent. In 2004 the cottage where she lived was given to the monastery. At present it houses a museum of the history of the Diveyevo Convent with a memorial room of the Blessed Paraskeva.

After Paraskeva's death, another blessed woman of Diveev, Maria Ivanovna, lived in her cottage for two years. Even then it became a place of pilgrimage for the faithful. Until the monastery was closed, the Psalter was read in the cell of Blessed Paraskeva. Pilgrim Anatoly Timofievich described the cell in 1926: "It was a small one-story wooden house with a veranda under an iron roof, standing at the very gate of the monastery fence...we found ourselves in a small upper room where three doors led...Mother Cyprian led us into the cell of Blessed Paraskeva. The walls were covered with pictures, and what caught our attention was the beautifully crafted crucifixion in the middle of the cell... On the left, in the corner, was a large bed covered with a colorful blanket and many pillows. On the bed were dolls of various kinds, some of which had only the torso left": There was also a large bed covered with a colorful blanket and many pillows.

There are relics in the Diveyevo Convent: Paraskeva's pink shirt and blue dress, in which she took communion, as well as part of the canvas of her work and threads of her yarn, Paraskeva's sundress and shirt, an icon and a cypress cross from her crypt, a table with a samovar, a spinning wheel, household utensils on the stove, a handmade carpet, a bed with high pillows. The antique dolls now exhibited in her cell did not belong to Pasha Sarovskaya. However, the exposition presents a photo of one of her original dolls — a boy whom, according to legend, the Blessed called Kirik. He is now in France. Patriarch Kirill, who visited Pasha's house, left a note in the book of honored guests: "I am glad to see how the house of Pasha Sarovskaya has been restored. May everyone who visits this holy place and touches the spiritual work of the saint find her prayerful support. + Patriarch Kirill 1.08.2010". The cell of Pasha Sarovskaya has become one of the places of pilgrimage of the faithful. The believers consider touching its things as a grace.

Exposition fragments in the memorial room of Paraskeva Diveyevskaya

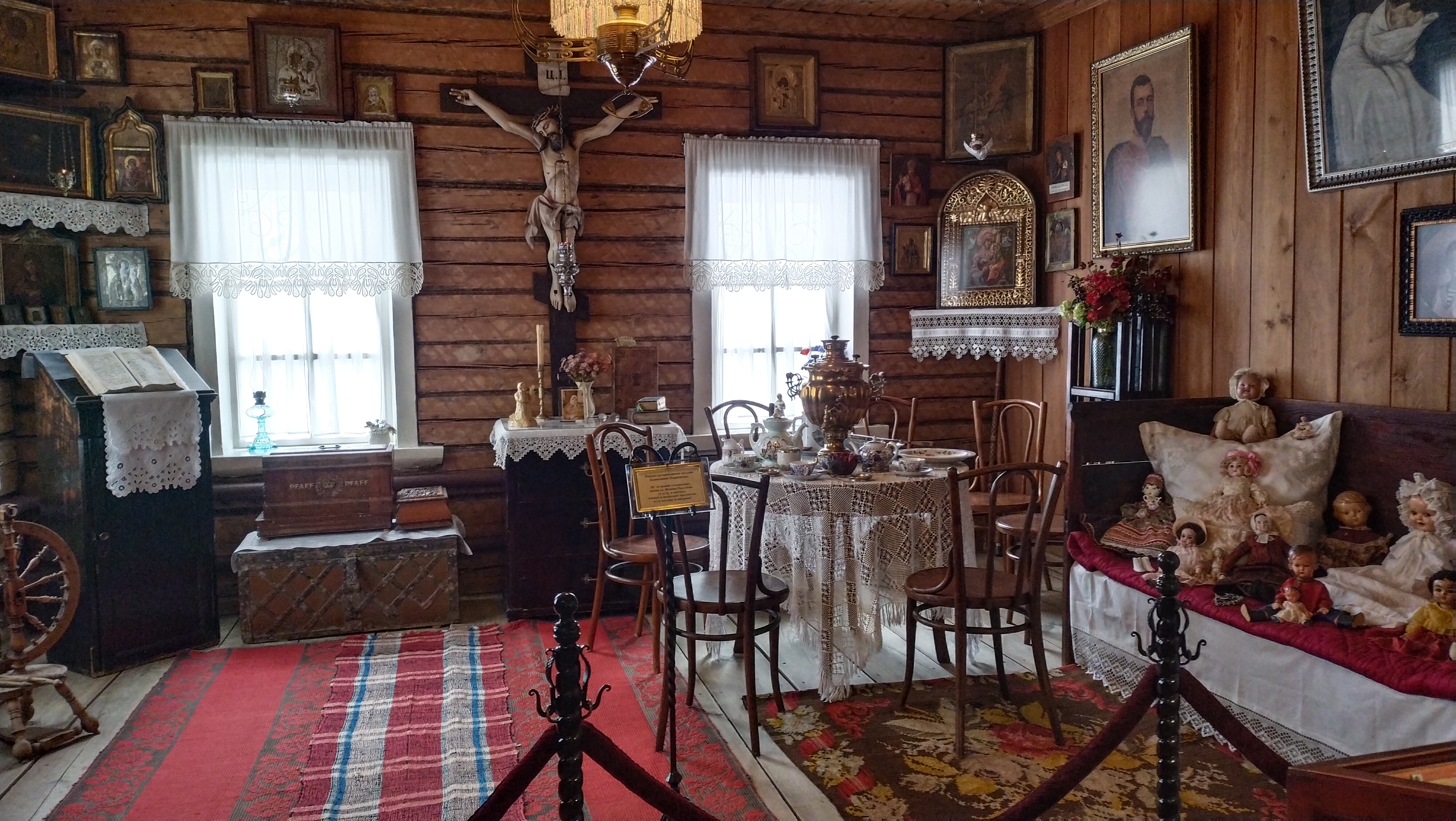
Paraskeva's memorial room reconstructed. February, 2024

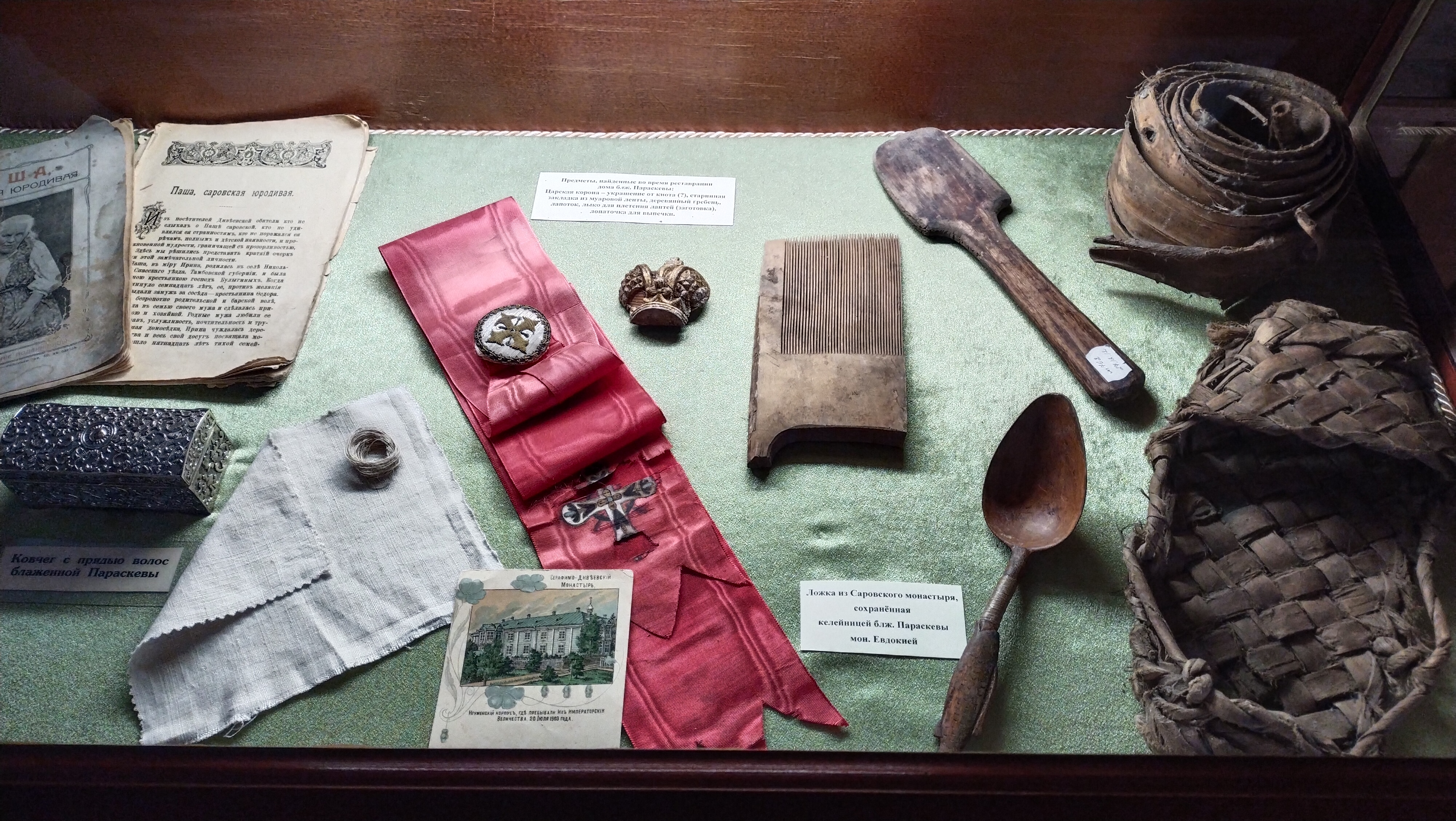
Stand with relics in the permanent exposition of the House-Museum

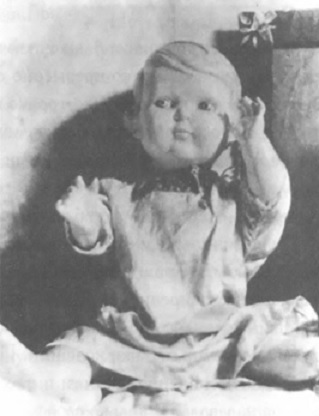
Authentic doll belonged to Paraskeva Diveyevskaya, the beginning of the 20th century

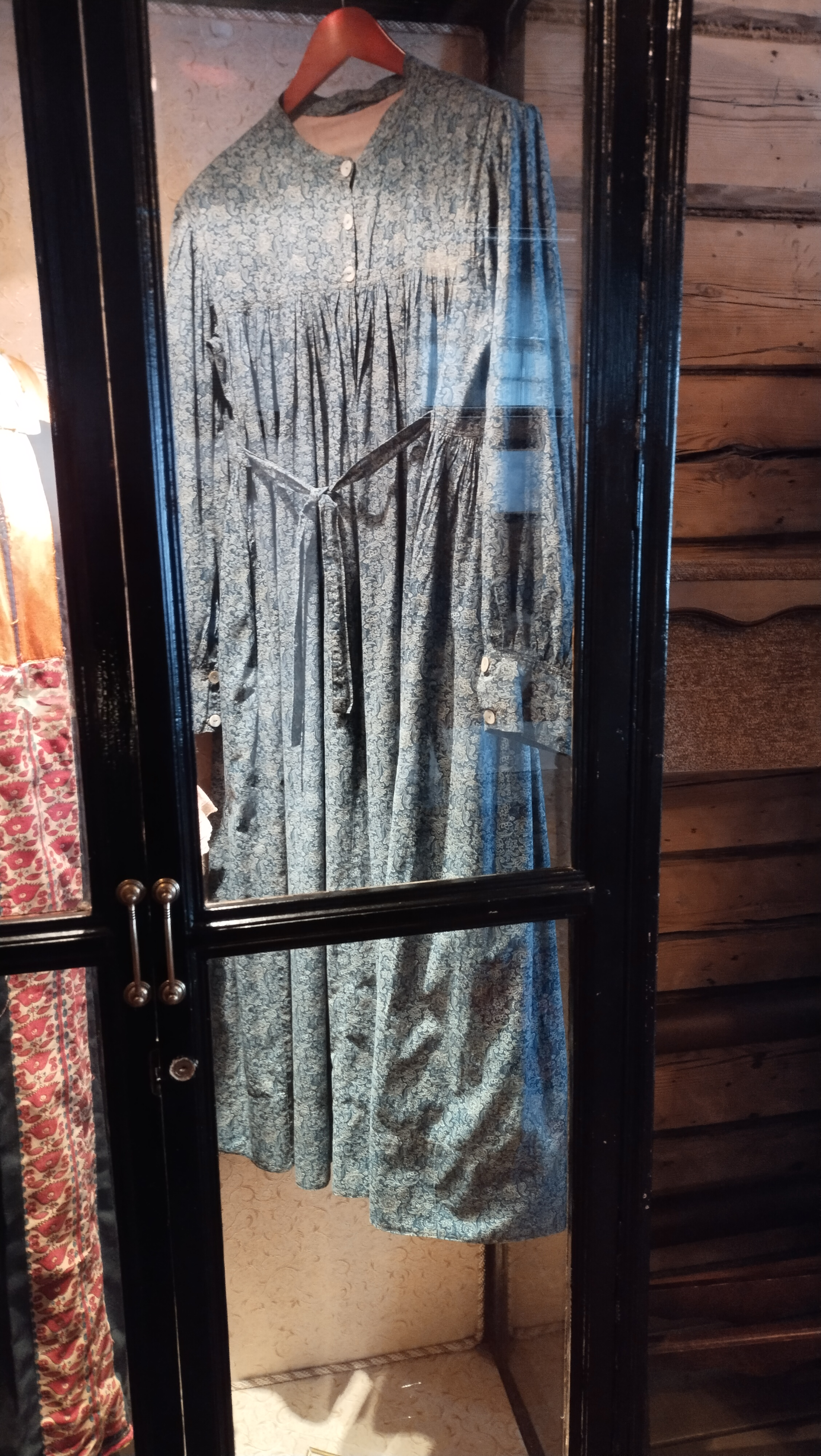
Paraskeva's blue dress

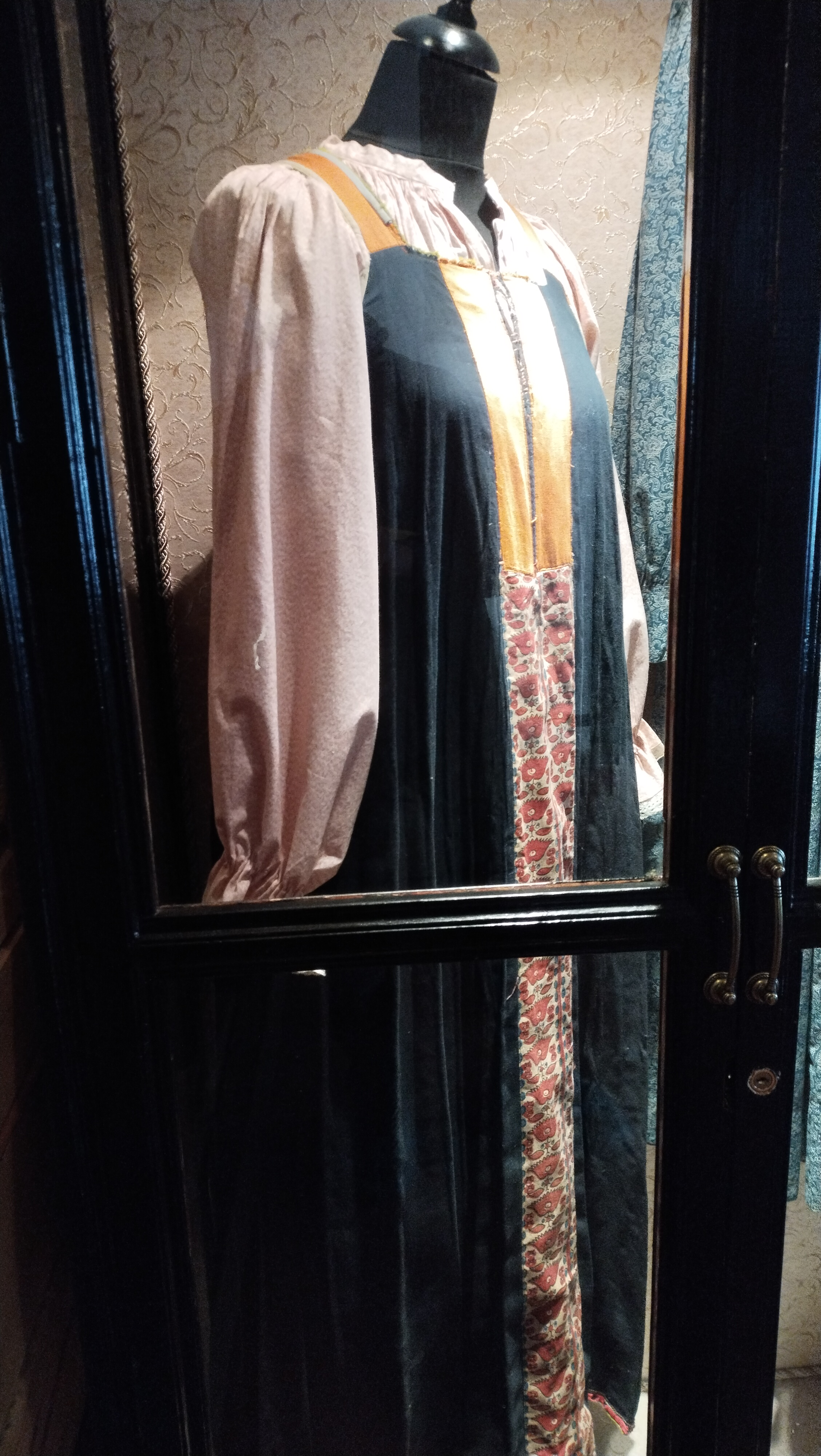
Paraskeva's pink blouse

== In culture ==
The meeting between the Emperor and the Pasha Sarovskaya was included in the text by the compilers of Anna Vyrubova's fake diary, the historian Pavel Shchegolev and the writer Alexei Tolstoy. Alexandra Feodorovna, according to the diary, perceived Pasha as a saint who endowed her with a "clear and kind face and childlike angelic eyes". Pasha blessed the "pope" and declared: "There will be a little one! Alexandra Feodorovna was blessed, but only after she had put on a colorful shawl to cover her black dress, the color of which irritated the Yurodiva. Paraskeva announced, waving a red ribbon: "There will be many, many!" The meaning of this was supposedly: "With the little one will come much blood".

Valentin Pikul presented Pasha Sarovskaya as a negative character in his novel The Unclean Power. In his novel, the Tsar and Tsarina visit Paraskeva at her cottage in 1903. During the meeting, she "showed them parts of her body that are usually hidden... met them with a rude scolding and satisfied their needs in their presence..."

The director and religious philosopher Eugene Schiffers called his last thirty-minute documentary-fiction film (there is now also a full-length one-hour version) The Czar's Way. An Investigation (1991). The film is based on the investigation of the murder of the royal family. His character is Pasha Sarovskaya. The director used puppets for many characters of the tape, including not only the royal family and the prophetess Pasha, but also their opponents — the Bolsheviks. Boris Falikov, a candidate of historical sciences, explained that the prophetess used a puppet to predict the birth of an heir to the tsarina. Throughout the film, a samaya yoga ritual is performed by the director's daughter Maria in the guise of Paraskeva Diveyevskaya. Blessed Pasha was to become, according to the director's plan, "the face of the nation, a grey-haired girl playing with dolls" in the film: On the Naming of the Patriarch, Schiffers mentioned Pasha Sarovskaya's prediction of the birth of the heir to the throne, and called the arrival of the royal family at the foolish "a beautiful, stylish act of the Russian tsars".

By the end of May and in July of 1986, there was a conception of a play or a film by Schiffer Pasha Sarovskaya's Puppets. It was to be a sketch about the staging of Boris Godunov with the help of puppets by a group of fools. The main theme was to be the murdered Tsarevich (Dimitri Uglitsky and Alexei Nikolaevich). At the same time Schiffers made notes on the Mystery Theater of the Pasha Sarovskaya.

== Bibliography ==
=== Contemporary sources ===
- Николай II. 20-го июля [1905]. Воскресение. // Дневники императора Николая II (1894—1918) [Nicholas II. July 20 [1905]. Resurrection. // Diaries of Emperor Nicholas II (1894-1918).]. Бумаги дома Романовых (in Russian). Vol. 1 (1894—1904). М.: Российская политическая энциклопедия. 2011. pp. 741–742. ISBN 978-5-8243-1602-5.
- Nilus, S. A. (2005a). Поездка в Саровскую пустынь и Серафимо-Дивеевский женский монастырь // Нилус Л. Е. Собрание сочинений в шести томах [Trip to the Sarov Desert and Diveyevo Convent // Nilus L. E. Collected Works in Six Volumes] (in Russian). Vol. 1. М.: Паломник. pp. 77–150.
- Nilus, S. (2005b). Паша, Саровская юродивая (полное жизнеописание подвижницы) [Pasha, Sarovskaya, foolish (complete biography of the ascetic) // Nilus L. E. Collected Works in Six Volumes] (in Russian). Vol. 1. М.: Паломник. pp. 515–532.Nilus, S. A. (2006). "5. Великая дивеевская блаженная Параскева Ивановна". Нилус Л. Е. Собрание сочинений в шести томах [Nilus L. E. Collected Works in six volumes] (in Russian). Vol. 4. На берегу Божьей реки. М.: Паломник. pp. 684–722. ISBN 5-8746-8138-8.
- Obolensky, L. E. (1905). Из поездки в Саров. Путевые впечатления и заметки [From Sarov's trip. Travel impressions and notes] (in Russian). Vol. V. 5 (235). Вестник Европы: Журнал. pp. 588–629.
- Паша Саровская, юродивая подвижница Серафимо-Дивеевского монастыря [Pasha Sarovskaya, foolish ascetic of the Serafimo-Diveyev Monastery] (in Russian). М.: Е. И. Коновалова. 1904. p. 36.
- Паша Саровская, юродивая: [Полное жизнеописание подвижницы] [Pasha Sarovskaya, a foolish woman: [Complete biography of the ascetic]] (in Russian). М.: Отдел. тип. И. Д. Сытина. 1904. p. 31.
- Саровская Паша, юродивая подвижница [Pasha of Sarov, a foolish ascetic] (in Russian). СПб.: Кн. торг. А. А. и Н. И. Холмушиных. 1906. p. 31.
- Seraphim (hegumen) (1916a). Блаженная Парасковия Ивановна. Паша Саровская [Blessed Paraskovia Ivanovna. Pasha Sarovskaya] (in Russian). Пермь: Типография Я. С. Гребнева: Голос долга: Журнал. pp. 13–21.
- Seraphim (hegumen) (1916b). Блаженная Парасковия Ивановна. Паша Саровская [Blessed Paraskovia Ivanovna. Pasha Sarovskaya] (in Russian). Пермь: Типография Я. С. Гребнева: Голос долга: Журнал. pp. 77–84.
- Seraphim (hegumen) (1916c). Блаженная Парасковия Ивановна. Паша Саровская [Blessed Paraskovia Ivanovna. Pasha Sarovskaya] (in Russian). Пермь: Типография Я. С. Гребнева: Голос долга: Журнал. pp. 136–144.
- Seraphim (hegumen) (1916d). Блаженная Парасковия Ивановна. Паша Саровская [Blessed Paraskovia Ivanovna. Pasha Sarovskaya] (in Russian). Пермь: Типография Я. С. Гребнева: Голос долга: Журнал. pp. 212–218.
- Seraphim (hegumen) (2006). Листки воспоминаний // Серафимо-Дивеевские предания. Житие. Воспоминания. Письма. Церковные торжества [Leaflets of Memories // Serafimo-Diveyevsky legends. Hagiography. Memories. Letters. Church celebrations] (in Russian). М.: Паломник. pp. 484–490.
- Seraphim (archimandrite) (2011). "XXXII. Жизнеописание блаженной Прасковьи Ивановны, так называемой Паши Саровской. Современное состояние Серафимо-Дивеевского монастыря". Chronicle of the Serafimo-Diveyevsky Monastery with the biography of its founders: the monk Serafim and the schema-monkess Alexandra, née A. S. Melgunova. S. Melgunova (in Russian). М.: Дивеево: Свято-Троицкий Серафимо-Дивеевский монастырь, Ковчег. pp. 872–888. ISBN 978-5-9831-7096-4.
- Seraphim (archimandrite) (2006). Записки // Серафимо-Дивеевские предания. Житие. Воспоминания. Письма. Церковные торжества [Notes // Serafimo-Diveyevsky legends. Hagiography. Memories. Letters. Church celebrations] (in Russian). М.: Паломник. pp. 566–569.
- Schneider, V. (2007). Саровские торжества. Июль 1903 года [Sarov celebrations. July 1903] (in Russian). Наше наследие: Журнал.
- Юродивая Паша в Дивеевском монастыре [Foolish Pasha in the Diveyev monastery] (in Russian). СПб.: В. Максимов. 1903. p. 16.
- "II. Юродивая Паша Саровская". Юродивая Паша Саровская, старица и подвижница Серафимо-Дивеевского женского монастыря [Foolish Pasha Sarovskaya, an old woman and ascetic of the Serafimo-Diveyevo Monastery] (in Russian). М.: Тип. И. Я. Полякова. 1904. pp. 25–36.

=== Posthumous research ===
- Bokhanov, A. N. (2011). "2. Факты и домыслы". Правда о Григории Распутине [The truth about Grigory Rasputin] (in Russian). М.: Русский издательский центр. pp. 48–83. ISBN 978-5-4249-0002-0.
- Bukova, О. V. (2005). Правда и вымыслы о жизни схиигумена Серафима по книге «Летопись Серафимо-Дивеевского монастыря» [Truth and Fictions about the Life of Seraphim the Hegumen according to the book “The Chronicle of the Seraphim-Diveyevo Monastery”] (in Russian). Благодатный огонь: Журнал.
- Grigorenko, A. Yu. (1991). Колдовство и колдуны на Руси // Сатана там правит бал. Критические очерки магии [Witchcraft and Sorcerers in Russia // Satan rules the ball there. Critical Essays on Magic] (in Russian). Киев: Украина. pp. 116–140. ISBN 5-319-00427-3.
- Grudeva, E. V. (2013). Женское юродство в Православной Церкви: история и содержание подвига [Female foolishness in the Orthodox Church: the history and content of the feat] (in Russian). М.: Православный Свято-Тихоновский гуманитарный университет. p. 102.
- Damaskin (Hieromonk) (2006a). Мученицы села Пузово // Серафимо-Дивеевские предания. Житие. Воспоминания. Письма. Церковные торжества [Martyrs of the village of Puzovo // Serafimo-Diveyevsky legends. Hagiography. Memories. Letters. Church celebrations] (in Russian). М.: Паломник. pp. 168–208.
- Damaskin (Hieromonk) (2006b). Блаженная Мария Ивановна // Серафимо-Дивеевские предания. Житие. Воспоминания. Письма. Церковные торжества [Blessed Maria Ivanovna // Serafimo-Diveyevsky legends. Hagiography. Memories. Letters. Church celebrations] (in Russian). М.: Паломник. pp. 158–167.
- Дивеевские Христа ради юродивые Пелагия, Параскева и Мария [The Diveyev fools of Christ's sake Pelagia, Paraskeva and Maria] (in Russian). Дивеево: Дивеевский монастырь. 2009. p. 171.
- Достопримечательности села Дивеева и его округи // Пять веков Дивеевской земли. XVI—XX века. Из истории населённых пунктов Дивеевского района [Sights of Diveyev village and its surroundings // Five centuries of the Diveyev land. The 16-XX century. From the history of settlements of the Diveyevsky district]. Дивеевские колокола (in Russian). Нижний Новгород: Штрих. 1998. pp. 142–158. ISBN 5-9009-1521-2.
- Iliyn, A. N. (2015). Онтология женского юродства [Female Folly Ontology] (in Russian). Вестник Вятского государственного университета: Журнал. pp. 9–12. ISSN 2541-7606.
- Kapkov, K. G. (2017). Царь и пророчества о нём // Духовный мир императора Николая II и его семьи [The Tsar and prophecies about him // The Spiritual World of Emperor Nicholas II and his family] (in Russian). М., СПб.: Летопись. pp. 235–245–157. ISBN 978-5-9904-2828-7.
- Lysenko, I. V. (2008). Благочестие императора страстотерпца Николая II как предмет исследования. Часть вторая: анализ жития императора [Piety of Emperor Nicholas II as a subject of research. Part Two: Analysis of the Emperor's hagiography] (in Russian). Христианское чтение: Журнал. pp. 81–96. ISSN 1814-5574.
- Lyashevsky, S. (2006). Дивеев монастырь в мятежные годы // Серафимо-Дивеевские предания. Житие. Воспоминания. Письма. Церковные торжества [Diveyev Monastery in the rebellious years // Serafimo-Diveyev legends. Hagiography. Memories. Letters. Church celebrations] (in Russian). М.: Паломник. pp. 447–483.
- Marchenko V., Betts R. (2010). Саров. Предсказания блаженной Паши Саровской // Духовник царской семьи. Архиепископ Феофан Полтавский, Новый Затворник (1873–1940) [Sarov. Predictions of the Blessed Pasha of Sarov // The Spiritualist of the Tsar's Family. Archbishop Theophan of Poltava, the New Hermit (1873-1940)] (in Russian). М.: Даниловский благовестник. pp. 89–93. ISBN 9-785-4572-8199-8.
- Moteyunaite, I. V. (2006). Восприятие юродства русской литературой XIX—XX веков [Perception of foolishness in Russian literature of the 19th-20th centuries] (in Russian). Псков. p. 304. ISBN 5-8514-3006-0.
- Moteyunaite, I. V. (2008). Юродство, любовь и материнство в пьесе Л. Улицкой «Семеро святых» [Foolishness, love and motherhood in L. Ulitskaya's play “Seven Saints”] (in Russian). Проблемы исторической поэтики: Журнал. pp. 594–605. ISSN 1026-9479.
- Pavlovich, G. (2015). Паша Саровская. Новые архивные материалы к житию блаженной Параскевы Дивеевской [Pasha Sarovskaya. New archival materials to the life of Blessed Paraskeva of Diveyevo] (PDF) (in Russian). Журнал Московской патриархии: Журнал. pp. 28–35.
- По поводу статьи О.Буковой «Правда и вымыслы о жизни схиигумена Серафима». От редакции [Regarding O. Bukova's article “Truth and Fictions about the Life of St. Seraphim”. From the editors] (in Russian). Благодатный огонь: Журнал. 2006.
- Ryabinin, Yu. V. (2021). Истинная раба Божия Параскева Дивеевская (Паша Саровская) // Русь юродская. История русского юродства в лицах и сценах [The True Servant of God Paraskeva of Diveyev (Pasha Sarovskaya) // Foolish Russia. History of Russian foolishness in faces and scenes] (in Russian). М.: Рипол-Классик. p. 161. ISBN 978-5-3861-4387-9.
- Seraphima (nun) (2006). Дивеевские предания // Серафимо-Дивеевские предания. Житие. Воспоминания. Письма. Церковные торжества [Diveyevo legends // Serafimo-Diveyevo legends. Hagiography. Memories. Letters. Church celebrations] (in Russian). М.: Паломник. pp. 76–157.
- Timofeyevich, А. P. (2006). В Дивееве летом 1926 года // Серафимо-Дивеевские предания. Житие. Воспоминания. Письма. Церковные торжества [In Diveyev in the summer of 1926 // Serafimo-Diveyevskie lore. Hagiography. Memories. Letters. Church celebrations] (in Russian). М.: Паломник. pp. 522–541.
- Falikov, B. Z. (2018). Миф Шифферса [The Schiffer's Myth] (in Russian). Театр: Журнал.
- Theophan (archimandrite) (2017). С чистым взором ребёнка она молилась за нас, грешных. О блаженной Параскеве Дивеевской // Неблаженные блаженные святые. Рассказы о необыкновенных подвижниках [With the pure gaze of a child, she prayed for us sinners. About Blessed Paraskeva Diveyevskaya // Blessed Saints. Stories about extraordinary ascetics]. Книги о святых и верующих (in Russian). М.: АСТ. pp. 156–165. ISBN 978-5-1709-9451-9.
- Firsov, S. L. (2010). Николай II. Пленник самодержавия [Nicholas II. Autocracy's Prisoner]. Жизнь замечательных людей (in Russian). М.: Молодая гвардия. pp. 85–93. ISBN 978-5-2350-3382-5.
- Хронология жизни и творчества Е. Л. Шифферса // Религиозно-философские произведения [E. L. Schifferes' Life and Work Chronology // Religious and Philosophical Works]. Наследие Евгения Шифферса (in Russian). М.: Русский институт. 2005. p. 608. ISBN 5-98379-041-2.
- Shiffers, E. L. (2005). Лама: О наречении патриарха // Религиозно-философские произведения [Lama: On the Naming of the Patriarch // Religious and Philosophical Works]. Наследие Евгения Шифферса (in Russian). М.: Русский институт. p. 608. ISBN 5-9837-9041-2.

=== Fiction and journalism ===
- Pikul, V. S. (1991). "12. Чудо без чудес". Нечистая сила [An evil force] (in Russian). М.: АСКИ, Раритет. pp. 85–93.
