= Viktor Obninsky =

Viktor Petrovich Obninsky (Russian: Ви́ктор Петро́вич Обни́нский, 1867–1916) was a political essayist of Polish descent who became a well-known figure in Russian public and political life, at the beginning of the 1900s.

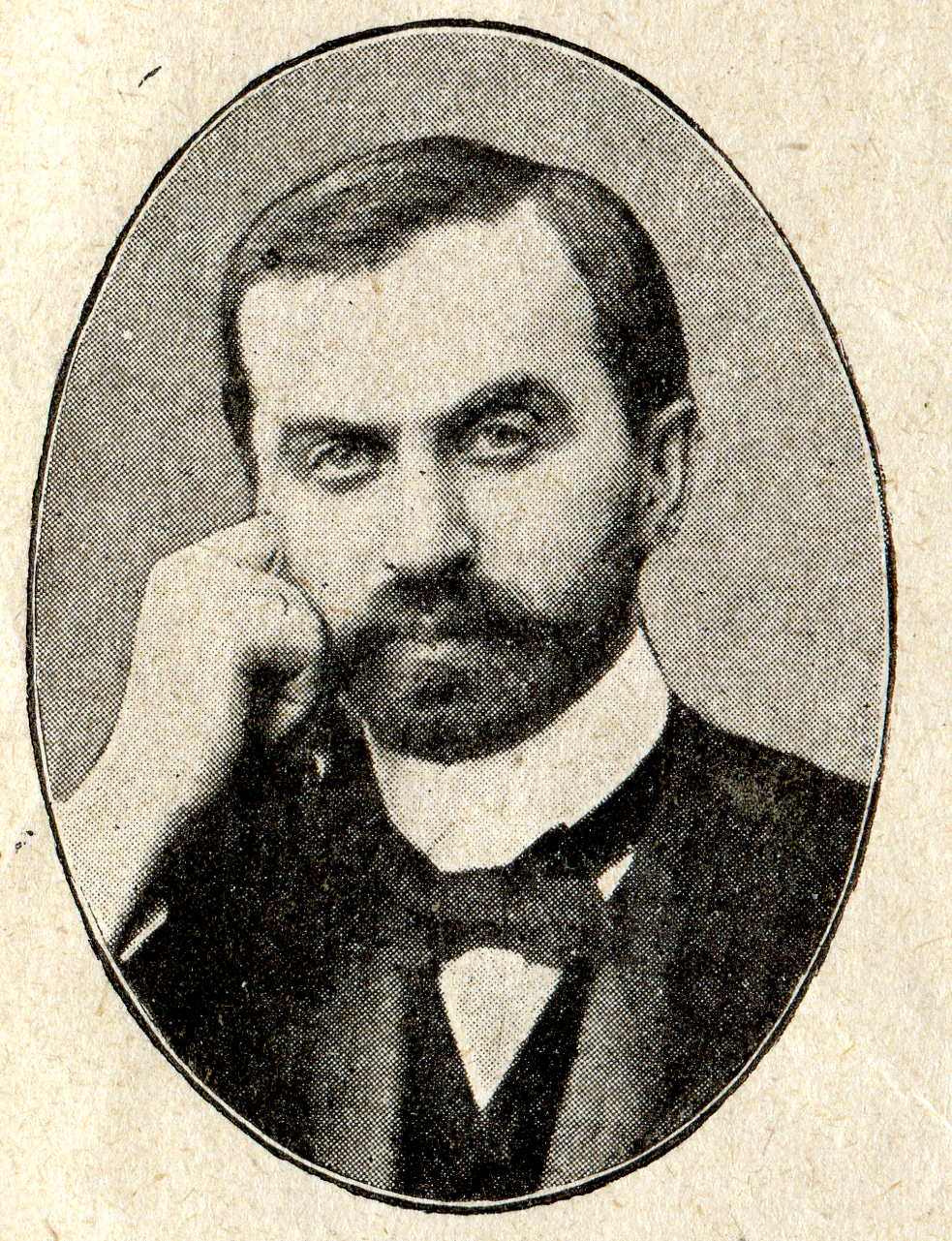
Obninsky in 1906

== Biography ==
Obninsky was a district Marshal of Nobility and Chairman of the Kaluga municipal council, and in 1906 was elected to the 1st State Duma (the Russian Parliament) from the Constitutional Democratic Party, known by their party's initials as the KaDety or 'Cadets'.

Obninsky's reputation was that of a man of rare virtues and a progressive politician, "a dedicated federalist and proponent of sweeping national self-determination".

In 1908, as one of those who drafted the Vyborg proclamation against the dissolution of the Duma, Obninsky was sentenced to three months in prison.

After his imprisonment Obninsky could no longer continue as a public servant, he remained active, and during World War I contributed his considerable efforts to organizing relief for Russian prisoners of war in Germany and Austria. His many interests included the arts: he was among the founders of the "Free Aesthetics" society, whose goal was to unite the Russian artistic intelligentsia. Serov, who was also a participant in "Free Aesthetics", often saw Obninsky at the society's meetings between 1908 and 1911.

== Personal life ==
Obninsky married Cleopatra Obninskaya (nee Salova, 1880–1928) in 1901. They settled in Lzi, a large estate in the Novgorod province that was part of her dowry.

In 1902 Obninsky and his wife moved to his father's country estate at Belkino, the family's ancestral home since 1840. Upon receiving the land that constituted his share of the inheritance, Obninsky invested some of his wife's capital in building a small but architecturally noteworthy manor that they called Turliki, and Cleopatra became the lady of the house.

== Death ==
On March 21, 1916, at the age of 49, Obninsky shot himself. The note he left for publication in newspapers stated that the only reason for his suicide was disappointment in politics. Eventually his contemporaries learned otherwise: it seemed that his fatal decision was the result of a "tragic romantic love" after having fallen for the young Countess Vera Urusova, but his feelings were unreciprocated.
