= Gusev (surname) =

Gusev (Russian: Гусев), or Guseva (feminine; Гусева), is a Russian surname derived from the word гусь (goos, meaning "goose"). Husyev/Husiev and Husyeva/Husieva are Ukrainian adaptations of the name.

Notable people with the surname include:

- Anna Guseva
- Aleksandr Gusev (field hockey) (1955–1994), field hockey player from the Soviet Union
- Alexander Gusev (ice hockey) (1947–2020), Soviet ice hockey player and Olympic champion
- Alexandr Vladimirovich Gussev or Gusev (1917–1999), Russian parasitologist, specialist of monogeneans
- Aleksandr Gusev (politician) (born 1963), Russian politician and governor of Voronezh Oblast
- Alexander Gusev (scientist), statistical geneticist with an interest in human genetics and oncogenomics
- Aleksandr Gusev (field hockey) (1955–1994), former field hockey player from the Soviet Union
- Aleksandr Gusev (ice hockey) (1947–2020), former Soviet ice hockey player and Olympic champion
- Alexandr Vladimirovich Gussev or Gusev (1917–1999), Russian parasitologist, specialist of monogeneans
- Andrei Gusev (born 1952), Russian writer and journalist
- Dmitry Sergeyevich Gusev (1915–1987), Soviet army officer
- Dmitry Gusev (born 1972), Russian politician
- Eduard Gusev (1936–2016), Soviet cyclist
- Ekaterina Guseva, see Yekaterina Guseva (born 1976), Russian actress and singer
- Elena Guseva, Russian operatic soprano
- Elina Guseva, Azerbaijani handball player
- Khioniya Guseva, Russian woman famous for attempting to murder Grigori Rasputin
- Klara Guseva (1937–2019), former Soviet speed skater
- Marina Guseva
- Matvey Gusev (1826–1866), Russian astronomer
- Natalya Guseva (born 1972), Russian actress
- Natalya Romanovna Guseva, Russian ethnographer and indologist
- Natalia Vladimirovna Guseva (born 1982), Russian biathlete
- Nataliya Guseva (born 2003), Russian golfer
- Nikita Gusev (born 1992), Russian ice hockey player
- Nikolai Gusev (1897–1962), Soviet general
- Nina Guseva (born 1988), Russian actress and documentary filmmaker
- Oleg Andreyevich Gusev (born 1964), Russian entrepreneur
- Oxana Guseva
- Pavel Gusev (journalist) (born 1949), Russian journalist
- Pavel Gusev (footballer) (born 1953), Russian football player and coach
- Pyotr Gusev
  - Pyotr Gusev (1904–1987), Soviet ballet dancer, choreographer and teacher
  - Pyotr Gusev (soldier) (1932–2024), Soviet general
- Rolan Gusev (born 1977), Russian footballer
- Sergei Gusev (born 1975), Russian ice hockey player
- Sergey Gusev (swimmer)
- Sergey Ivanovich Gusev (1874–1933), Russian/Soviet statesman and politician
- Tamara Guseva
- Vladimir Gusev (cyclist) (born 1982), Russian road racing cyclist
- Vladimir Gusev (ice hockey) (born 1982), Russian ice hockey player
- Vladimir Gusev (politician) (born 1932), Soviet and Russian politician
- Vladimir Gusev (runner) (born 1961), Kazakhstani long-distance runner and participant at the 1997 IAAF World Half Marathon Championships
- Viktor Mikhaylovich Gusev (1909–1944), Soviet songwriter, playwright and screenwriter
- Viktor Mikhaylovich Gusev (born 1955), Russian sports commentator
- Yekaterina Guseva (born 1976), popular Russian actress

== Fictional characters ==
- Aleksei Gusev, one of the two spacefarers in the 1923 Russian science fiction novel Aelita
- The protagonist of "Gusev" (short story) (1890) by Anton Chekhov

== See also ==
- Lidiya Gusheva, Bulgarian long jumper
