= Hermogenes Dolganyov =

Russian bishop and saint (1858–1918)

Saint Hermogenes Dolganyov
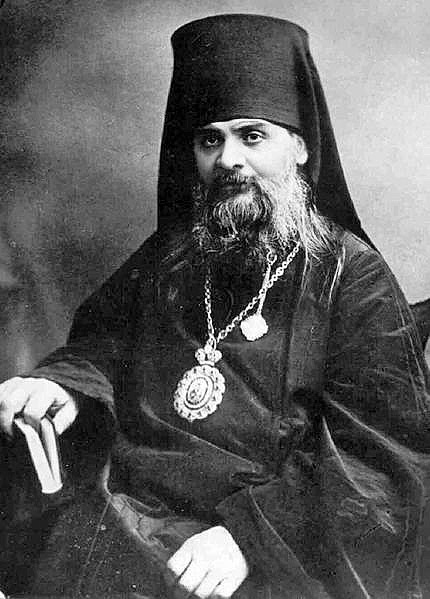
- Undated photo of Dolganyov

Bishop of Tobolsk and Siberia, Martyr
- Born: Georgiy Yefremovich Dolganyov; April 25, 1858; Kherson Governorate
- Died: April 1918 (aged 59–60); Tura River
- Honored in: Eastern Orthodox Church
- Canonized: 31 March 1999

Georgiy Yefremovich Dolganyov (Гео́ргий Ефре́мович Долганёв; 25 April 1858 – April 1918) was a prominent Russian Orthodox religious figure, a monarchist and anti-communist, who supported the Union of the Russian People and Black Hundreds. In 1917, he was appointed as Hermogenes, Bishop of Tobolsk and Siberia (Russian: священному́ченик Гермоге́н, епи́скоп Тобо́льский и Сиби́рский). In April 1918, he was arrested by Bolsheviks and drowned in the Tura River. He was canonized on 31 March 1999 being regarded as a martyred saint.

== Life ==
Georgiy, the son of a priest, went to school in Ananiv, a city (near Odessa) where half of the population was Jewish. He studied law, mathematics and philology at Novorossiysk University. (Because of his high-pitched voice, it was believed Hermogenes had castrated himself in 1890, influenced by the ideas of the Skoptsy). Influenced by Nicanor, Bishop of Kherson, he chose the Orthodox ministry. Following his education in Saint Petersburg Theological Seminary in 1892, Dolganyov accepted the name Hermogenes. In 1893 he became the inspector of the Tiflis Theological Seminary in Tbilisi, and in 1898 became its dean. In 1899, Hermogenes was responsible for expelling one of seminary's most famous students, Joseph Dzhugashvili (Joseph Stalin), who had been reading Ninety-Three (a book on the French Revolution by Victor Hugo) and lecturing students on Marxism. In 1903 he became the Bishop of Saratov and Tsaritsyn and had a seat in the Holy Synod. In the church he introduced singing by the people, promoted processions, founded schools, and started mission work. Hermogenes founded the Annunciation Convent and Saint Trinity Monastery in Khvalynsk, in Volsk the Town Church of Annunciation.

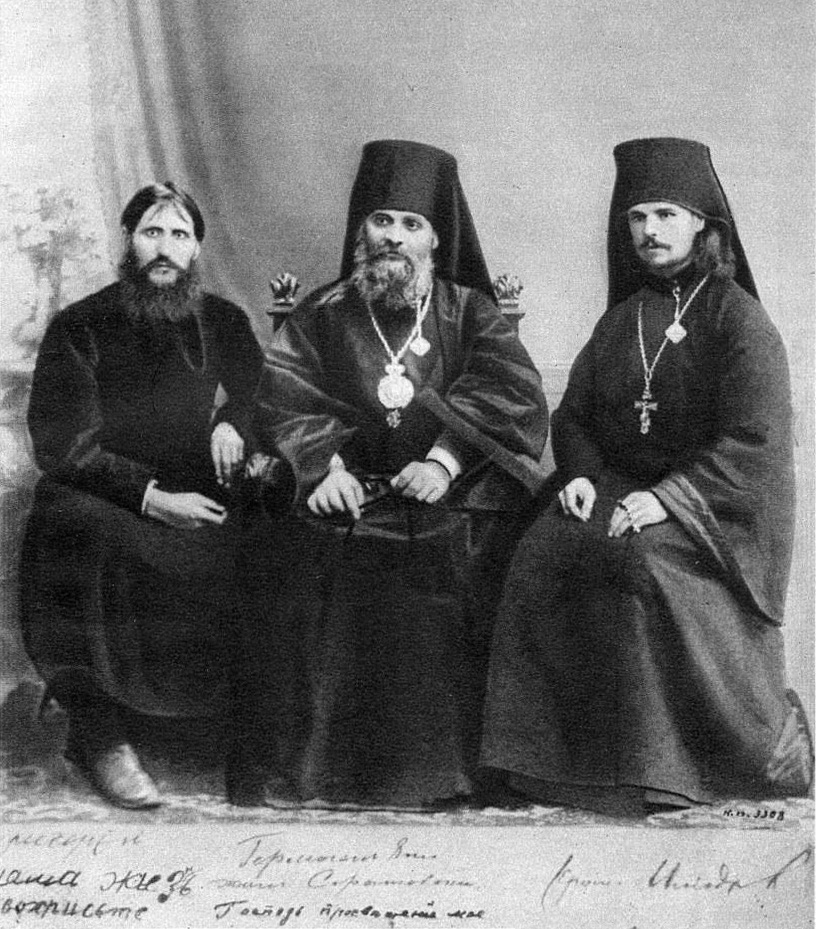
Rasputin, Hermogenes and Iliodor next to each other in 1906. Alexandra ordered Hermogenes banished to a monastery after beating Rasputin with a crucifix; Iliodor went into exile after the attack by Khioniya Guseva in June 1914.

In 1905, Hermogenes, probably the most widely respected figure in the Russian Orthodox Church, became a friend of Grigori Rasputin from the time he arrived in the capital. Rasputin stayed at Alexander Nevsky Lavra; there he met with Hermogenes and Theophanes of Poltava, who were amazed with his psychological perspicacity. For a time, Bishop Hermogenes and Rasputin became allies in the struggle against freethinking and modernism. His rhetoric was so outrageous that local officials suppressed the newspaper of his diocese. In 1909, Rasputin visited Hermogenes in Saratov and Iliodor in Tsaritsyn. Within two years the three men became bitter enemies.

In December 1911, Hermogenes and Iliodor came into conflict with Rasputin, who chose a different strategy and had almost free access to the Imperial family. Hermogenes started rumours that Rasputin had joined the Khlysty, an obscure Christian sect with strong Siberian roots. After having been beaten by Hermogenes, in a monastery on Vasilyevsky Island, Rasputin complained to the Imperial couple. Within a few weeks and without a trial, Hermogenes and his assistant Mitya Kozelsky, a holy fool, were expelled to the Zhyrovichy Monastery.

From August 1915 he lived in Ugresha Monastery. In 1917 he was appointed as Archbishop of Tobolsk and Siberia. He established contacts with the Imperial Family in Ekaterinburg.

In April 1918, Hermogenes was arrested by a group of Bolsheviks. In of June 1918, the bishop and several other prisoners (the priest of the village of Kamenskoye of the Yekaterinburg diocese, Pyotr Karelin, the former gendarme non-commissioned officer Nikolai Knyazev, the gymnasium student Mstislav Golubev, the former police chief of Yekaterinburg Genrikh Rushinsky and the officer Ershov) were taken to Tyumen and Ershov. All of the prisoners, except for the bishop and father Peter, were shot on the shore near the village of Pokrovskoye. At first they were forced to work on the construction of fortifications near Pokrovskoe, then they were transferred to the steamer Oka, which was headed for Tobolsk. On the way, the priests were drowned on orders of the Baltic sailor and Bolshevik leader Pavel Khokhryakov in the Tura River, not far from the birthplace of his nemesis Rasputin. His body was found on 3 July and buried in a nearby village, later reburied in the Sophia cathedral of Tobolsk.

== Sources ==
- Fuhrmann, Joseph T. (2013). Rasputin, the untold story (illustrated ed.). Hoboken, New Jersey: John Wiley & Sons, Inc. p. 314. ISBN 978-1-118-17276-6.
