= Gusev =

Gusev (masculine) or Guseva (feminine) may refer to:

- Gusev (surname) (Guseva), Russian surname
- Gusev (inhabited locality) (or Guseva), several inhabited localities in Russia
- Gusev crater (Russia), impact crater in Rostov Oblast, Russia
- Gusev (Martian crater)
- "Gusev" (short story), an 1890 short story by Anton Chekhov
