= Mitya Kozelsky =

Russian fool for Christ

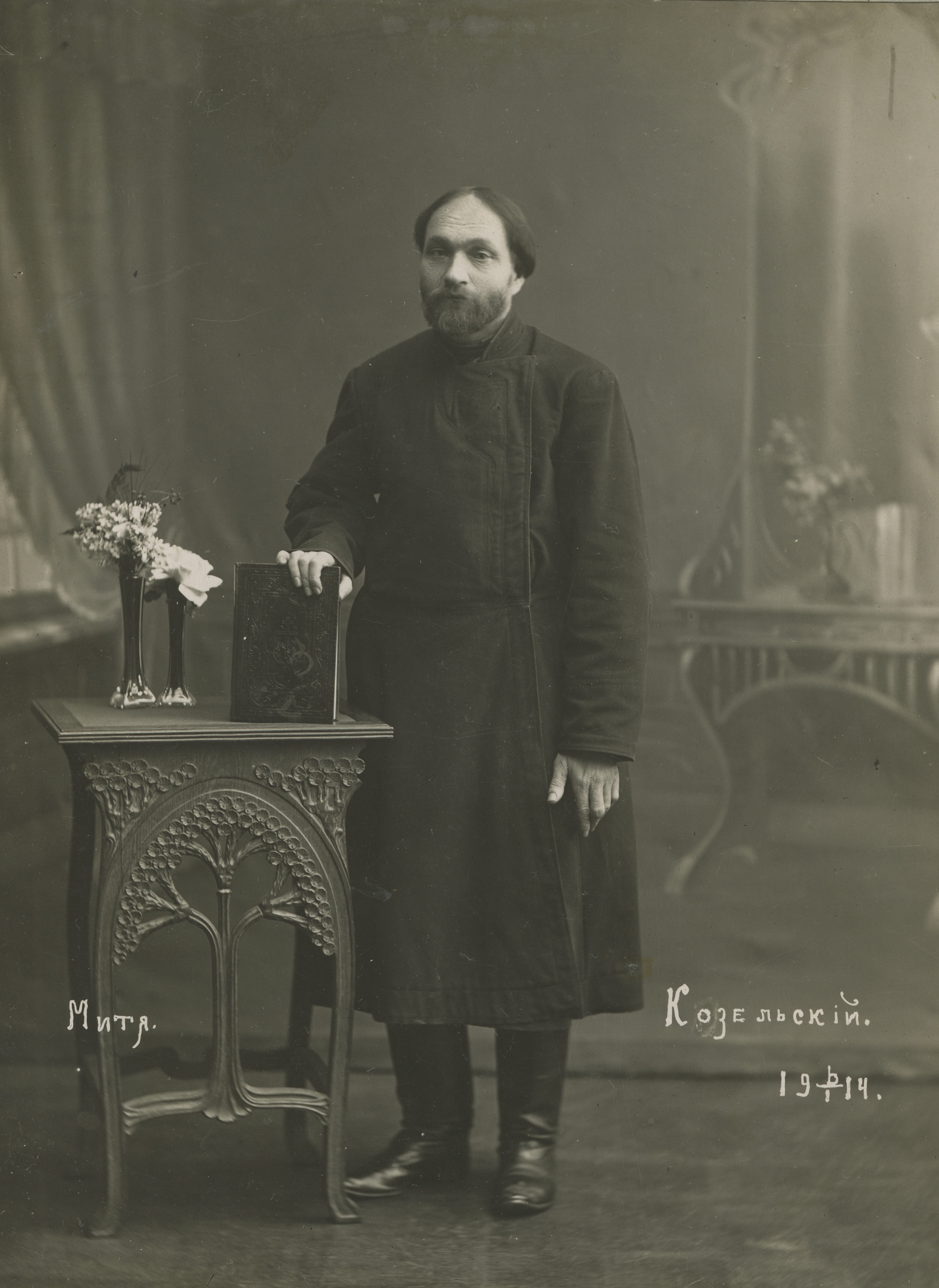
- Unknown Russian photographer of the early 20th century. Mitya Kozelsky, 1914
- Born: Dmitriy (Dmitrievich?) Popov; 1865; Kozelsk, Kaluga Governorate, Russian Empire
- Died: 1929 (aged 63–64); Solovetsky Islands, Soviet Union
- Occupation: Fooli for Christ
- Children: An unknown student from the Smolny Institute.

Mitya Kozelsky (Russian: Митя Козельский, also known as Mitya Koliaba, Mitya Gugnivy, Mitya Kolebiaka; real name Dmitry Popov; 1865, Kozelsk, Kaluga Governorate, Russian Empire – 1929, Solovetsky Islands, USSR) was a Russian Fool for Christ, who enjoyed the favor and trust of Emperor Nicholas II and Empress Alexandra Feodorovna. He suffered from epilepsy and severe damage to his musculoskeletal system, struggling to articulate speech (often appearing with an "interpreter" who helped him to clarify his words).

After being distanced from the imperial court, he became a fierce opponent of Grigory Rasputin. On 29 December 1911, he participated in an unsuccessful attempt by senior clergy to force Rasputin's departure from Saint Petersburg and end his contact with the imperial family. Following this, he was forced into hiding. He maintained close ties with the Churikov movement.

His reputation of a holy person is reflected in the contemporaries' memoirs, including French ambassador Maurice Paléologue, Chairman of the Council of Ministers Vladimir Kokovtsov, Chairman of the State Duma Mikhail Rodzianko, and many others. Mitya Kozelsky became a minor character in Valentin Pikul's novel the Demonic Forces, and Andrey Amalrik's documentary novel Rasputin.

== Biography ==
=== Before coming to the court ===
Dmitry Popov was born in 1865, (Note: Andrey Tereshchuk attributed Mitya Kozelsky's thirtieth birthday to 1900, so the date of his birth should be 1870.) (Note: Sergei Firsov claimed that by 1900 he was about 45 years old, so the date of birth of Mitya Kozelsky he considered not 1865, but about 1855.) in the town of Kozelsk in Kaluga Governorate. Former hieromonk Iliodor, who knew him closely, wrote that Popov belonged to the burgher class. (Note: The authors of the collective work of the staff of V. M. Shukshin Biysk Pedagogical State University considered him a peasant.) Iliodor claimed that by 1900, Dmitry Popov was mute and completely crippled. Doctor of Philosophical Sciences Andrey Grigorenko described him at this time as "deaf, mute, half-blind, bow-legged, with a crooked spine and two stumps instead of arms". According to Grigorenko, "his brain, atrophied like his limbs, held only a small number of rudimentary ideas, which he expressed through guttural sounds, stuttering, grunting, mooing, squealing, and chaotic gestures with his stumps". (Note: Exactly this characterization of Mitya is given in the memoirs of the French ambassador Maurice Paleologue, but not in relation to the childhood and youth of the fool, but in relation to the time of his acquaintance with the emperor. Peasants from his native village gave him alms out of compassion and saw nothing divine in him.)

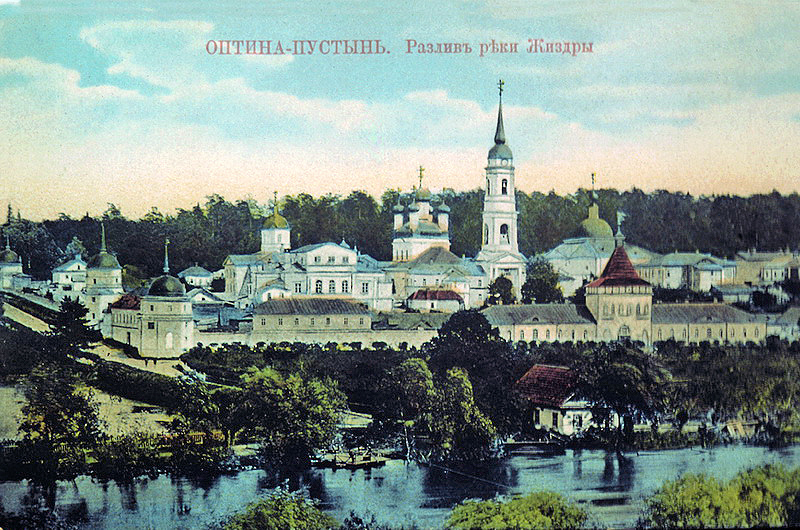
Optina Pustyn on a colored postcard from 1909

For several years, Dmitry Popov lived at Optina Pustyn, near Kozelsk. In 1900, contemporaries believed that after a thunder storm he started to walk and speak intelligibly. However, significant health issues persisted. Recounting events from 1911, Iliodor wrote: Mitya "stamped his lame foot and gestured wildly with his healthy hand". (Note: Dr. Vadim Telitsyn, a doctor of historical sciences, claimed that during his stay at the court (i.e., after 1901), the jester had crooked legs, a hump, stumps instead of hands, poor eyesight and hearing, so he had to be "guided by the stump".) In 1900, it was considered miraculous that "a cross appeared in his right hand". It was believed that Mitya Kozelsky gained the ability to exorcise demons, and his words began to be perceived as prophecy. Iliodor added that the miracles he performed were mediated by that very cross. Maurice Paloologue noted that his prophetic ecstasy appeared as alternating "agitation with intervals of stupor".

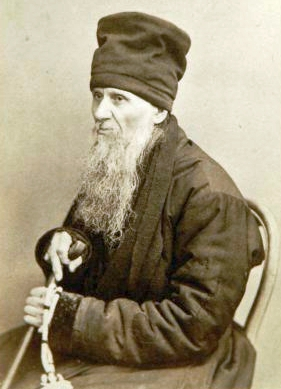
Amvrosy Optinsky in the 1870s

According to Viktor Obninsky, a deputy of the First State Duma from Kaluga Governorate, after the death of Amvrosy Optinsky in 1891, the Optina Pustyn status got weak. The monks needed a new veneration figure. Obninsky believed they viewed Mitya Kozelsky as Amvrosy's successor. Pilgrims visiting the monastery spread the "fame of the new blessed one" across Russia. The indistinctness of Mitya's speech and the vague interpretations of his words allowed people to attribute "all the more meaning and significance to them, the more senseless they were". Candidate of Historical Sciences Ilya Solovyov considered Mitya Kozelsky a protégé of Amvrosy himself, who welcomed cripples. Doctor of Historical Sciences, Professor Vadim Telitsyn wrote that the monks of Optina Pustyn "discovered his miraculous abilities". Candidate of Historical Sciences Vladimir Novikov agreed, stating that "during one of his epileptic fits, a monk at Optina Pustyn concluded that Mitya Kolebyaka possessed a prophetic gift". Afterwards, monks began presenting Mitya to church authorities, who, according to Novikov, started to use him" for their own purposes.

From Optina Pustyn, Mitya Kozelsky embarked on a wandering journey across the Russian Empire. Memoirist and journalist Alexander Voznesensky, claimed that his frequent companion on these wanderings was Grigory Rasputin. In 1901, Mitya arrived in Kronstadt, where he was introduced to the widely known John of Kronstadt.

Initially, Mitya established a friendly relationship with John of Kronstadt, but they got a quarrel soon. The cause was that John didn't inform the tsar about Mitya's prophetic gift. Later, when Mitya got to the imperial court, he demanded that John appear before the emperor to explain himself. The emperor, in Mitya's presence, asked John: "Why didn’t you tell me at the time that the prescient Mitya had come to Kronstadt and asked you to inform me?" John could not respond and was visibly shaken. According to Iliodor, Mitya Kozelsky was the first to denounce John of Kronstadt, recounting that "between Lomonosov and Kronstadt, some people caught him, beat him for improper relations with women; they brought Ivan home unconscious, requiring two sheets for the blood".

=== Mitya Kozelsky among the Imperial Family ===
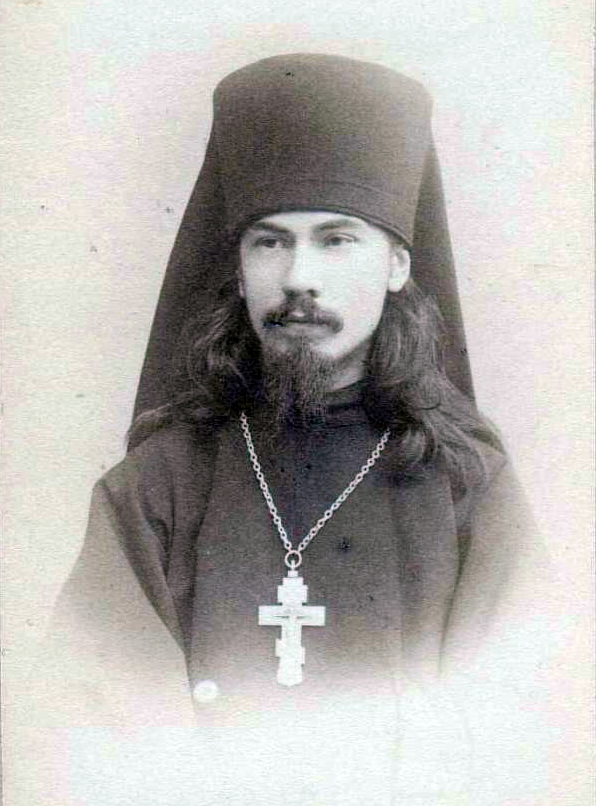
Archimandrite Theophan (Bystrov), who introduced Mitya to the court, between 1898 and 1901

According to hieromonk Iliodor, John of Kronstadt helped Mitya Kozelsky gain an audience at the Saint Petersburg Theological Academy with theology candidate Archimandrite Theophan, the academy's inspector (Iliodor noted he personally introduced Mitya to Theophan, dating this to 1902). Theophan then introduced him to Princess Milica Nikolaevna, wife of Grand Duke Peter Nikolaevich, and later to Emperor Nicholas II. Doctor of Historical-Philological Sciences and academician of the Russian Academy of Sciences Mikhail Bogoslovsky viewed Mitya Kozelsky as a protégé of Bishop of Saratov and Tsaritsyn Hermogenes, contrasting him with Rasputin, a protégé of Archimandrite Theophan.

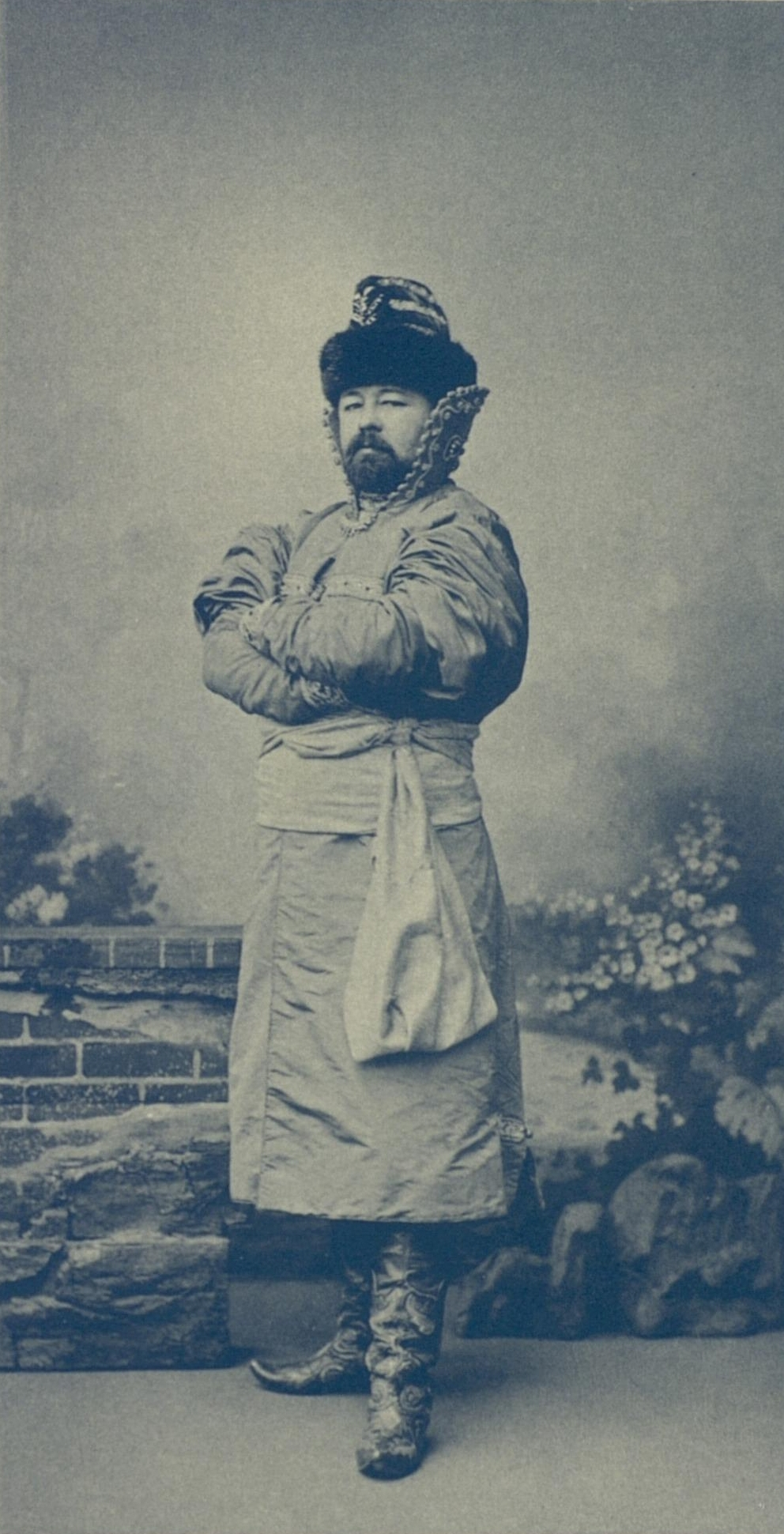
Aleksey Obolensky at the 1903 masquerade ball

Viktor Obninsky offered a different version of Mitya's introduction to the court. He claimed that Kozelsk landowner and aide-de-camp Prince Nikolay Obolensky, Grand Duke Konstantin, who lived for years at a dacha near Optina Pustyn, and Nikolay's brother Aleksey, briefly the Ober-Procurator of the Holy Synod, drew the tsar's attention to him. Vadim Telitsyn added that Mitya healed Princess Abamelek-Lazareva of infertility, which caught Obolensky's interest. Initially, the fool was received in the salon of Countess Sofya Ignatieva, after which several salon members "decided to bring the holy madman to the imperial court" to aid the empress in bearing an heir. Doctor of Philosophy Douglas Smith wrote that a senior official noticed Mitya Kozelsky and brought him to court from Optina Pustyn.

Typically, Mitya Kozelsky arrived to high society with an elderly "interpreter" who deciphered his intentions for those present, as he continued to struggle with speech. Some sources identify that man as Yelpidifor Kananykin, Mitya's fellow native from Kozelsk, a burgher, and former merchant. (Note: Andrei Tereshchuk and Vadim Telitsyn in their books give the same name, but a different biography of the “interpreter”. According to them, he was a rector (or psalmist) in the village of Goevo. Another version in his book on Rasputin was expounded by Brian Moynehen. He claimed that the interpreter and interpreter at Mita was a certain prikomar Egorov, who, praying before the icon of Nicholas the Wonderworker, received the gift “to discern the divine meaning in the howls and squeals of Mita”. Vadim Telitsyn also mentioned a prayer at an image of Nicholas the Wonderworker, but attributed the event to Kananykin. During the prayer, the voice of the saint announced to Elpidifor that the foolish Mitya Kolyaba would play a great role in Russian history, and revealed the key to his “divination”. Ilya Solovyov gives the surname of the “interpreter” as Kanonikin and considers him a landlord from Kozelsk.) Journalist and memoirist Lev Klyachko ironically dubbed him Mitya's impresario. Kananykin explained that, "having grasped the vanity of life, he decided to dedicate himself to the blessed one, after which… divine favor descended upon him, enabling him to understand Mitka and comprehend the hidden meaning of his words". Yelpidifor Kananykin often begged for generous donations to build a church in Optina Pustyn in honor of the blessed one. When Dmitry Trepov became palace commandant, Lev Klyachko claimed he housed Mitya and Yelpidifor in his apartments and personally escorted them to meetings with the tsar.

Viktor Obninsky described the first meeting between Mitya and the emperor this way: the fool and his interpreter were bathed and decently dressed beforehand. Upon seeing the emperor, Mitya moaned, which Yelpidifor interpreted as a desire to see the children. After the daughters appeared, "the fool shrieked wildly and showed some excitement", which Yelpidifor explained as a wish to drink tea. Mitya "was kept at the palace for a while and then sent back home". Some time later, he was "summoned again for certain actions." According to Obninsky, this was the fool's final visit to the court. This version was retold by Candidate of Historical Sciences Aleksandr Gorbovsky and writer Yulian Semyonov in their book Closed Pages of History, as well as by Doctor of Philosophical Sciences Vyacheslav Vozchikov, Candidate of Historical Sciences and rector of Biysk State Pedagogical University Konstantin Koltakov, and writer and local historian Yury Kozlov in Bonfire for the Holy Devil: A Historical-Literary Study.

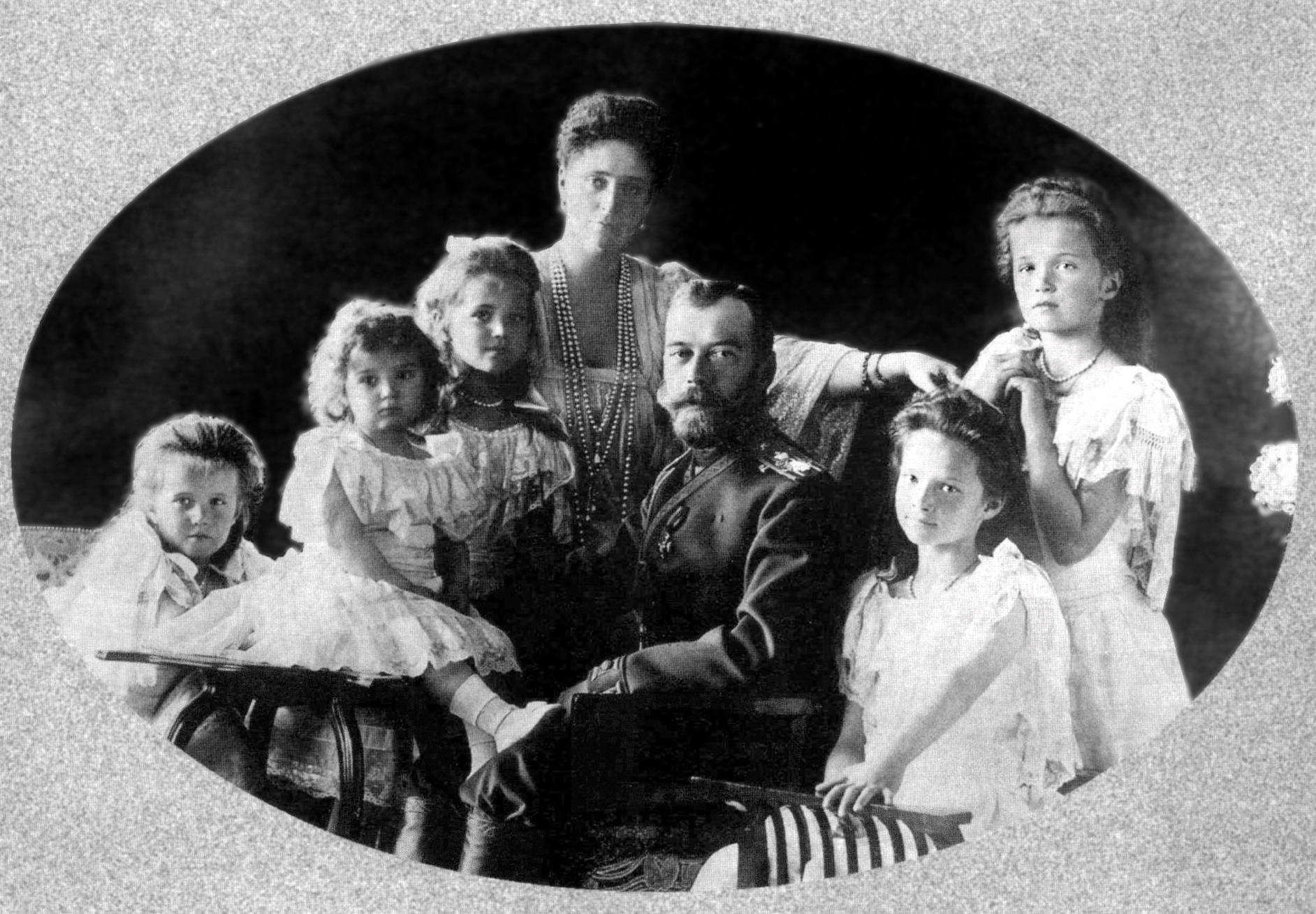
The imperial family in 1906

Lev Klyachko described the fool's visits to the imperial family differently: Yelpidifor Kananykin, "anticipating an impending fit, led him into the tsar's chambers. There, Mitya rolled on the floor, spewing copious saliva and incoherent sounds. The tsar and tsarina watched the fits intently and listened to Kananykin translate the fool's prophecies into comprehensible language". Vadim Telitsyn wrote of numerous visits to Tsarskoye Selo and the empress's severe headaches from the fool's screams. Kananykin refused to interpret Mitya's words regarding the birth of an heir, offering evasive comments. According to the historian, the fool never achieved the influence at court held by other "predictors" and "miracle-workers".

Former hieromonk Iliodor, in his 1917 book Holy Devil: Notes on Rasputin, described Mitya's role at court: "The little blessed one gave the tsars advice, warned of revolution, military uprisings, and, sneaking in through the back door, waving his withered hand, limping slightly on his left or right leg, and casually carrying bilberries or strawberries in his pockets for the tsar's children, he prophesied". Maurice Paléologue, emphasizing Mitya's influence at the time, stated: "During the unfortunate Russo-Japanese War, Mitya Kolyaba seemed destined to play a major role. But clumsy friends entangled him in an epic quarrel between Rasputin and Bishop Hermogenes". Candidate of Historical Sciences Voldemar Balyazin claimed that the intimate use of papa and mama by the Romanovs and their close circle for the emperor and empress stemmed from Mitya Kozelsky, as these were the only two words he could pronounce clearly.

In Nicholas II's diary entry for January 27, 1906 (January 14, Old Style), (Note: In the 19th century the difference in the calculation of the Julian and Gregorian calendars was 12 days. In the 20th century the difference is 13 days.) it is written: "At 4 o’clock, a man of God, Dmitry from Kozelsk near Optina Pustyn, came to us. He brought an icon painted according to a vision he recently had. We spoke with him for about an hour and a half". In her dissertation for the degree of Candidate of Art History, Ksenia Alexandrova argued that this refers to the same icon mentioned in a description of Nicholas II's Portrait Hall. On the icon, the emperor and his wife stand "surrounded by angels, while below, the heavenly host strikes demons with fiery swords".

Doctor of Historical Sciences Aleksandr Bokhanov suggested that a 21st-century person should set aside modern perspectives to see in the emperor's interactions with an ignorant fool "spiritual joy, the celebration that contact with the Divine Light brought to a believer". Doctor of Historical Sciences Sergey Bychkov explained this phenomenon through Alexandra Feodorovna's personality, citing a contemporary: "She embraced Orthodoxy with all her spontaneity and the depth inherent to her nature, becoming Orthodox in the most complete and absolute sense. Her new religious mood drew her to everything directly or indirectly connected to the Church".

Douglas Smith wrote that the emperor "was enchanted" by Mitya, while Candidate of Historical Sciences Andrey Tereshchuk called him a "mystical friend" of the imperial family. Tereshchuk noted that early 20th-century public consciousness recognized several ambiguous religious types: startsy (monks marked by grace, able to warn potential sinners of sinful thoughts), people of God (laypeople-ascetics acting as prophetic intermediaries between God and humanity), fools for Christ (who voluntarily reject material comforts and societal norms, often mingling with society's outcasts to reform them), and wanderers (characterized by physical and mental instability due to their perception of the world's imperfection, distinguishing them from pilgrims—tourists visiting holy sites). However, clear boundaries between these categories were absent.

In the published archive of Tibetan doctor Pyotr Badmaev, a Letter from the Fool Mitya Kozelsky to Nicholas II was found and printed. There, Mitya repeatedly addresses the emperor as "daddy". The letter argues that the Russian Orthodox Church supports autocracy, with monasteries as the church's stronghold, and calls the Theotokos the abbess of holy abodes. It cites the Theotokos delivering a miraculous icon in 1073 for the under-construction Dormition Cathedral in Kyiv, noting that since 1667, this icon has been in Moscow's Dormition Cathedral. Mitya informs the tsar of a 200,000-ruble theft uncovered at Optina Pustyn. Bishop Seraphim has already left to report this to the Synod, but Mitya fears the case will stall and asks Nicholas to personally oversee its resolution.

According to Iliodor, courtiers preferred Mitya to Rasputin. Among his close friends in the tsar's entourage were: head of the Tsarskoye Selo Palace Administration Mikhail Putyatin, head of the Imperial Military Field Chancellery Prince Vladimir Orlov, and palace commandant Vladimir Dedyulin, who later regularly supplied him with information about Grigory Rasputin. One of Mitya Kozelsky's admirers at this time was Ivan Fedchenkov, a student at the Saint Petersburg Theological Academy, who later became a prominent figure in the White Movement and the Russian Orthodox Church in the USSR. In his dissertation, Ilya Solovyov claimed that the "court camarilla" actively used Mitya to secure ranks and awards.

=== Against Rasputin ===
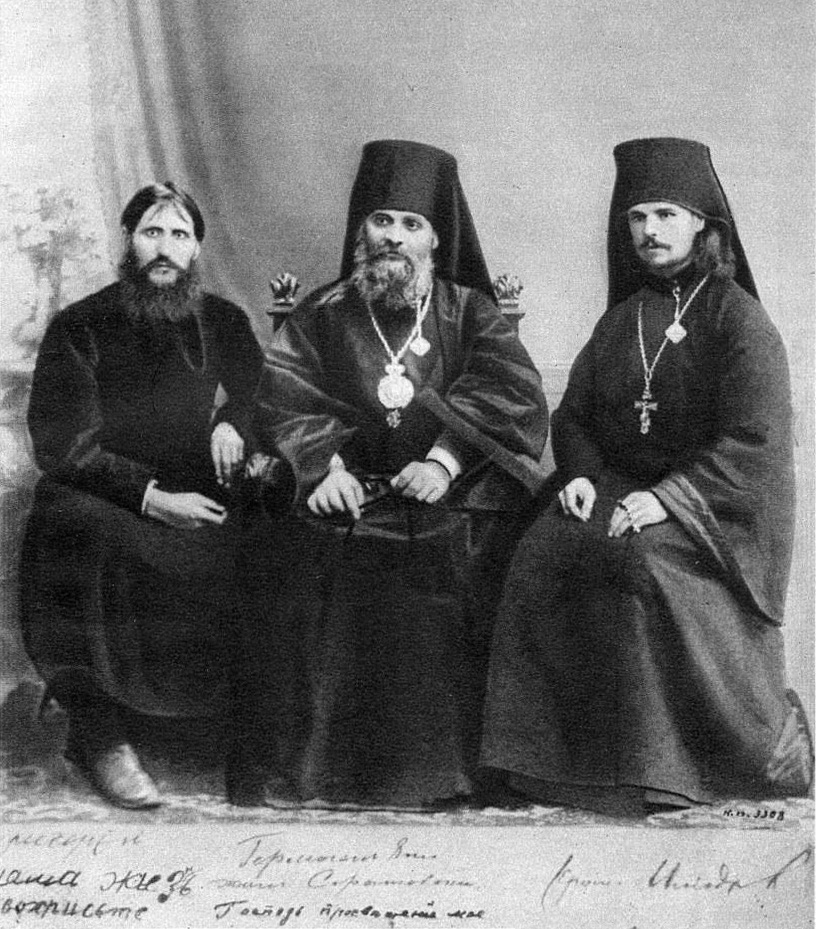
Grigory Rasputin, Bishop Hermogenes, and Hieromonk Iliodor, 1908

Based on police archives from January 1912, Douglas Smith wrote that Rasputin and Mitya Kozelsky had been close friends for years before they fell out. Rasputin disapproved of Mitya hugging and kissing a woman from his circle, accusing him of "debauchery. Mitya replied that he was emulating Rasputin in "mortifying the flesh. After this quarrel, Mitya began to oppose Rasputin, branding him a "fraud," though Smith saw his primary motive as a desire to usurp Rasputin's place in the imperial circle. Rasputin sought Mitya's expulsion from St. Petersburg. Protopresbyter of the Russian Army and Navy Georgy Shavelsky claimed in his memoirs that Bishops Theophan and Hermogenes brought Mitya Kozelsky into the tsar's family to counter Rasputin's influence. However, he "soon failed" after "writing an indiscreet letter to the tsar on Bishop Hermogenes' letterhead, which offended him", after which, according to Shavelsky, he was no longer invited to the palace. The memoirs of Prince Nikolai Zhevakhov and some modern historians suggest that the reason was his marriage to a young graduate of the Smolny Institute for Noble Maidens. Andrey Tereshchuk attributed his "dismissal" to both the marriage and the unconvincing nature of his predictions.

Many sources and researchers claim that Mitya Kozelsky lost his stable position at the court after Grigory Rasputin gained significant influence. (Note: Lev Klyachko claimed that Kananykin, anticipating the rise of Rasputin and having already accumulated a large sum of money, said at the end of one of the fortune-telling sessions in late 1905 that Mitya was going to pray in the Optina desert. The journalist claimed (contrary to the testimony of his contemporaries) that after that Mitya and Elpidifor disappeared from the horizon.) According to Iliodor, "Mitya was dismissed into 'retirement' without even a pension". Through court allies, he began to monitor Rasputin's activities". Douglas Smith described Mitya's dire psychological state, noting that he was often seen barefoot in a black cassock on the winter streets of St. Petersburg, with long, matted hair.

In 1910, Mitya lived in Kozelsk and was considered Rasputin's enemy. He established a "bureau to record women harmed in some way by Rasputin's activities as a starets". Among them, Lenochka T. (Elena Timofeeva), a graduate of the Isidorov Diocesan Theological School, found refuge there for months. Having briefly fallen under Rasputin's sway, she feared his retribution after leaving. Candidate of Historical Sciences Daniil Kotsyubinsky and Doctor of Medical Sciences, Professor Aleksandr Kotsyubinsky wrote of a faction around Mitya Kozelsky, displaced by Rasputin, uniting all of the elder's opponents.

In December 1911, Rasputin was summoned to Bishop Hermogenes of Saratov and Tsaritsyn, who was in Saint Petersburg for a Synod meeting. Hermogenes demanded he permanently leave the capital and cease contact with the imperial family. Iliodor recounted that during days of (remote) denunciations of the starets (December 11–16, 1911) preceding the summons, Mitia, in Hermogenes's quarters at the Yaroslavl compound, "for days and countless times" shouted: "Hang me now, hang me, but I'm telling the truth!" Candidate of Historical Sciences Georgy Platonov believed Mitya Kozelsky and writer Ivan Rodionov informed hermogenes of Rasputin's leanings to Khlysty movement".

On December 29, 1911 there was a personal face-to-face meeting between Rasputin, Iliodor (who documented it), Mitya Kozelsky, Hermogenes, and Ivan Rodionov. Daniil Kotsyubinsky and Aleksandr Kotsyubinsky also noted the presence of theology candidate Stepan Tverdynsky, priests Sergey Ledovsky and Mikhail Soshestvensky, and merchant Chernyshev.

Hermogenes initially remained silent. Iliodor wrote that Mitya's accusations were both terrifying and comical: "Oh you, a godless man, you’ve hurt many women! You’ve hurt many nannies! You are living with the tsarina! You are the Antichrist!" Mitya grabbed Rasputin by the sleeve, dragged him to an icon, shouting louder and more frantically. Rasputin was visibly frightened by the fool's behavior. Another eyewitness, Ivan Rodionov, in an oral account (reproduced by Mikhail Rodzianko, Chairman of the Third and Fourth State Dumas, in the Collapse of the Empire) omitted these details, mentioning Mitya Kozelsky only once: "Rasputin, with great physical strength, broke free and fled. But Iliodor, a cell mate, and the wanderer Mitya caught up and roughed him up considerably". Chairman of the Council of Ministers in 1911–1914, Vladimir Kokovtsov, recounted it differently: when Hermogenes and Iliodor began denouncing Rasputin, he "grew heated and cursed". The cursing escalated into a fight due to Iliodor's fervor and might have ended in Rasputin's strangulation" "had the fool Mitya Kozelsky, present at the scene, not intervened on his behalf".

Georgy Shavelsky wrote that as Rasputin tried to flee during the meeting with Hermogenes, "Iliodor, Mitia, and someone else pounced on him, knocked him down, and tried to castrate him. The operation failed as Grishka broke free". Aleksandr Voznesensky also claimed that Mitya "tried, with the mad Hermogenes, to castrate Rasputin". Aleksandr and Daniil Kotsyubinsky adopted this version, adding details from an unnamed source: "Mitya Kozelsky lunged at Rasputin with accusations, dragged him to an icon, and, seizing his penis, reportedly tried to cut off Rasputin's penis with scissors. Failing in this bold surgical endeavor, Mitya furiously spat in Grigory's face". They began strangling Rasputin, but Mitya's clumsiness allowed the emperor's favorite to escape, curse Hermogenes, and flee outside, complaining to passersby that they tried to castrate him.

Another version of events is given by Doctor of Historical Theology Oleg Zhigankov with reference to the words of Grigory Rasputin's daughter: the meeting was attended by officers armed with sabers, "demon-possessed Mitya began to beat Rasputin, biting and shouting in a shrill voice insulting words", Rasputin broke free, raised a chair in the air, frightened the attackers, left the room and locked them in that chair. In the memoirs of Rasputin's eldest daughter, Matryona, there is a description of the scene at Hermogenes, but the fight is absent, and Mitya's participation is limited to the fact that he "shouted from time to time", observed the conversation on the raised tones from the outside, and did not interfere with it. Matryona Rasputina considered Mitya a protégé of Iliodor. In her opinion, he expected to use the jester in the interests of certain forces, the instrument of which was the hieromonk himself. The mistake of these forces was to understand too easily the fascination of the emperor and his wife with "holy people". Despite their religious exaltation, they were people of their time — rationalists.

British historian and journalist Brian Moynahan, a graduate of Corpus Christi College, Cambridge, attributed the castration initiative to Mitya Kozelsky, suggesting he was even prepared to kill Rasputin.

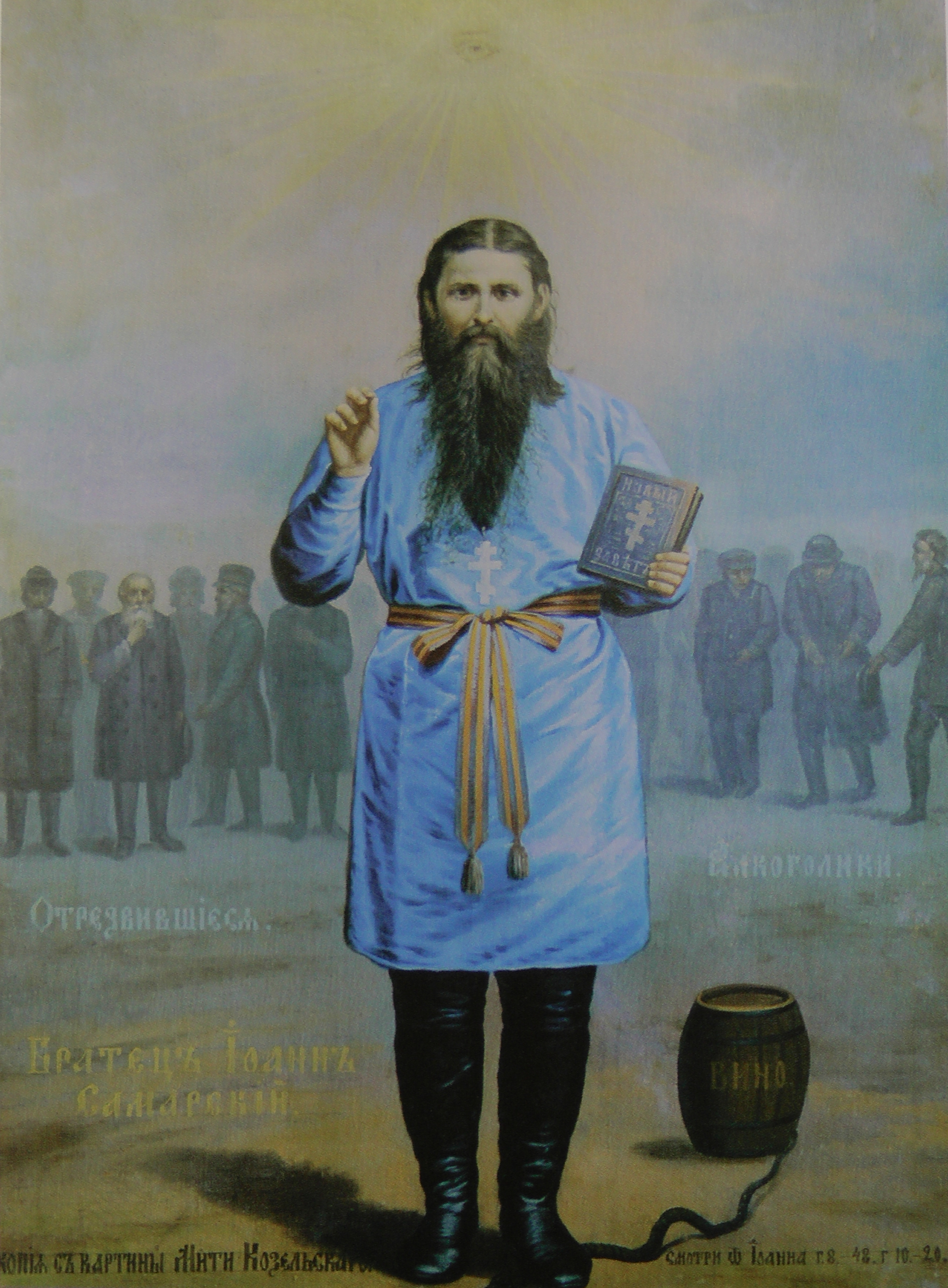
Mitya Kozelsky. Johan Samarsky (Churikov). Copy of a painting by Mitya Kozelsky, gifted to Churikov, distributed by sobriety advocates from January 15, 1914.

After a decree about the Hermogenes firing was dismissed, Iliodor, citing Pyotr Badmaev, said Mitya to try to prevent Hermogenes's departure: he lay under the car's wheels, shouting. Another contemporary, Vladimir Kokovtsov, stated that Hermogenes arrived at Warsaw Station with Mitya Kozelsky. Spotting a gendarmerie general, Solovyov, Hermogenes wanted to turn back, but Mitya tugged his sleeve, yelling: "We must obey the tsar, submit to his will!" This compelled Hermogenes to board the train. Pyotr Badmaev, in a letter to palace commandant Dedyulin, claimed Mitya spoke similar words not at the station but during a personal meeting. Badmaev said he asked Mitya to persuade the bishop to comply with authorities, and despite being "very ill," the fool visited Hermogenes for this purpose.

Kokovtsov claimed that a week earlier, an order was issued to deport Mitya. Saint Petersburg's mayor Daniil Drachevsky assured Interior Minister Aleksandr Makarov that Mitya had already fled the city. In reality, Kokovtsov speculated, Mitya was hiding at Hermogenes's compound and thus accompanied him to the station.

=== Mitya Kozelsky from January 1912 to January 1917 ===
Aleksandr Voznesensky believed that Rasputin was afraid of Mitya for a long time. He quoted an Iliodor's letter (January 25, 1912) stating that Rasputin repeatedly said: "We should do something with Mitya..." Rasputin succeeded in having Mitya sent back to Kozelsk. Mitya, fearing Rasputin's revenge, knew he had to "disappear" temporarily. Maurice Paléologue wrote on May 30, 1915: "Now he is living among a small secret sect and waiting for his hour".

Ksenia Chekodanova, a staff member of the State Museum of Political History, published an article featuring a reproduction of a copy of a painting by Mitya Kozelsky, created no later than 1914. The painting depicts the founder of the Russian socio-religious movement known as the Churikovtsy, portrayed as Brother Ioann Samarsky, trampling a "green serpent" crawling from a barrel labeled Wine; on the one side from Samarsky — Alcoholics, and on the other one — Sobered after reading the Johan Samarsy's preaching. This artwork is part of the State Museum of the History of Religion collection in Saint Petersburg. (Note: In the museum catalog, published in 2007, the painting is described as follows: “Anin. Portrait of John Samarsky, the founder of the All-Christian Temperance Society. Bezhetsk. The beginning of the 20th century. Canvas, oil, 76 x 54.5 cm".) The painting's presumed original title was Trampling the Green Serpent, gifted to Churikov on his name day, January 28, 1914.

Doctor of Historical Sciences Sergey Firsov, an expert on Russian Orthodox Church-state relations in the 20th century, wrote in Nicholas II: Captive of Autocracy, that after Rasputin's murder in December 1916, Petrograd's high society again spoke of Mitya Kozelsky and Vasily the Barefoot. Firsov commented: "The holy place never stays vacant". Doctor of Historical Sciences Nikolay Yakovlev also noted that during Rasputin's peak influence, the role of other "mystical friends" of the imperial family sharply declined. This changed radically after Rasputin's murder in December 1916.

In Moscow in 1917, Aleksandr Voznesensky wrote that after the monarchy's fall, Mitya Kozelsky was detained at Bryansk Station among dubious characters while traveling from Petrograd to Kozelsk. His interrogation at the Khamovniki commissariat involved a Kozelsk meshchanin interpreting his sounds. Mitya carried a passport as personal honorary citizen Dmitry Znobishin and a ticket for third-class travel on all Russian railways. Investigators probed his knowledge of Rasputin's murder. It emerged that Mitya's uncle was a cook for Prince Felix Yusupov, and it struck them as odd that Mitya was at the Yusupov Palace on the Moika on the night of the murder. Mitya recounted: "They drank tea, there were many guests, music played." Rasputin received a call from Grand Duke Dmitry Pavlovich but refused to come; Yusupov then fetched him in two cars. When the cars returned with Rasputin, their lights were off. Shots rang out, and Mitya and unnamed others rushed into the room where Rasputin's body lay. The body was tied up, two people carried it to a car and drove off. Dmitry Pavlovich patted Mitya on the shoulder, saying: "Go home, Mitya!" At the time of early liturgy, Mitya left for prayer. The newspaper Russkaya Volya on March 10, 1917, also confirmed Mitya's presence at Yusupov's palace that night.

=== After the February Revolution of 1917 ===
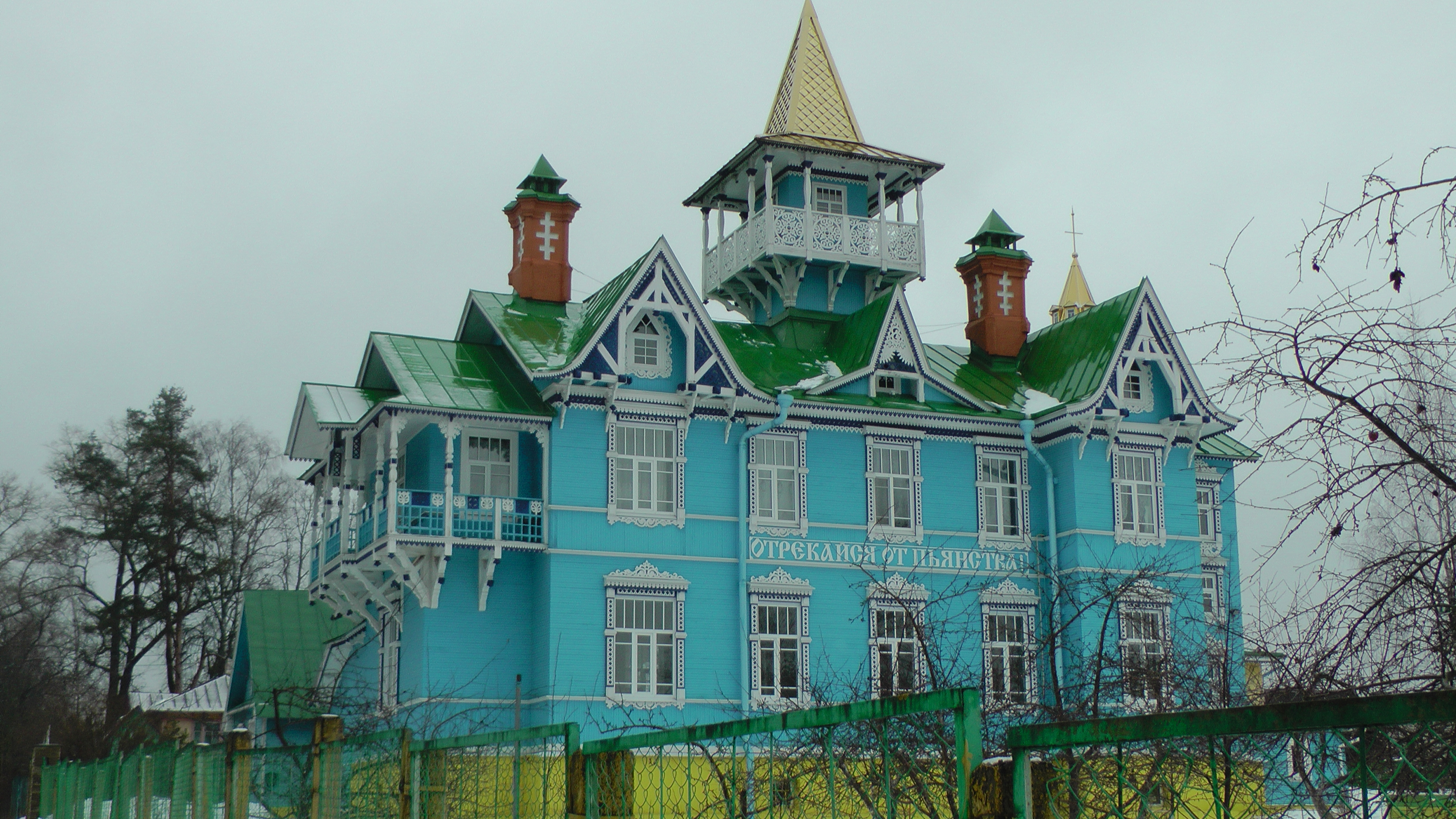
The temperance community house on Pavlovsky Prospekt in Vyritsa, where Mitya Kozelsky was last documented by a witness

After the February Revolution, Mitya Kozelsky was detained and interrogated. In a collection of documents tied to Ivan Churikov, founder of the temperance movement, Ekaterina Ermolova's 1927 recollection describes meeting Mitya Kozelsky on Pavlovsky Prospekt in Vyritsa near Leningrad, by Churikov's community house. She came up, greeted, and kissed the fool, but he shouted: "Need to buy a machine, need to buy a machine". Churikov gave her the same advice—to buy a sewing machine. This proved useful during the German occupation, enabling home-based work, leading her to view Mitya and Churikov's words as prophetic.

In 1929, numerous historians report that Mitya Kozelsky was sent to the Solovetsky Islands and executed there. (Note: Vadim Telitsyn mentioned Rasputin's prediction to Mita: “a terrible death on a remote island".) 88 Doctor of Historical Sciences and head of the documentary publications department at the Russian State Archive of Socio-Political History, Aleksandr Repnikov, was cautious in describing Mitya's Soviet-era fate in notes to L. A. Tikhomirov's Diary. He wrote: "[Mitya Kozelsky], according to one version, was arrested. His further fate is unknown. Per one account, "sent to the Solovetsky camp, where he was executed".

== Private life ==
Only Prince Nikolay Zhevakhov's memoirs discuss the fool's personal life. He claimed that "in a surge of religious ecstasy, one of the Smolny Institute's alumnae offered him her hand and heart, which 'Mitia,' to the horror of his admirers, accepted". Zhevakhov asserted that by marrying the Smolny alumna, Mitya Kozelsky "revealed his true motives for appearing in high society and buried his fame". After this, Zhevakhov believed, he was deemed a "deceiver and mystifier", losing his court influence. Tibetan doctor Peter Badmayev mentioned Mitya's wife in connection with her illness ("catarrh of the intestines").

== Contemporaries on Mitya Kozelsky ==
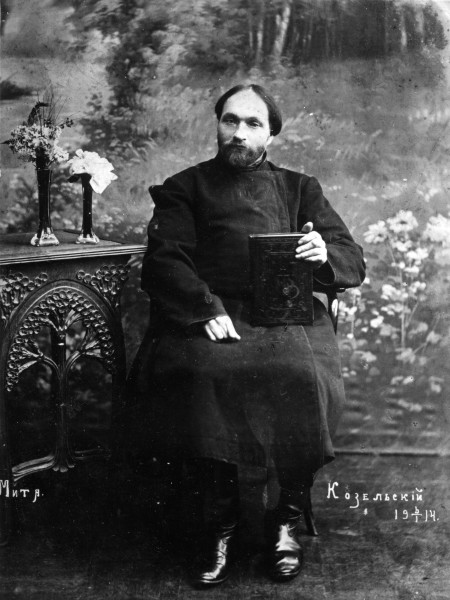
An unknown Russian photographer from the early 20th century. Mitya Kozelsky, 1914

The emperor's inner circle described Mitya Kozelsky as "feeble-minded," "blessed," or "a fool," yet noted his resemblance to a character from Alexander Pushkin's Boris Godunov. Police Department head Stepan Beletsky wrote in his memoirs and testimony to the Provisional Government's Investigative Commission that Rasputin feared Mitya Kozelsky and "jealously guarded his influence in high circles" from various miracle-workers, including Mitya. Iliodor argued that Mitya Kozelsky deserved no less attention than Rasputin.

Aleksandr Voznesensky testified that after the February Revolution, Mitya spoke of Nicholas II with rapture, "kissing his hands in delight". Of Alexandra Feodorovna, he said: "It's mama's fault! Daddy prayed, but mom is guilty, she wanted to execute me for Grishka, and Grishka's a devil! Devil, devil!" — while mimicking horns with two fingers. Voznesensky believed Mitya was selfless: "He needed nothing, really: wandering monasteries, idling—that was Mitya's calling. He roamed all his life. His wanderings brought him to court, where he took a place once held by Vasya Bosonogy and later by Grigory Rasputin". The February Revolution, he said, "swept away Mitya's enemies but also his patrons, casting him into a crowd of homeless vagrants." He admitted ignorance of Mitya's subsequent fate.

Prince Nikolay Zhevakhov, acting deputy Ober-Procurator of the Holy Synod, provided a detailed description in his memoirs. He noted Mitya's illiteracy and inability to speak, emitting "only incoherent sounds". Yet "folk rumor" saw him as a saint, sufficient to open the doors of the most fashionable salons. In his noises, facial expressions, and gestures, people sought God's will. Zhevakhov explained Mitya's phenomenon as society's disillusionment with Christian socialism theories, seeking answers to doubts and spiritual needs in a different realm—"folk religion," free of religious dilemmas, contradictions, or ties to science. Previously known among urban poor and market traders, such figures now entered elite salons and imperial drawing rooms. Zhevakhov deemed Mitya the most vivid representative of this folk faith. He concluded:

Petersburg society, led by its hierarchs, trusted even "tongue-tied Mitia," not because it was spiritually blind, but because it was acutely attuned to every religious phenomenon, preferring to err by mistaking a sinner for a saint than to dismiss a saint with condemnation.

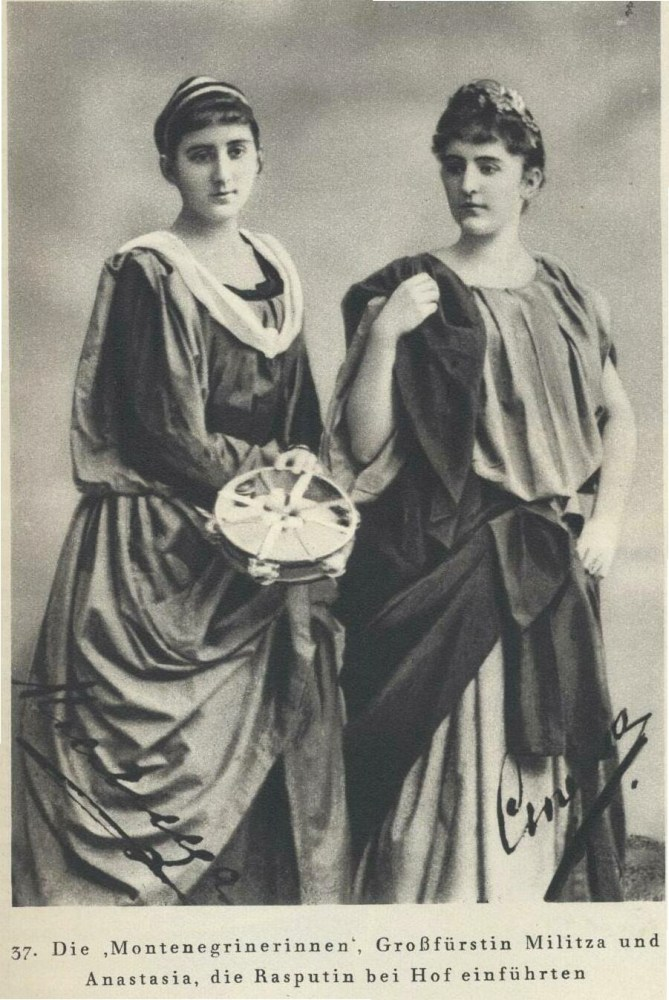
Grand Duchesses Anastasia and Militsa, 1900s

Kadet leader Pavel Milyukov linked Mitya's court presence to a shift in Alexandra Feodorovna's views. He argued that in the early 1900s, she broke free from Empress Maria Feodorovna's influence—whom he tied to liberal sentiments—and fell under the Slavic sway of Montenegrins Anastasia and her sister Militsa. This shifted her from venerating Frenchman Nizier Anthelme Philippe to favoring "national fools." Milyukov listed Mitya Kozelsky among them, alongside Iliodor and Rasputin, giving him the derogatory label "little idiot".

French Republic Ambassador to Russia Maurice Paléologue admitted in his World War I memoirs that he never saw Mitya Kozelsky but questioned a prominent Russian bureaucrat with nationalist views, Mr. E., about him. E., who knew the fool well, described him: "deaf, mute, half-blind, bow-legged, with a crooked spine and two stumps for arms. His brain, atrophied like his limbs, holds only a few rudimentary ideas, expressed through guttural sounds, stuttering, grunting, mooing, squealing, and erratic stump gestures". Journalist Lev Klyachko recalled Mitya in his 1926 memoirs: "A typical epileptic, with bulging, vacant eyes and constant characteristic drooling. His speech was barely intelligible, making him hard to understand. Mitka invariably kissed everyone he met. Haughty bureaucrats endured this slobbering, leaving sticky saliva on their noble cheeks, which they discreetly wiped off in disgust".

During interrogations by the Extraordinary Investigative Commission, Pyotr Badmaev offered a relatively favorable view of Mitya Kozelsky:

For about two years, I treated the fool Mitia Kozelsky for catarrhal inflammation of the lungs and his wife for catarrh of the intestines. I found Mitia Kozelsky to be an intelligent and religious peasant. He was hard to understand because he was tongue-tied. He told me that he had been received by the Tzar, but said nothing of their conversation.

== Mitya Kozelsky in culture ==
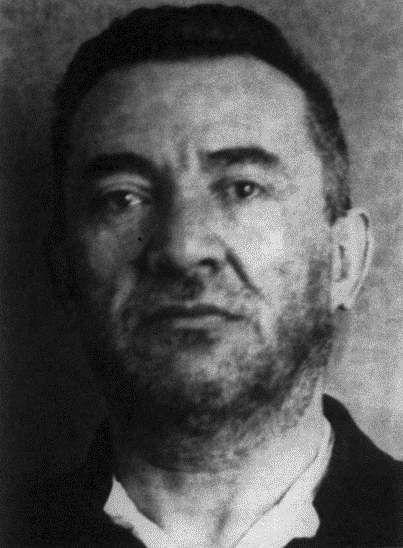
Ilya Vasilevsky in 1937

=== In fiction and journalism ===
In 1923, in a series of essays on the Romanovs, the journalist Ilya Vasilevsky (Ne-Bukva) published the text Nicholas II, in which Mitya Kozelsky appears in Chapter VII. At first he and the "entrepreneur" Elpidifor predict the fate of the provincials, but after prophesying to Countess Abamelek-Lazareva, they are summoned to St. Petersburg. Mitya arrives at the court, where Empress Alexandra Feodorovna tries to find out the sex of the future child during his seizures. Everything ends in a premature birth.

After that, according to Vasilevsky, the Tale of Tsar Saltan disappears from the repertoire of the Mariinsky Theatre, and in Nizhny Novgorod a calendar depicting a woman and piglets is confiscated — an allusion to the incident in St. Petersburg. Mitya is removed from the court, but returned. As a result, Elpidifor, dissatisfied with the banishment, begins to beat Mitya so often that he soon dies.

The Diary of the maid of honor Anna Vyrubova, published in 1927-1928, raised doubts about its authenticity. It may have been based on a notebook mentioned during Vyrubova's interrogation in 1917. The entries describe Mitya's arrival in St. Petersburg, his prophecies, and the communion incident that disgusted the Grand Duchess. It is also mentioned that he tried to scratch Rasputin.

Mitya also appears in Valentin Pikul's novel The Evil Force (1979, complete edition - 1989), where he is featured in the chapter the Roar of the Beast". According to the plot, he becomes a "miracle worker" that Elpidifor uses for profit. Elpidifor pushes him in a wheelbarrow, beats him, and takes him to the imperial couple, directly into their private chambers. Mitya "communicates" with the couple, suffers a seizure, the empress gives birth prematurely, and the jester is sent to Kozelsk. According to the fictional finale, Mitya recovers and lives in Badmaev's monasteries and clinic.

He also appears in chapters 11 and 12: he bites Rasputin and receives blows from him, and then the conspirators commission him to have Grigory defrocked.

=== Russian literature and journalism in emigration ===
In 1922, Boris Almazov's book Rasputin and Russia (historical background) was published in Prague. The book was written by a Russian emigrant in Vienna in 1921. Chapter XIII is dedicated to Mita Kozelsky. Egorov, a psalmist from the village of Goevo, who is assigned to take care of a 16-year-old boy, Dmitri Blagov, makes an unexpected discovery: during epileptic seizures, the boy foretells the future in seemingly incoherent sounds. The seizures are due to heredity and a severe fright in early childhood. After a few successful predictions, the peasants begin to turn to the boy for help. To induce prophetic seizures, Egorov begins to beat the Blessed. Count Nikolai Ignatiev presents Dmitry the Blessed to the imperial family in Tsarskoe Selo. For four months, the Empress attended to Dmitri's epileptic seizures, trying to get an answer to the question of the birth of an heir. In the fifth month there was a miscarriage, and the dead child was determined by the doctors to be male, which Alexandra Feodorovna interpreted in her favor as the influence of the Holy. Dmitri and Egorov are sent away, and soon the Blessed One dies during a seizure caused by another beating by the interpreter.

Soviet writer and later dissident, journalist and playwright Andrei Amalrik made Mitya Kozelsky a minor character in his documentary story Rasputin. The author was not able to finish it, as he died in a car accident in 1980. Mitya became an actor in several episodes of the story: communicates with the Imperial family in Tsarskoe Selo, participates in the beating of Rasputin in the apartments of Hermogenes, helps his friend Iliodoru escape from the authorities.

=== In contemporary Russian literature and journalism ===
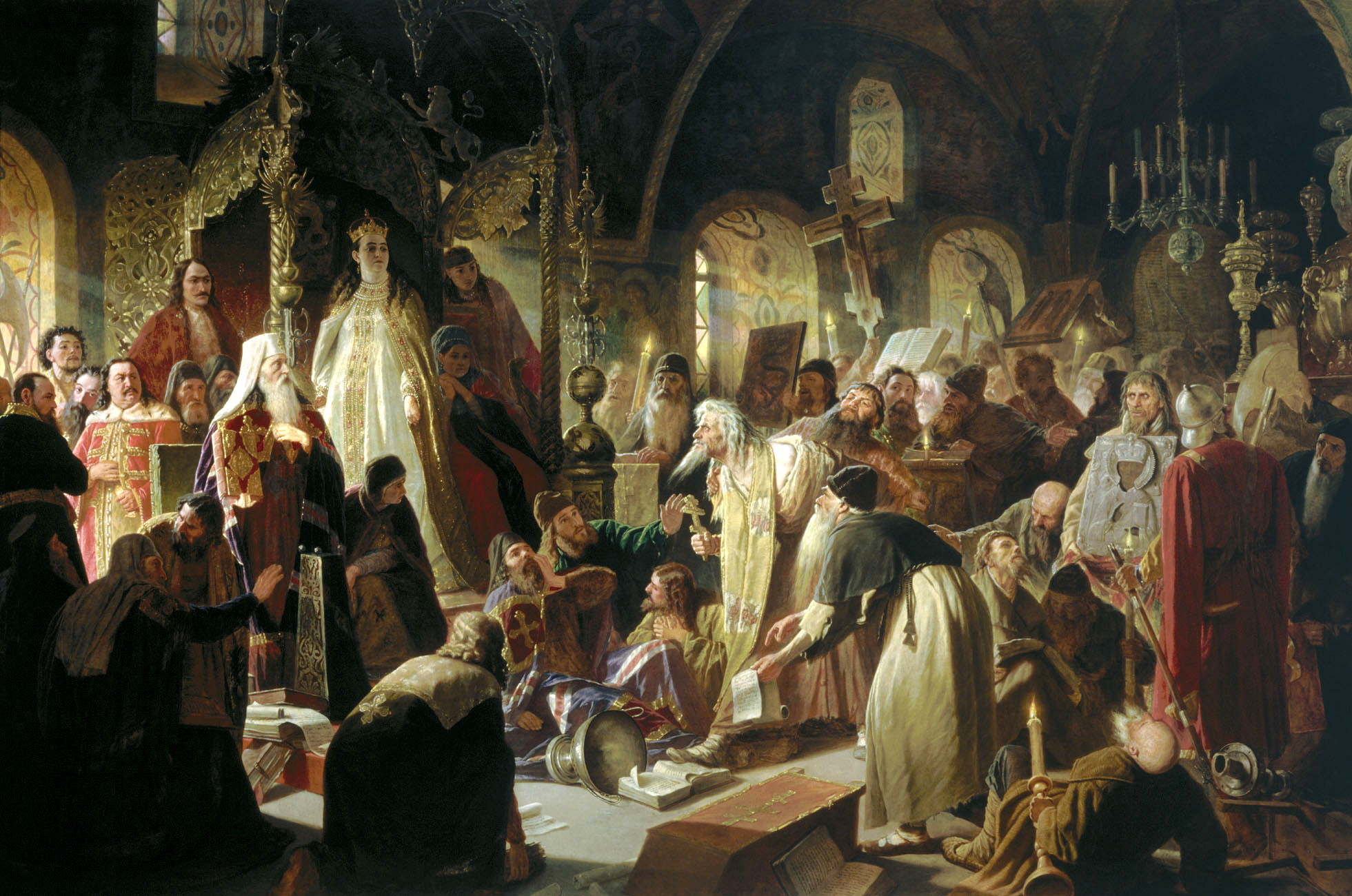
Vasily Perov. Nikita Pustosvyat. Debate about faith, 1880-1881

The Russian writer Alexander Strizhyov, in his essay on Sergei Nilus, mentioned a painting that the icon painter Dmitry Bolotov (in the monastery Daniil) had painted before his death in 1907. The canvas, sent to Nicholas II, depicted the emperor, empress and heir apparent ascending to heaven, protected from demons by Mitya Kozelsky. According to Strizhyov, it was this painting and the support of the Nilus spouses that sparked interest in the jester in the capital and his invitation to the court, although the source is not cited[118] (Note: The famous monarchist politician and theologian Lev Tikhomirov in his diary left indirect evidence of acquaintance Nilus and Mitya Kozelsky. He wrote on November 3, 1905: “By evening I received a curious letter from Nilus with the predictions of the foolish Mitya Kozelsky”.) 119

Eduard Radzinsky in his book Rasputin. Life and Death, describes Mitya Kozelsky, citing Vyrubova's diary (which claims that Mitya did not meet with the royal family),[120] attributing to him predictions of the Russo-Japanese War[121] and of Hermogenes' Patriarchate[122] as well as participation in the clergy meeting with Rasputin on December 16[123]. Although he cites sources at the end of the book, he does not footnote specific quotes, making the information unverifiable. For example, he writes: "His influence on the masses of the people is enormous..." - without indicating from which police file this statement is taken[124].

Alexander Bushkov in the chapter Man and Myth of the book Rasputin. Shots from the Past, describes how Governor Ignatiev tells about the "peasant boy" Mitya Blessed. For four months the Empress watched the Yurodist's seizures, expecting a prophecy, but after a miscarriage he was banished along with the interpreter, despite their protests[125].

In Alexander Pavlov's novel Snow on the Moor, Mitya appears accompanied by two women, one of whom is his interpreter. One of the characters calls such people the saviors of Holy Russia. The author compares the fool with Nikita Pustosvyat from Perov's painting and describes the appearance of Kozelsky in detail: sad gray-green eyes, fingers of the right hand — reduced to two fingers[130].

Andrei Gusarov in his book Grigory Rasputin. The Life of an Elder and the Decline of the Empire describes how Archimandrite Theophan shows Mita a photo of Rasputin, which he tears and calls him the Antichrist[126]. In another scene (December 6, 1911), Mitya defends Rasputin against Iliodor[127]. In the finale, he persuades Hermogenes to submit to the will of the sovereign[128].

=== In cinematography ===
Yurodivy is a supporting character in Elem Klimov's film Agony (1974). His role is played by G. Stolyarov. The only episode with Mitya Kozelsky's participation in the film is a scene in the chambers of Bishop Hermogenes. In the eight-part television series Grigory R., directed by Andrei Malyukov in 2014, the role of Mitya Kozelsky was played by Oleg Garkusha, frontman of the band AuktsYon. The only episode with his participation is the scene in which the incomprehensible sounds and movements of the jester, surrounded by the imperial family and courtiers, are interpreted by Elpidifor Kananykin as a demand to remove Grigory Rasputin from the court.

== Bibliography ==
=== Mitya Kozelsky's sources ===
- Kozelsky, M. (1925). "Письмо юродивого «Мити» Козельского Николаю II". За кулисами царизма (архив тибетского врача Бадмаева) [Behind the scenes of tsarism (archive of Tibetan doctor Badmaev)] (in Russian). Л.: Государственное издательство. pp. 13–14.

=== Sources ===
- Komkov M. P., Plotnikova V. V. (2014). Апостол трезвости. Иоанн Алексеевич Чуриков [Apostle of sobriety. John Alexeyevich Churikov] (in Russian). СПб.: Алетейя. p. 239. ISBN 978-5-91419-994-1.
- Badmayev, P. A. (1925). Письмо Бадмаева к дворцовому коменданту Дедюлину // За кулисами царизма (архив тибетского врача Бадмаева) [Badmayev's letter to the palace commandant Dedyulin // Behind the scenes of tsarism (archive of the Tibetan doctor Badmayev)] (in Russian). Л.: Государственное издательство. pp. 3–5.
- Basova, М. V. (2007). "Иоанн Алексеевич Чуриков (Самарский)". Русское искусство из Государственного музея истории религии [Russian art from the State Museum of the History of Religion] (in Russian). М.: Белый город. p. 289. ISBN 978-5-7793-1063-5.
- Beletsky, S. P. (1925). "Показания". Падение царского режима. Стенографические отчёты допросов и показаний, данных в 1917 г. в Чрезвычайной следственной комиссии Временного правительства. Редакция П. Е. Щёголева [The Fall of the Tsarist Regime. Verbatim reports of interrogations and testimony given in 1917 before the Extraordinary Investigative Commission of the Provisional Government] (in Russian). Vol. IV. Записки А. Д. Протопопова и С. П. Белецкого. Л.: Государственное издательство. pp. 117–533.
- Beletsky, S. P. (1990). "Григорий Распутин". Святой чёрт. Сборник [Holy Devil. Compendium] (in Russian). М.: Книжная палата. pp. 10–78. ISBN 5-7000-0235-3.
- Bogoslovsky, M. M. (2011). Дневники. 1913—1919 [Dieries. 1913—1919] (in Russian). М.: WebKniga. ISBN 978-5-9691-0894-3.
- Voznesensky, A. N. (1928). "V. Суды. Следственные комиссии. Митя Козельский — враг Распутина. Чрезвычайная следственная комиссия. Реквизиция особняка Кшесинской в Петрограде и гостиницы «Дрезден» в Москве". Москва в 1917 году [Moscow in 1917] (in Russian). М., Л.: Государственное издательство. pp. 36–43.
- Bruk Ya., Iovleva I. (2006). Государственная Третьяковская галерея — каталог собрания [State Tretyakov Gallery - catalog of the collection] (in Russian). Vol. 4: Живопись второй половины XIX века, книга 2, Н–Я. М.: Красная площадь. p. 560. ISBN 5-900743-22-5.
- Ermolova, Е. А. (2011). "31. Рассказ внучки С. И. Ермолова Екатерины Александровны Ермоловой". "Имя моё грешное помяните…" [“Remember my sinful name...”] (in Russian). СПб.: Алетейя. pp. 176–187. ISBN 978-5-91419-448-9.
- Zhevakhov, N. D. (1993). "LVII. Религиозная атмосфера Петербурга. Предшественники Распутина – архимандрит Михаил, священник Григорий Петров и косноязычный Митя". Воспоминания товарища Обер-Прокурора Святейшего Синода князя Н. Д. Жевахова [Memoirs of Prince N. D. Zhevakhov, Comrade of the Ober-Procurator of the Holy Synod] (in Russian). Vol. 1. Сентябрь 1915 — март 1917. М.: Родник, Издательский отдел Спасо-Преображенского Валаамского Ставропигиального монастыря. pp. 282–287. ISBN 5-8623-1169-6.
- Kokovtsov, V. N. (1933). "2. Скандал между Распутиным, Гермогеном и Илиодором…". Из моего прошлого. Воспоминания 1903—1919 гг [From my past. Memories 1903-1919] (in Russian). Таллинн: Издание журнала «Иллюстрированная Россия», . — Т. 2. — С. pp. 19–44.
- Lvov, L. (1926). "Придворные прорицатели". За кулисами старого режима. Воспоминания журналиста [Behind the old regime stage. Memories of a journalist] (in Russian). Vol. 1. Л.: Ленинградский Гублит. pp. 37–42.
- Milyukov, P. N. (1955). "Разложение думского большинства". Воспоминания (1859—1917) [Memories (1859—1917)] (in Russian). Vol. 2. Нью-Йорк: Издательство имени Чехова. pp. 79–94.
- Mironenko, S. V. (2013). "Николай II. 14-го января. Суббота". Дневники императора Николая II (1894—1918) [Diaries of Emperor Nicholas II (1894-1918)]. Бумаги дома Романовых (in Russian). Vol. 2 (1905—1918). Part 1 (1905—1913). М.: Российская политическая энциклопедия. p. 109. ISBN 978-5-8243-1601-8.
- Obninsky, V. P. (2019). "Последний самодержец (Материалы для характеристики Николая II)". Николай II: pro et contra, антология [Nicholas II: pro et contra, an anthology] (PDF) (in Russian). СПб.: РХГА, . — С. 108—164. — 116 с. — (Русский Путь). — ISBN. pp. 108–164. ISBN 978-5-8881-2726-1.
- Paleologue, M. (1923). "Тайный конкурент старца Митя Коляба". Распутин. Воспоминания [Rasputin. Memories] (in Russian). М.: Девятое января. pp. 34–38.
- Последние известия [Last news] (in Russian). Петроград: Труд: Газета. 1917. p. 3.
- Распутин. Последний временщик последнего царя (Материалы чрезвычайной следственной комиссии временного правительства о Распутине и разложении самодержавия) [Rasputin. The last temporizer of the last tsar (Materials of the Extraordinary Investigative Commission of the provisional government on Rasputin and the decay of the autocracy)] (in Russian). Вопросы истории: Журнал. 1964. pp. 90–103. Archived from the original on 28 March 2022.
- Rasputina, M. G. (2002). Распутин. Почему? Воспоминания дочери [Rasputin. Why? The daughter's memories] (in Russian). М.: Захаров. p. 284. ISBN 5-8159-0458-9.
- Rodzyanko, M. V. (1997). "Крушение империи". Григорий Распутин. Сборник исторических материалов в 4-х томах [Grigory Rasputin. Compilation of historical materials in 4 volumes] (in Russian). Vol. 1. М.: Терра; Книжная лавка. ISBN 5-3000-1424-9.
- Tikhomirov, L. A. (2015). "3 ноября". Дневник Л. А. Тихомирова. 1905–1907 гг [L. A. Tikhomirov's Diary. 1905-1907] (in Russian). М.: Политическая энциклопедия. pp. 152–153. ISBN 978-5-8243-1985-9.
- Trufanov, S. M. (2016). Святой чёрт (Записки о Распутине) [Holy devil (Notes on Rasputin)] (in Russian). М.: Directmedia. p. 242. ISBN 978-5-4475-8343-9.
- Shavelsky, G. I. (2010). "Распутинщина при дворе". Воспоминания последнего протопресвитера русской армии и флота [Memories of the last Protopresbyter of the Russian Army and Navy]. Материалы по истории русской церкви (Книга 11—12) (in Russian). М.: Издательство Крутицкого подворья, Общество любителей древней истории. pp. 71–92.

=== Fiction and researches ===
- Aleksandrova, K. A. (2009). Император Николай II и художественные процессы в русской культуре рубежа XIX—XX веков. Диссертация на соискание учёной степени кандидата искусствоведения [Emperor Nicholas II and artistic processes in Russian culture of the turn of the 19th-20th centuries. (Dissertation for the degree of Candidate of Art History)] (in Russian). М.: Московский государственный художественно-промышленный университет им. С. Г. Строганова. p. 301.
- Balyazin, V. N. (2008). Романовы. Семейные тайны русских императоров [The Romanovs. Family secrets of Russian emperors] (in Russian). М.: ОЛМА Медиа Групп. p. 527. ISBN 978-5-373-00280-6.
- Bokhanov, А. N. (2011). Правда о Григории Распутине [The truth about Grigory Rasputin] (in Russian). М.: Русский издательский центр. p. 606. ISBN 978-5-4249-0002-0.
- Bychkov, S. S. (2002). "Григорий Распутин — борьба у престола". Православная российская церковь и императорская власть, 1900—1917 гг. Диссертация на соискание учёной степени доктора исторических наук [The Orthodox Russian Church and Imperial Power, 1900-1917. Dissertation for the degree of Doctor of Historical Sciences] (in Russian). М.: Академия государственной службы при Президенте Российской Федерации. pp. 245–258.
- Varlamov, А. N. (2012). Григорий Распутин-Новый [Grigory Rasputin-Noviy]. Жизнь замечательных людей (in Russian). М.: Молодая гвардия. p. 851. ISBN 978-5-235-03586-7.
- Vozchikov V. A., Kozlov Yu. Ya., Koltakov K. G. (1998). Костёр для «святого чёрта»: историко-литературное исследование [Bonfire for the “holy devil”: a historical and literary study] (in Russian). Бийск: НИЦ БиГПИ. p. 222. ISBN 5-8512-7138-8.
- Gorbovsky А. А., Semyonov Yu. (1988). "Жизнь на вулкане". Закрытые страницы истории [Closed pages of history]. Библиотечная серия (in Russian). М.: Мысль. p. 286. ISBN 5-2440-0272-4.
- Grigorenko, А. Yu. (1991). "Колдовство и колдуны на Руси". Сатана там правит бал. Критические очерки магии [Satan rules the ball there. Critical Essays on Magic] (in Russian). Киев: Украина. pp. 116–140. ISBN 5-319-00427-3.
- Zhigankov, O. A. (2013). "17. Позорный Собор". Григорий Распутин: правда и ложь [Grigory Rasputin: truth and lies]. Книги жизни (in Russian). М.: ЭКСМО. pp. 189–196. ISBN 978-5-6996-1515-5.
- Iskenderov, А. А. (2001). Закат империи [The decline of empire] (in Russian). М.: Редакция журнала «Вопросы истории». p. 704. ISBN 5-86397-002-2.
- Kotsubinsky A. P., Kotsubinsky D. А. (2014). Распутин: Жизнь. Смерть. Тайна [Rasputin: Life. Death. Mystery.]. Биографии, автобиографии, мемуары (in Russian). М.: Азбука-Аттикус, Азбука. p. 417. ISBN 978-5-389-07704-1.
- Moinekhen, B. (1999). Питер / Скандал // Григорий Распутин: святой, который грешил [Saint-Petersburg / Scandal // Grigory Rasputin: the saint who sinned]. Человек-легенда (in Russian). Смоленск: Русич. pp. 76–96, 253–276. ISBN 5-8859-0962-8.
- Novikov, V. V. (2005). "2. Паранормальные фигуры (оккультисты, юродивые, «старцы») и придворные интриги. 1. Русские юродивые и французские оккультисты как инструмент влияния придворных группировок на императорскую семью". Борьба группировок в придворном окружении Николая II. Диссертация на соискание учёной степени кандидата исторических наук [The struggle of factions in the court circle of Nicholas II. Dissertation for the degree of Candidate of Historical Sciences] (in Russian). М.: Московский государственный областной университет. pp. 119–130.
- Platonov, G. M. (2003). Православная церковь и общественно-политическая жизнь провинциальной России. 1900—1914 гг. На материалах Саратовской губернии. Диссертация на соискание учёной степени кандидата исторических наук [The Orthodox Church and the Social and Political Life of the Russian Provinces. 1900-1914. On the Materials of the Saratov Province. Dissertation for the Degree of Candidate of Historical SciencesThe Factional Struggle in the Court of Nicholas II. Dissertation for the degree of Candidate of Historical Sciences] (in Russian). Саратов: Саратовский государственный социально-экономический университет. p. 241.
- Schegoleva, P. E. (1927). "Приложение. Указатель имён". Падение царского режима. Стенографические отчёты допросов и показаний, данных в 1917 г. в Чрезвычайной следственной комиссии Временного правительства [The Fall of the Tsarist Regime. Verbatim reports of interrogations and testimony given in 1917 before the Extraordinary Investigative Commission of the Provisional Government] (in Russian). М., Л.: Государственное издательствo. pp. 299–444.
- Repnikov, A. V. (2015). "Митя Козельский". Дневник Л. А. Тихомирова. 1905–1907 гг [The Fall of the Tsarist Regime. Verbatim reports of interrogations and testimony given in 1917 in the Extraordinary Investigative Commission of the ProvisionalDiary of L. A. Tikhomirov. 1905-1907 of the government] (in Russian). М.: Политическая энциклопедия. p. 487. ISBN 978-5-8243-1985-9.
- Sergeev, А. А. (1928). Об одной литературной подделке (Дневник А. А. Вырубовой) [On a literary forgery (Diary of A. A. Vyrubova)] (in Russian). Vol. 8. Историк-марксист: Журнал. pp. 161–172.
- Smith, D. (2019). Распутин. Вера, власть и закат Романовых [Rasputin. Faith, power and the decline of the Romanovs]. Путешественники во времени (in Russian). М.: Эксмо-Пресс. p. 768. ISBN 978-5-0408-8804-7.
- Solovyov, I. V. (2002). "5. Митрополит Антоний в последние годы жизни". Митрополит Санкт-Петербургский и Ладожский Антоний (Вадковский) и российская церковно-общественная жизнь в начале XX столетия. Диссертация на соискание учёной степени кандидата исторических наук [Metropolitan Anthony (Vadkovsky) of St. Petersburg and Ladoga and Russian church and public life in the early XX century. Dissertation for the degree of Candidate of Historical Sciences] (in Russian). М.: МГУ имени М. В. Ломоносова. p. 226.
- Telitsyn, V. L. (1999). "Спаси и сохрани". Григорий Распутин [Grigory Rasputin]. Великие пророки (in Russian). М.: Олимп, Астрель, ACT. pp. 69–125. ISBN 5-271-00201-2.
- Tereschuk, А. V. (2006). "3. «Божий человек»". Григорий Распутин. Последний «старец» империи [Grigory Rasputin. The last "starets" of the empire] (in Russian). СПб.: Вита Нова. pp. 111–168. ISBN 5-9389-8103-4.
- Firsov, S. L. (2002). Русская церковь накануне перемен: (Конец 1890-х — 1918 гг.) [Grigory Rasputin. The last “starets” of the empireThe Russian Church on the eve of change: (The end of the 1890s - 1918)]. Церковные реформы (in Russian). М.: Культурный центр «Духовная библиотека». p. 623. ISBN 5-9427-0015-X.
- Firsov, S. L. (2010). "4. У бездны на краю: Великая война и царь". Николай II: Пленник самодержавия [Nicholas II: autocracy's prisoner]. Жизнь замечательных людей. Vol. 1279 (in Russian). М.: Молодая гвардия. pp. 330–434. ISBN 978-5-2350-3382-5.
- Chekodanov, K. K. (2007). Трезвеннические движения на берегах Невы (конец XIX — начало XX века) [Sobering movements on the banks of the Neva River (late 19th - early 20th centuries)] (PDF) (in Russian). Мир Петербурга: Журнал. pp. 60–63. Archived from the original (PDF) on 15 May 2022.
- Heresch, E. (2006). Распутин. Тайна его власти [Rasputin. The mystery of his power] (in Russian). М.: ОЛМА-ПРЕСС. p. 316. ISBN 5-224-05239-4.
- Yakovlev, N. N. (2003). "Набат брусиловского прорыва". 1 Август 1914 [1 August 1914]. Новейшая история (in Russian). М.: ЭКСМО. pp. 239–322. ISBN 5-6990-1574-4.

=== Fiction and journalism ===
- Almazov, B. (1922). "XIII". Распутин и Россия (историческая справка) [Rasputin and Russia (historical background)] (in Russian). Прага: Акционерное общество Славянское издательство. pp. 138–146.
- Amalrik, A. A. (1992). Распутин [Rasputin] (in Russian). М.: Слово / Slovo. Совместное предприятие. p. 352. ISBN 5-8505-0272-6.
- Bushkov, A. A. (2013). "8. Человек и миф". Распутин. Выстрелы из прошлого [Rasputin. Shots from the past]. Загадки истории (in Russian). М.: ОЛМА Медиа Групп. pp. 378–483. ISBN 978-5-3730-0949-2.
- Vasilievsky, I. M. (1993). "Николай II". Романовы. От Михаила до Николая. История в лицах и анекдотах [The Romanovs. From Michael to Nicholas. History in faces and anecdotes] (in Russian). Ростов-на-Дону: МАПРЕКОН. p. 384. ISBN 5-8319-0013-4.
- Gusarov, A. Yu. (2017). Григорий Распутин. Жизнь старца и гибель империи [Grigory Rasputin. His life and the empire's demise]. Всемирная история (in Russian). М.: Центрполиграф. p. 284. ISBN 978-5-2270-7259-7.
- "Дневник Анны Вырубовой". Фрейлина её величества. «Дневник» и воспоминания Анны Вырубовой [Grigory Rasputin. The life of the elder and the death of the empire. Her Majesty's maid of honor. “Diary” and memories of Anna Vyrubova] (in Russian). М.: Directmedia. 2018. pp. 11–147. ISBN 978-5-4475-8947-9.
- Pavlov, A. F. (2011). Снег на болоте [Snow on the marsh]. Русское зарубежье. Коллекция поэзии и прозы (in Russian). М.: Вагриус. p. 816. ISBN 978-5-9141-9442-7.
- Pikul, V. S. (1991). "10. Звериный рык". Нечистая сила [The Evil Force] (in Russian). М.: АСКИ, Раритет. pp. 74–80.
- Radzinsky, E. S. (2000). Pаспутин. Жизнь и смерть [Rasputin: life and death] (in Russian). М.: Вагриус. p. 575. ISBN 5-2640-0555-9.
- Strizhev, A. N. (2005). "По следам Сергея Нилуса". Нилус С. А. Собрание сочинений в 6-ти томах [Nilus S. A. Collected Works in 6 Volumes] (in Russian). Vol. 6. Произведения разных лет. Материалы к жизнеописанию Сергея Нилуса. М.: Паломник, Общество святителя Василия Великого. pp. 391–526.
