= Sergei Trufanov =

Russian writer (1880–1952)

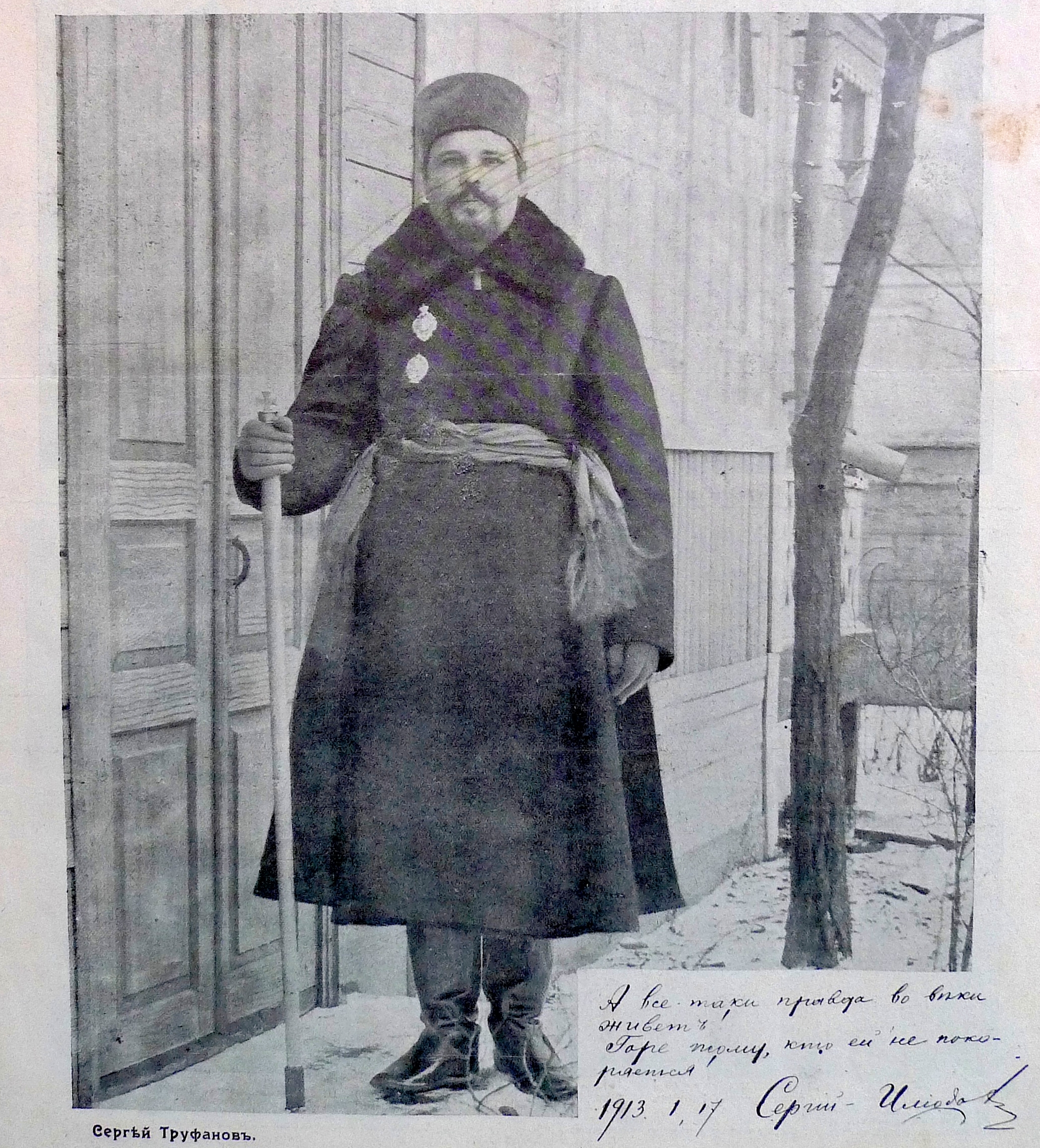
- Trufanov in Donskoy Monastery, 10 February 1913
- Born: Sergei Mikhailovich Trufanov; October 19, 1880; Stanitsa Mariinskaya, Don Host Oblast, Russian Empire
- Died: January 26, 1952 (aged 71); New York City, New York
- Occupations: Monk, Author, Janitor

Sergei Michailovich Trufanov (Russian: Серге́й Миха́йлович Труфа́нов; formerly Hieromonk Iliodor or Hieromonk Heliodorus, Russian: Иеромонах Илиодор; October 19, 1880 – 26 January 1952) was a lapsed hieromonk, a charismatic preacher, an enfant terrible of the Russian Orthodox church, panslavist, and actor.

He is known primarily for his semi-autobiographical book about Rasputin. In this work he was supported by Maxim Gorky, since 1902 a friend of Lenin. Gorky hoped that Trufanov's story on Rasputin would discredit the Tsar's family and eventually contribute to the revolutionary propaganda.

== Biography ==
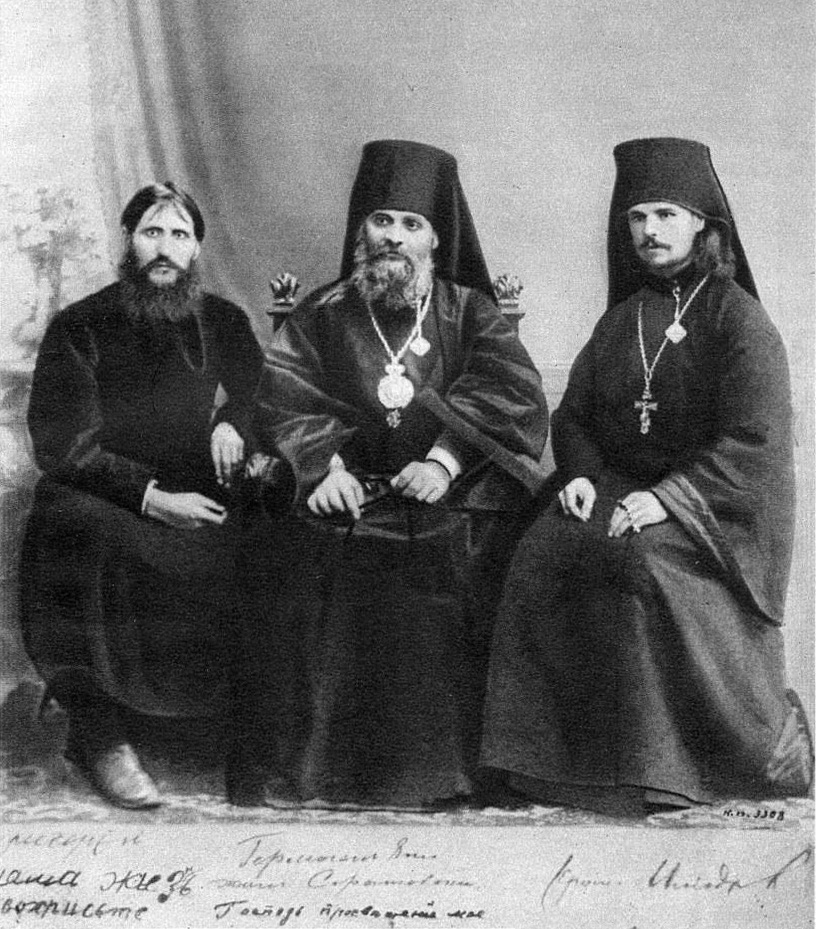
Rasputin, Hermogen and Iliodor next to each other in 1906. In 1912 Alexandra ordered Hermogen to be banished to a monastery after he beat Rasputin with a crucifix; Iliodor went into exile after the attack by Khioniya Guseva in June 1914.

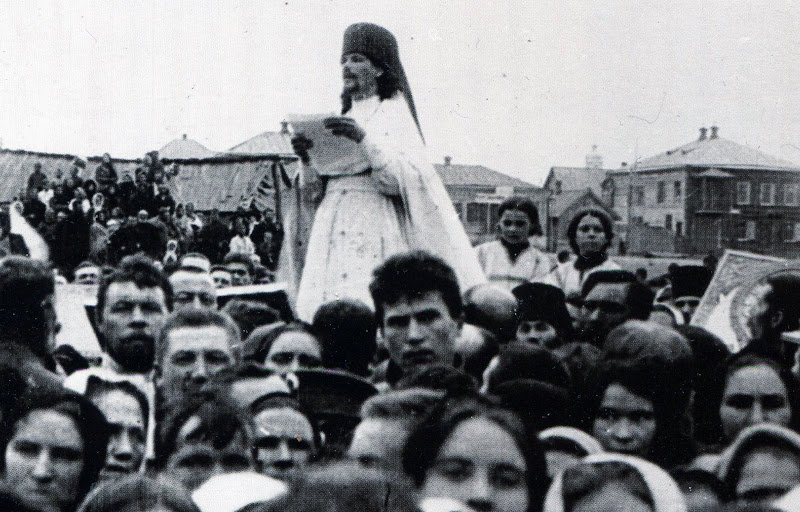
Iliodor during a procession in 1910

Sergei Trufanov was born in stanitsa Mariinskaya and grew up in a small cottage near the Don river as the son of a local deacon. He was one of thirteen children; according to himself five died young of starvation. At the age of ten he went to school in Novocherkassk. At the age of 15 he entered the local theological seminary. Five years later he graduated and went to the capital to attend the St. Petersburg Theological Academy.

In 1903 he was ordained a hieromonk under the name Iliodor; two years later he graduated from the academy. There he met Father Gapon. Iliodor worked with the poor and expected that the clergy, not the revolutionaries could change the country. He was discovered by Theofan of Poltava and met Rasputin. Iliodor was appointed a lecturer at the seminary in Jaroslavl, but returned to the capital within a year. He was invited to the Peterhof Palace but scandalized his audience in a sermon, defending a land reform, which should be ordered by the Tsar. The Russian aristocrats and the Most Holy Synod were shocked with his behavior. The Synod decided to ban Iliodor, but Rasputin and the Tsar defended him. Instead Iliodor moved to Volhynia and lived in Pochayiv Lavra, the center of Panslavism. In a paper he attacked the revolutionaries and the Jews. According to himself Iliodor turned against the right-wing Union of the Russian People and the Black Hundreds movement, because they believed in the Tsar's autocracy.

He gained notoriety for attacking the prime-minister Pyotr Stolypin, industrialists, and local politicians. Then he was prohibited to preach by the Most Holy Synod. In 1908 he was rescued by Bishop Hermogen and appointed in Tsaritsyn, where the URP had founded its first branch and Iliodor gathered huge crowds. Iliodor created Holy Spirit Monastery in 1909. In the year after he was forbidden to preach any longer and exiled to Minsk. He was invited to Tsarskoye Selo to meet with the Tsarina; not in the Alexander Palace, but in the house of Anna Vyrubova. Iliodor was allowed to go back to Tsaritsyn on request of Rasputin. Stolypin demanded Iliodor had to be banned to Novosil, and the Tsar agreed, but the abbot escaped and went back to Tsaritsyn.

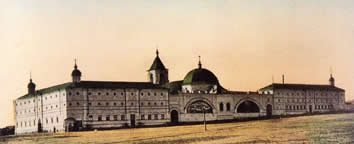
Svyato-Duhov Monastery in Tsaritsyn, built within a year and like a fortress

== Rasputin ==
In 1909 Iliodor and Grigori Rasputin visited his village by train. Iliodor began to wonder if Rasputin was a devil or a saint, but defended him against attacks in the press in 1910. In early 1911 Rasputin traveled to the Holy Land. On his way back he visited Tsaritsyn. Iliodor had been invited by the Tsar on 21 May, who asked him not to attack his ministers, but the revolutionaries and the Jews. Five days later Iliodor was promoted and became archimandrite. In December 1911 Hermogenes and Iliodor came into conflict with Rasputin, who liked to touch and kiss and had almost free access to the Imperial family. After having been beaten by Hermogen, in a monastery on Vasilyevsky Island, Rasputin complained to the Imperial couple.

Iliodor started a slander and blackmail campaign against Rasputin. Hinting that Alexandra and Rasputin were lovers, he showed Makarov a satchel of letters, one written by the Tsarina and four by her daughters. The given or stolen letters were handed to the Tsar.

In 1912, Iliodor renounced the Russian Orthodox Church, published an apology to Jews, and was defrocked. His monastery was closed; he was banned to the Frolishi monastery in the Volodarsky District, Nizhny Novgorod Oblast. He seems to have escaped to Peter Badmayev in St Petersburg.

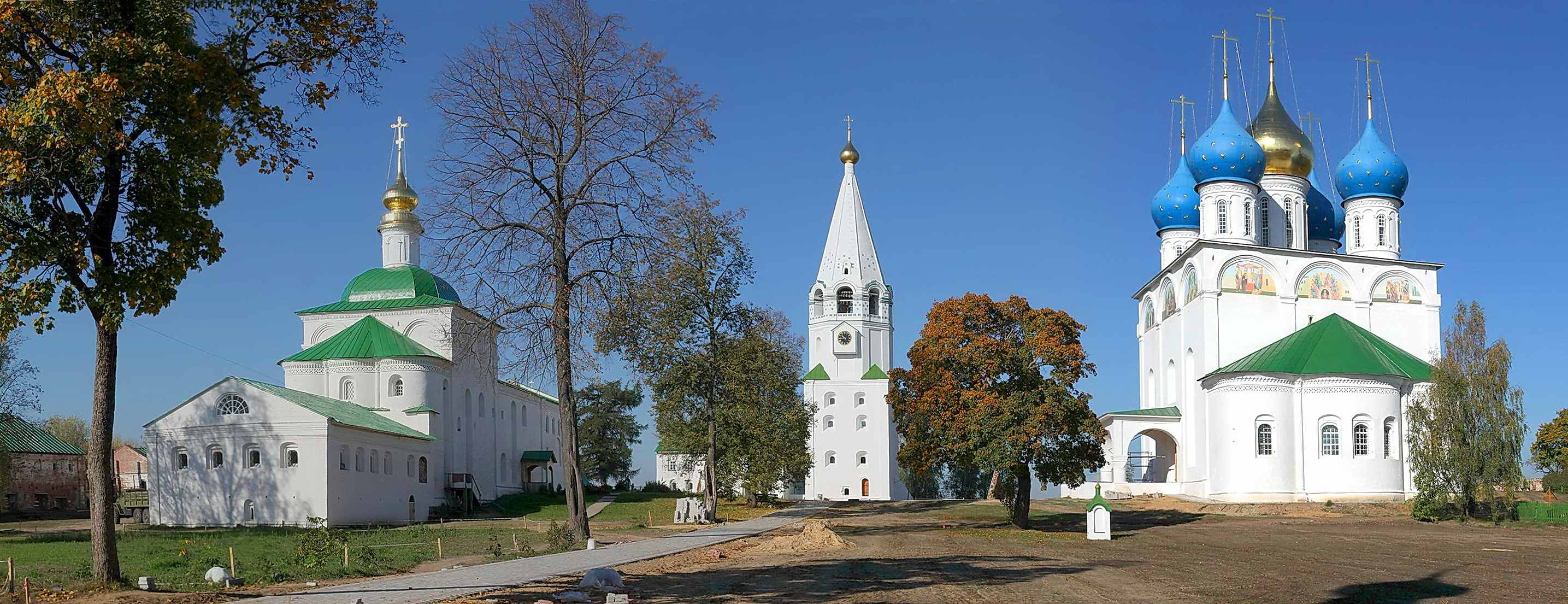
Frolishi monastery

In Summer 1914, after an attack on Rasputin by Khioniya Guseva, he fled all the way around the Gulf of Bothnia to Christiania (present-day Oslo), Norway with the help of Grand Duke Nicholas and Maxim Gorki. Rasputin believed Iliodor and Vladimir Dzhunkovsky had organized the attack. Guseva, a fanatically religious woman, had been his adherent in earlier years and denied Iliodor's participation, declaring that she attempted to kill Rasputin because he was spreading temptation among the innocent.

Most of Rasputin's enemies had by now disappeared. Stolypin was dead, Count Kokovtsov fallen from power, Theofan of Poltava exiled, Bishop Hermogen illegally banished and Iliodor in hiding.

Together with Alexei Khvostov he concocted a plan to kill Rasputin early 1916. Then Iliodor tried to bribe the Tsarina with publishing his book on Rasputin. In June 1916 he sailed to New York.

== After the Revolution ==
In the lost silent film The Fall of the Romanoffs (1917), Iliodor played himself. In the following year he published his book. Casimir Pilenas, in his correspondence with the American Jewish Committee, claimed to be his "agent". In 1918, he returned to Soviet Russia, offering his services to Lenin, and lived for several years in Tsaritsyn. In early 1919 he reportedly applied for work in the government of the Ukrainian People's Republic, claiming his support for the Directorate. In 1922 he took his family to NYC, where he became a Baptist and worked as a janitor in the Metropolitan Life Insurance Tower, and spent the remainder of his life in New York City.

== Works ==
- Mad Monk of Russia, Iliodor: Memoirs and Confessions of Sergei Michailovich Trufanoff, Iliodor New York: Century Co., 1918

== Sources ==
- Simon Dixon (2010) The 'Mad Monk' Iliodor in Tsaritsyn. The Slavonic and East European Review. Vol. 88, No. 1/2, Personality and Place in Russian Culture (January/April 2010), pp. 377–415. Modern Humanities Research Association.
- Fuhrmann, Joseph T. (2013). Rasputin, the untold story (illustrated ed.). Hoboken, New Jersey: John Wiley & Sons, Inc. p. 314. ISBN 978-1-118-17276-6.
- Greg King (1994) The Last Empress. The Life & Times of Alexandra Feodorovna, tsarina of Russia. A Birch Lane Press Book.
- Ronald C. Moe, Prelude to the Revolution: The Murder of Rasputin (Aventine Press, 2011).
- Radzinsky, Edvard (2000). Rasputin: The Last Word. St Leonards, New South Wales, Australia: Allen & Unwin. p. 704. ISBN 1-86508-529-4. OCLC 155418190. Originally in London: Weidenfeld & Nicolson.
- Margarita Nelipa (2010) The Murder of Grigorii Rasputin. A Conspiracy That Brought Down the Russian Empire, Gilbert's Books. ISBN 978-0-9865310-1-9.
- Bernard Pares (1939) The Fall of the Russian Monarchy. A Study of the Evidence. Jonathan Cape. London.
