= Husiev =

Husiev or Husyev (Ukrainian: Гусєв), feminine: Husieva or Husyeva (Ukrainian: Гусєва), is a Ukrainian-language surname. Russian counterpart: Gusev. Notable people with the surname include:

- Iryna Husieva (born 1987), Ukrainian judoka
- Oleh Husiev (born 1983), Ukrainian footballer
- Oleksiy Husyev (born 2005), Ukrainian footballer
- Serhiy Husyev (born 1967), Ukrainian footballer
