= Gusev (inhabited locality) =

Gusev (Russian: Гусев; masculine) or Guseva (Гусева; feminine) is the name of several inhabited localities in Russia.

== Modern localities ==
Urban localities

- Gusev, Kaliningrad Oblast, a town in Gusevsky District of Kaliningrad Oblast

Rural localities

- Gusev, Belgorod Oblast, a khutor in Grushevsky Rural Okrug of Volokonovsky District in Belgorod Oblast
- Gusev, Dmitrovsky District, Oryol Oblast, a settlement in Borodinsky Selsoviet of Dmitrovsky District in Oryol Oblast
- Gusev, Korsakovsky District, Oryol Oblast, a settlement in Paramonovsky Selsoviet of Korsakovsky District in Oryol Oblast
- Gusev, Chertkovsky District, Rostov Oblast, a khutor in Mankovskoye Rural Settlement of Chertkovsky District in Rostov Oblast
- Gusev, Kamensky District, Rostov Oblast, a khutor in Gusevskoye Rural Settlement of Kamensky District in Rostov Oblast
- Guseva, Irkutsk Oblast, a farmstead in Cheremkhovsky District of Irkutsk Oblast
- Guseva, Sverdlovsk Oblast, a village in Malobrusyansky Selsoviet of Beloyarsky District in Sverdlovsk Oblast

== Alternative names ==
- Gusev, alternative name of Gusevo, a village in Bolsheorshinsky Rural Okrug of Orshansky District in the Mari El Republic; 56°57′N 47°45′E
- Guseva, alternative name of Gusevo, a village in Yaropoletskoye Rural Settlement of Volokolamsky District in Moscow Oblast; 56°6′N 35°50′E
