= Oleg Andreyevich Gusev =

Russian entrepreneur from Urals

Oleg Gusev
- Оле́г Андре́евич Гу́сев
- Born: Oleg Andreyevich Gusev; April 3, 1964 (age 62); Chelyabinsk, Russia
- Education: Ural State Technical University (electrical engineering, 1986); Ural State University of Economics (finances, 1997)
- Occupation: Chairman of Ural Financial Holding (several other positions in the past)
- Website: www.oagusev.ru

Oleg Andreyevich Gusev (Russian: Олег Андреевич Гусев; born 3 March 1964) is a Russian entrepreneur and politician from the Urals area of Russia. He is currently the head of Ural Financial Holding enterprise, based in Ekaterinburg, and involved in massive land development projects and other large businesses. Formerly he also was a member of regional government ranking up to vice prime minister.

Gusev is also known as an arts collector, and possesses paintings of Picasso, Chagall, Kandinsky, Salvador Dalí, Matisse, Warhol and others.

== Biography and career ==
Oleg Andreyevich Gusev was born in Chelyabinsk on April 3, 1964.

He graduated from Ural State Technical University in 1986 as electrical engineer. In 1997 got a second degree in finances at Ural State University of Economics.

He worked at the Kalinin Machine-Building Plant until early 1990s.

In 1993-1998 was participating in creation of, and furtherly headed, the major Zoloto Platina Bank.

In the course of the career, for various periods of time, Gusev also held multiple major positions in a number of financial institutions of Urals and Moscow. Particularly, he owned a Chelyabinsk-based bank called Monetny Dom ("coin house"), which he sold by 2010.

=== Ural Financial Holding ===
From early 2000s he began to work for Ural Financial Holding, a major investment enterprise involved in land development, construction, heavy industries, agriculture, researches.

The Ural Financial Holding is supporting Ekaterinburg Opera Theatre and Demidov Science Fund.

== Culture and charities ==
In 1997 he founded personal charity fund "Good for the people".

Nowadays he is also known as an arts collector: he possesses paintings of Picasso, Chagall, Kandinsky, Salvador Dalí, Matisse, Warhol and others. Sometimes he organizes exhibits of the paintings for public display in Urals.

The Ural Financial Holding is supporting Ekaterinburg Opera Theatre and Demidov Science Fund.
