= Diary of Nicholas II =

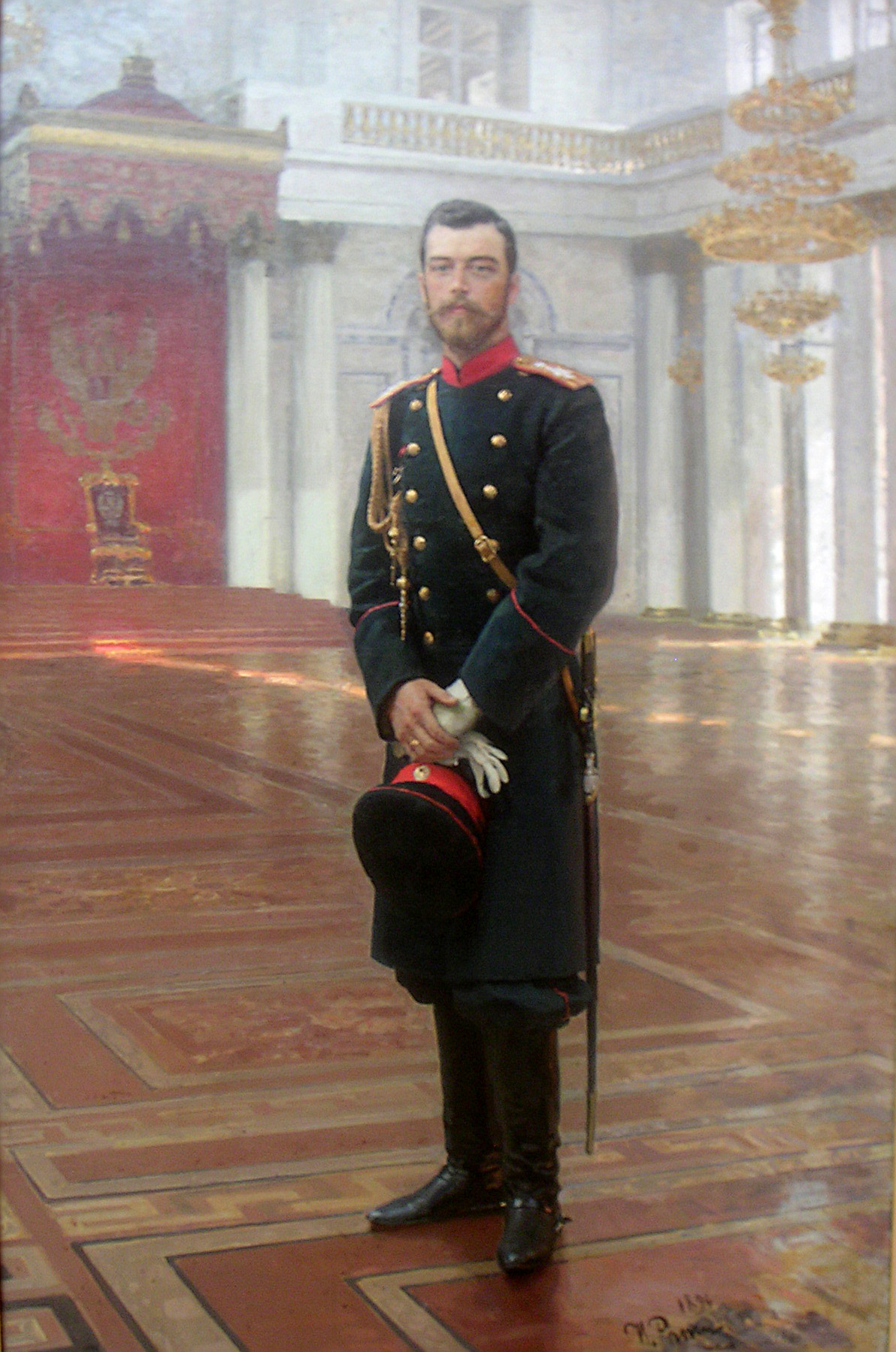
Nicolas II of Russia by Iliya Repin

Nicholas II began keeping a diary at the age of 14. The archive (the manuscript originals are in the so-called Novoromanovsky Archive) contains 51 volumes of notebooks - the original diary for 1882-1918. The personal diaries of Nicholas II are kept in Fond 601 of the State Archive of the Russian Federation.

The publication of extracts from Nicholas II's diaries began simultaneously in Pravda and Izvestiya VTsIK shortly after the murder of the Romanov family on 9 August 1918.

He started writing in the Gatchina Palace in 1882. The last entry is dated 30 June 1918 in the old style.

In 1965, a portion of Nicholas' journals from 1917 and 1918, were translated into English.

== See also ==
- Queen Victoria's journals
