= Nina Guseva =

Russian actress, documentary filmmaker and visual artist

- Нина Гусева
- Born: 1988 (age 37–38); Moscow, Soviet Union
- Education: Moscow Art Theatre School; Marina Razbezhkina School of Documentary Film; Le Fresnoy – Studio national des arts contemporains
- Occupations: actress; documentary filmmaker; visual artist
- Years active: 2011–present

Nina Guseva (Russian: Нина Гусева; born 1988) is a Russian actress, documentary filmmaker, and visual artist based in Berlin. She began her career as a theatre and film actress at the Moscow Art Theatre, then transitioned to documentary filmmaking and visual art. Her debut feature documentary The Case (2021) had its world premiere at the International Documentary Film Festival Amsterdam (IDFA). Since 2022, she has been based in Berlin and has studied at Le Fresnoy – Studio national des arts contemporains in France. In 2026, she co-created the visual design for Wozzeck: Wretches Like Us at the Southbank Centre in London.

== Early life and education ==
Guseva was born in 1988 in Moscow, Soviet Union. She trained as an actress at the Moscow Art Theatre School, studying in the course led by director Dmitry Brusnikin. She graduated with honours in 2011.

Between 2019 and 2021, she studied documentary filmmaking at Marina Razbezhkina's School of Documentary Film in Moscow, one of Russia's most prominent schools for documentary cinema.

She left Russia in 2022 following the invasion of Ukraine and relocated to Berlin. Between 2023 and 2025, she studied at Le Fresnoy – Studio national des arts contemporains in Tourcoing, France (promotion Vera Molnár), one of Europe's foremost institutions for contemporary art and experimental cinema.

== Career ==
=== Acting ===
After graduating from the Moscow Art Theatre School in 2011, Guseva joined the company of the Moscow Art Theatre (MKhAT), where she performed in both classical and contemporary productions in leading roles until 2022. She also worked in film during this period, with credits including the films Psikh and Beach House.

=== Documentary filmmaking ===
Guseva directed her first short documentary, Rosa, in 2019, while studying at Marina Razbezhkina's School of Documentary Film.

Her debut feature documentary, The Case (Delo, 2021, 76 min.), had its world premiere at IDFA 2021 in the Frontlight section. The film follows lawyer Maria Eismont as she works to defend the imprisoned activist Konstantin Kotov, arrested during the Moscow protests of July 2019 against electoral restrictions. Guseva also served as the film's cinematographer. The film was produced by Sergei Yahontov for Stereotactic, in co-production with Marina Razbezhkina Studio. It won one award and received two further nominations on the international festival circuit.

At Le Fresnoy, Guseva produced the short documentary film Temps d'attente (Waiting Time, 2024, 26 min.), which was presented as part of the institution's annual Panorama 26 exhibition (September 2024 – January 2025). The film, made with artistic mentorship from filmmaker Véréna Paravel, observes queues at bus stops in Russia as a reflection on social paralysis, immobility, and the erosion of individual agency under authoritarian conditions.

=== Visual art and performance ===
In April 2026, Guseva served as visual co-creator alongside video designer Ilya Shagalov on Wozzeck: Wretches Like Us, a concert staging of Alban Berg's Wozzeck performed by the London Philharmonic Orchestra, conducted by Edward Gardner, at the Royal Festival Hall as part of the Southbank Centre's Multitudes festival. The production used a large-scale sequence of projected still images — reframing the opera's story through the lens of a contemporary British social realism. Opera Today described the photographic element as "edgy reportage heightened by digitally manipulated surrealism", noting that Guseva brought to the collaboration a background that "began on the stage but shifted to making documentaries."

The production received broad coverage in the British press, including five stars from The Times and four stars from The Guardian, the Financial Times, and Bachtrack.

== Filmography ==
=== As actress (selected) ===
- Psikh (film)
- Beach House (film)
- Various productions at the Moscow Art Theatre, 2011–2022
