= Dmitry Sergeyevich Gusev =

Red army senior lieutenant

- Дмитрий Сергеевич Гусев
- Born: 15 February 1915; Tyukovka, Novokhopyorsky Uyezd, Voronezh Governorate, Russian Empire
- Died: 2 June 1989 (aged 74); Volgograd, Soviet Union
- Military career
- Allegiance: Soviet Union
- Branch: Red Army
- Service years: 1942–1946
- Rank: Senior lieutenant
- Unit: 134th Rifle Division
- Conflicts: World War II; Lublin-Brest Offensive
- Awards: Hero of the Soviet Union

Dmitry Sergeyevich Gusev (Russian: Дми́трий Серге́евич Гу́сев; 15 February 1915 – 2 June 1989) was a Red Army senior lieutenant who was awarded the title Hero of the Soviet Union and the Order of Lenin for his actions during the Lublin–Brest Offensive. At the time of the action, he was a platoon commander in the 134th Rifle Division.

== Early life ==
Dmitry Sergeyevich Gusev was born on 15 February 1915 in the village of Tyukovka in Novochopersk Uyezd of Voronezh Governorate to a peasant family. He graduated from five grades. He moved to Krasnoyarsk and became an electrician.

== World War II ==
On 15 December 1942, he was drafted into the Red Army. He was sent to the 23rd Guards Airborne Regiment of the 9th Guards Airborne Division. Gusev received his baptism of fire in the Staraya-Russa Offensive and was wounded during the fighting on 15 March. After recovering, he graduated from the School of Sergeants in the Moscow Military District. Gusev became commander of a machine gun platoon in the 10th Guards Airborne Division's 24th Guards Airborne Regiment. He fought in the crossing of the Dnieper and the battles for the bridgehead at Mishurin Rog during September. In November, Gusev was sent to take courses for 69th Army junior lieutenants. After the completion of the course in March 1944, he received a promotion to junior lieutenant and became a machine gun platoon commander of the 629th Rifle Regiment of the 134th Rifle Division. He also joined the Communist Party of the Soviet Union around this time.

The division fought in the Lublin-Brest Offensive. On 20 July, Gusev advanced two machine guns to the banks of the Bug River under heavy artillery fire and made possible the crossing of the river with his platoon's fire. After crossing the river, Gusev brought his machine guns to the other bank and reportedly helped repulse five counterattacks. While repulsing one counterattack, Gusev reportedly destroyed a machine gun and killed ten German soldiers. During the expansion of the bridgehead, Gusev organized his platoon's machine guns to support the advance, allowing for the speedy capture of the forward German trenches. During the day, Gusev's machine gun platoon reportedly killed 35 German soldiers. For his actions in this battle, Gusev was awarded the Order of the Patriotic War 2nd class on 5 August.

The division continued to advance and reached the Vistula by 29 July. Despite heavy German artillery fire, Gusev led his platoon across the Vistula. He then led his platoon into the battle for the expansion of what became known as the Puławy bridgehead. In conjunction with two rifle companies, Gusev's platoon captured the village of Lyutsimya from German troops. Gusev then prepared his platoon in positions to repulse counterattacks. The platoon reportedly repulsed 15 German counterattacks, reportedly killing more than 100 German soldiers and destroying up to 15 firing points. For his actions, Gusev was awarded the title Hero of the Soviet Union and the Order of Lenin on 24 March 1945.

The division fought to hold the Puławy bridgehead for the next few months. In January 1945, the division launched the Warsaw-Poznan Offensive of the Vistula–Oder Offensive from the bridgehead. On 14 January, Gusev's platoon attacked west from the bridgehead and captured the village of Paenkuv. They then advanced along the highway to Radom, which was captured soon after. During the subsequent fighting on the Poznań approaches and the Warta crossing, the platoon reportedly killed 250 German soldiers with its machine guns. The division then advanced to the Oder at Frankfurt am Oder. While attacking across the Grosser See lake, machine gun fire was used to facilitate the 629th Rifle Regiment's advance, allowing the reduction of German defences on the lake's western shore. For his actions during the offensive, Gusev was awarded the Order of the Red Banner on 8 June.

The division then fought in the Berlin Offensive. It advanced from the Kustrin bridgehead and fought in the destruction of German units surrounded southeast of Berlin. On 22 April, Gusev led his platoon in repulsing two German counterattacks near the village of Wilmersdorf. His platoon reportedly killed 70 German soldiers. Gusev was seriously wounded in this battle but reportedly did not leave the battlefield. For his leadership, Gusev was awarded a second Order of the Red Banner on 18 June.

== Postwar ==
In 1946, Gusev was discharged as a senior lieutenant. He lived in Volgograd and was awarded the Order of the Patriotic War 2nd class for the 40th anniversary of the end of World War II on 11 March 1985. Gusev died in 1987 at the age of 72.
