= Theophan Bystrov =

Russian archbishop and theologian (1875–1940)

Vladyka Theophan of Poltava
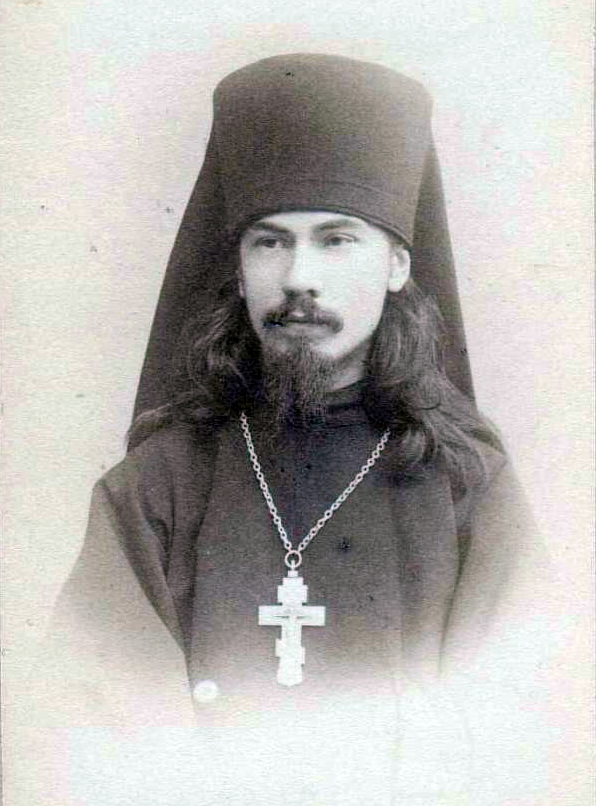
- Archimandrite Theophan between 1898 and 1901
- Born: Vassili Dimitrievich Bystrov; 12 January 1875; Podmoshie
- Died: 6 February 1940 (aged 65); Limeray, France
- Occupations: Archbishop and theologian
- Theological work
- Language: Russian

Theophan of Poltava (born Vassili Dimitrievich Bystrov, Russian: Василий Дмитриевич Быстров; 12 January 1875 – 6 February 1940) was a Russian archbishop and theologian in the Eastern Orthodox Church. He was widely known as the "only Russian ascetic bishop". Theophan was the occasional confessor of Tsar Nicholas II of Russia and his wife Alexandra.

== Early years ==
Basil was born in Luzhsky Uyezd (now Shimsky District) as the son of a priest and baptized on the day of St. Basil the Great. In 1896 he finished his studies at St Petersburg Theological Academy, which he had entered as one of the youngest students. The year after he became assistant-professor in history of the Old Testament. In 1898 he became a monk under the name of Theophanes the Confessor; in 1901 archimandrite.

In the summer of 1902, a student at the Ecclesiastical Academy named Leonid Feodorov approached Archimandrite Theophan seeking permission to interrupt his studies for the priesthood and be granted a passport for a foreign trip to Rome. Feodorov was already known to be discreetly attending the Tridentine Mass at St. Catherine's Church on Nevsky Prospect and his teachers had already taken to calling Feodorov, "our Catholic."

Despite knowing that Feodorov intended to openly convert from the Russian Orthodox Church to Roman Catholicism, Archimandrite Theophan chose, instead of reporting Feodorov to the Okhrana, to tell him, "I know very well why you wish to go to Italy... So be it, and may God keep you." Fr. Cyril Korolevsky alleges that Archimandrite Theophan, "was quite convinced of the truth of Catholicism, but like a number of others he could not bring himself to take the definite step." In reality, Archimandrite Theophan remained Orthodox even after the October Revolution, when he lived as a refugee in Bulgaria and France.

== Priest and bishop ==
In 1905, Archimandrite Theophan received his master's degree on the Tetragrammaton. He was friendly with Grigory Rasputin, "who amazed us all with his psychological perspicacity", and invited him to his apartment. Theofan introduced Rasputin to the Grand Duchess Milica of Montenegro, who in her turn introduced him to the Imperial couple on 1 November 1905 (O.S.).

Two weeks later Theophan was invited and became their spiritual guide. In 1908 Theophan (and brother Makary) visited Rasputin in his home village Pokrovskoye and investigated his supposed Khlyst behavior, after charges made the year before.

In 1901 Theofan had already become inspector, in 1909 he was appointed rector of the St Petersburg Theological Academy. Theophan was a devout monarchist and came to the conclusion Rasputin was a garrulous person, a false starets and could be a danger to the throne. Theophan and Rasputin became enemies. In 1910 Theophan moved to the Crimea, because of his health. He was appointed bishop of the eparchy of Simferopol and at the same time elected as an honorary member of the St Petersburg Theological Academy. In 1911 Hermogenes, Iliodor and Theophan were banned due to a conflict with Rasputin and Alexandra Fyodorovna.

In 1912 Theofan was appointed as bishop in Astrakhan, but his health got worse; in March 1913 he was created bishop in Poltava. After the February Revolution, he lived from 1917 to 1918 in Moscow and testified under oath about his memories of both Rasputin and the Tsarina. He also became involved in local politics.

== Refugee ==
In 1919 he was evacuated by the White army to Sevastopol. In 1920 he emigrated to Constantinople. From there he moved to Petkovica monastery in Serbia, and to Sofia and Varna in Bulgaria.

Despite his many desperate efforts to expose Rasputin's manipulative nature to the last Tsar and Empress, Theofan was unable to forgive himself for having introduced his former protege to the Imperial family. Blaming himself for the overthrow of the House of Romanov, the October Revolution, and the subsequent Red Terror, Theofan spent many nights lying prostrate before the altar of St. Alexander Nevsky Cathedral in Sofia, "wailing about his guilt" and imploring God's forgiveness. This continued until 1931, when Theofan was temporarily confined to a mental institution.

From 1931, Theophan lived in Clamart and in Mosnes (in France), leading the life of a hermit.

== Literature ==
- Таушев, Аверкий (1974). Высокопреосвященный Феофан, Архиепископ Полтавский и Переяславский: к столетию со дня рождения: 1872–1972 гг. Jordanville: Holy Trinity monastery.
- Воронов, Ливерий (1990). "Преосвященный Феофан (Быстров) — ректор Санкт-Петербургской духовной академии (1909–1910)". Вестник Ленинградской духовной академии (1): 18–31.
- Бэттс, Ричард; Марченко, Вячеслав (1994). Духовник царской семьи Святитель Феофан Полтавский (1874–1940). Подвижник благочестия XX века. Moscow: Российские отделение Валаамского общества Америки.
  - Бэттс, Ричард; Марченко, Вячеслав (2010). Духовник царской семьи. Архиепископ Феофан Полтавский, Новый Затворник (PDF). Moscow: Danilovsky Blagovestnik.
- Болонников, Александр (2006). "Архиепископ Феофан (Быстров). Жизнь как подвиг". Труды Минской духовной академии (4): 71–93.
- Добыкин, Дмитрий (2013). "Архиепископ Феофан (Быстров) и его исследования имени Божьего". Таврические Духовные чтения. Материалы международной научно-практической конференции к 140-летию открытия Таврической духовной семинарии. Симферополь: 18–33.
- Семенков, Вадим (2019). "Архиепископ Феофан (Быстров) об употреблении тетраграммы в библейских ветхозаветных книгах". От познания языка — к познанию мира: философские и психолого-педагогические аспекты языкознания. сборник материалов Международного круглого стола. Санкт-Петербург: 186–196.
- Шукуров, Дмитрий (2019). "Толкования библейского богооткровенного имени в трудах Епископа Иоанна (Соколова) и В. С. Соловьева в оценке Архиепископа Феофана (Быстрова)". Соловьёвские исследования (3 (63)): 121–137.
- Печерин, Андрей; Салимова, Наталья (2023). "Обретение честных останков архиепископа Феофана (Быстрова): историко-хронологический и юридический аспекты". Православие на Урале: связь времён (1 (14)): 85–92.
