= Khioniya Guseva =

Russian assassin

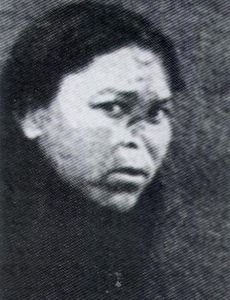
- Guseva, c. 1914
- Born: c. 1880/81; Simbirsk, Russia
- Died: after 1919 (aged at least 38-39)
- Occupation: Assassin
- Years active: 1914
- Known for: Attempted murder of Grigori Rasputin in 1914

Khioniya Kuzminichna Guseva (c. 1880/81 – after 1919; her first name has alternatively been spelled as Khionia or Jina or Chionya, and her surname has been alternatively spelled as Gusyeva) was a Russian townswoman (meshchanka) of Syzran (near Simbirsk) who attempted to kill Grigori Rasputin in 1914.

== Biography ==
In 1899, she is recorded as having resided in Tsaritsyn, known presently as Volgograd. Until 1912, she was a devotee of the monk Iliodor.

According to the records of the Extraordinary Investigative Commission of the Provisional Government (ru), Khioniya Guseva was a peasant of Syzransky Uyezd of the Simbirsk Governorate. The dates of Guseva's birth and death are unknown, but the police report indicates that she was 33 years old when she tried to assassinate Rasputin.

Her most noticeable feature was her lack of a nose. During her testimony, she indicated that she never suffered from syphilis, but rather was "damaged by medicines" since she was 13 years old.

=== Assassination attempt on Rasputin ===
Around 21 June she arrived in the village of Pokrovskoye and on 29 June (or 17 June [O.S. 4 June] 1914) she attempted to assassinate Grigori Rasputin. (According to historian Oleg Platonov, the assassination attempt was made on Sunday, June 29 [O.S].)

Grigori Rasputin, a friend of the Tsar Nicholas II and his family, was visiting his wife and children in Siberia. In the afternoon of Monday, around 3 o'clock, he went out from the house. He had received a telegram from the tsarina about the threat of the war. When he left his home to reply to it he was attacked by Guseva, who drove a dagger into his abdomen (mesentery). Guseva purportedly screamed "I have killed the Antichrist!" after the attack. Rasputin was then chased through the streets by Guseva in order to finish the task. He hit her in the face with a shaft, and a crowd quickly gathered, chanting "Let's kill her!" She then surrendered herself to the constable and attempted to commit suicide in the days after.

On Thursday Rasputin was transported by steamer to Tyumen, accompanied by his wife and daughter. The tsar sent his own physician, Roman Vreden, and after a laparotomy and almost seven weeks, Rasputin recovered; he was taken home on 17 August. In the meantime Iliodor had escaped to Oslo.

Guseva was tried in court, found to be insane and placed in an asylum in Tomsk. On 15 March 1917, she was released by order of Alexander Kerensky. She is reported to have attempted and failed another assassination attempt, this time of Patriarch Tikhon of Moscow, in 1919. What happened to Guseva after this attempt is unknown and her date of death is also unknown.

== Sources ==
- Joseph T. Fuhrmann, Rasputin: A Life (New York: Praeger, 1990).
- Edvard Radzinsky, The Rasputin File (2000, Anchor, USA) ISBN 0-385-48910-2 (paperback)
