= Butovo firing range =

Execution site of the Soviet secret police

Butovo Firing Range
- Бутовский полигон
- Interactive map of Butovo Firing Range

Details
- Established: 8 August 1937
- Location: Drozhzhino, Leninsky District, Moscow Oblast
- Country: Russia
- Coordinates: 55°31′52″N 37°35′41″E
- Type: Mass grave
- Owned by: Russian Orthodox Church

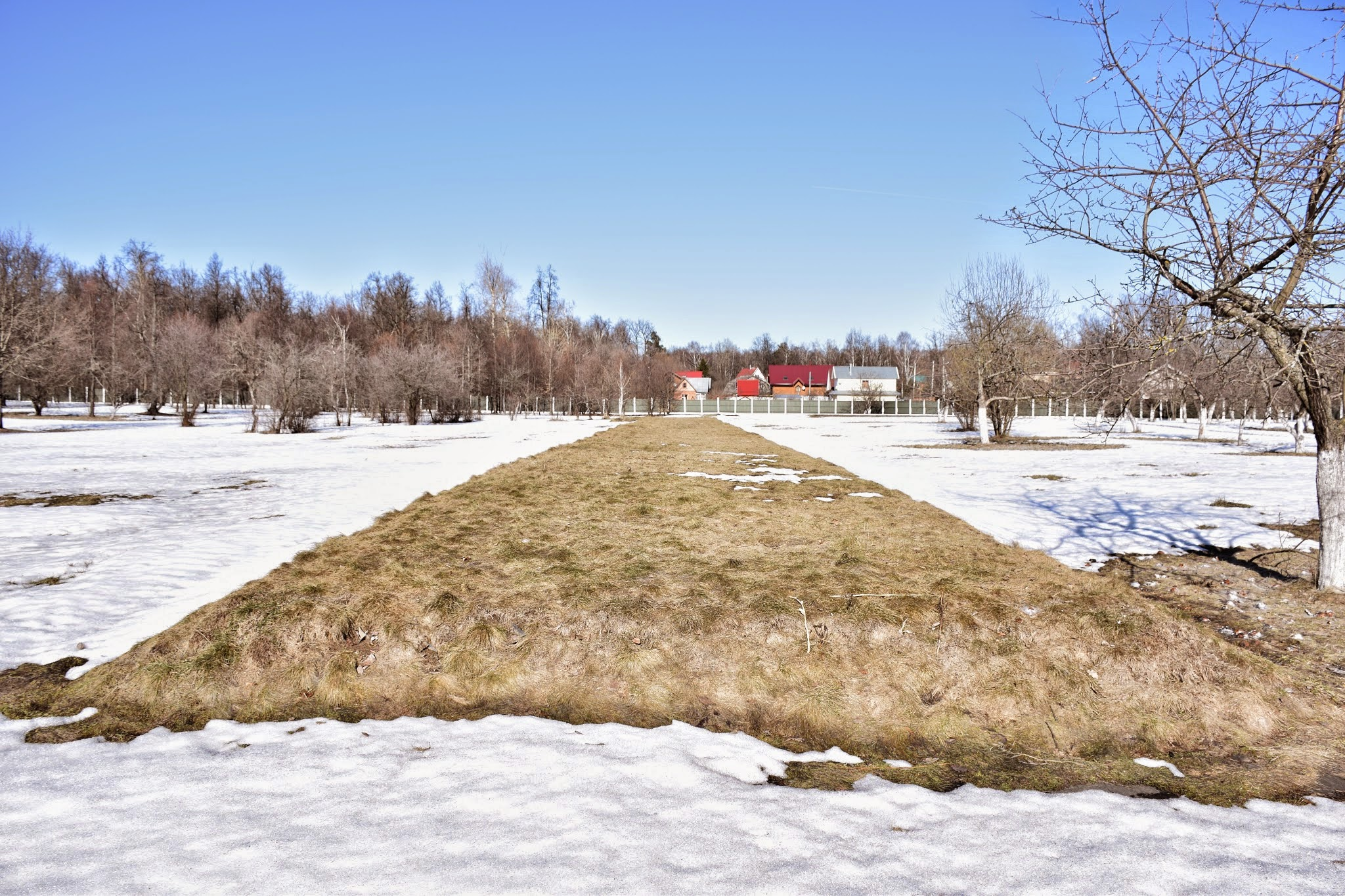
Mound covering one of the mass graves at Butovo.

The Butovo Shooting Site often mistakenly called Butovo Firing Range (Russian: Бутовский полигон, romanized: Butovskiy poligon) was an execution site of the Soviet secret police located near Drozhzhino in Leninsky District, Moscow Oblast from 1938 to 1953. Its use for mass execution has been documented; it was prepared as a site for mass burial. According to Arseny Roginsky, "firing range" was a popular euphemism adopted to describe the mysterious and closely-guarded plots of land that the NKVD began to set aside for mass burials on the eve of the Great Terror.

Butovo was used for mass executions and mass graves during Joseph Stalin's Great Purge, with 20,761 prisoners of various nationalities documented as being transported to the site and executed by the NKVD and its successor agencies. The exact number of victims executed at Butovo remains unknown as only fragmentary data has been declassified. Notable victims at Butovo include Gustav Klutsis, Seraphim Chichagov and Saul Bron; in addition, more than 1000 members of the Russian Orthodox clergy.

The Russian Orthodox Church took over the ownership of Butovo in 1995, commissioning construction of a large Russian Revival memorial church, and the mass grave memorial complex can be visited daily.

== History ==
Butovo is first mentioned in historical texts in 1568 as owned by Fyodor Drozhin, a boyar of Ivan the Terrible, and the area south of Moscow was occupied by the small settlement of Kosmodemyanskoye Drozhino (named after Saints Cosmas and Damian) until the 19th century. In 1889, the estate's owner, N.M. Solovov, turned it into a large stud farm with stables and a racetrack. His descendant, I.I. Zimin, donated the farm to the Bolsheviks in the aftermath of the October Revolution in exchange for the right to flee the country, and the farm then became the property of the Red Army. In the 1920s, the Red Army ceded the site, now officially named Butovo after a nearby town, to the OGPU, the secret police of the Soviet Union, as an agricultural colony. In 1934, after the OGPU was incorporated into the NKVD, a portion of the property was encircled by a high fence and transformed into a small firing range.

== The Great Terror (1937–1938) ==
On 31 July 1937, the NKVD issued Decree No. 00447 "On the operation of repressing former kulaks, criminals and other anti-Soviet elements." and the political repression that followed resulted in large death sentence and execution quotas. Local cemeteries in Moscow were unable to accommodate the sheer volume of purge victims executed in area prisons. To address the issue, the NKVD allocated two new special facilities – Butovo and Kommunarka shooting ground – to serve as a combination of execution site and mass grave.

On 8 August 1937, the first 91 victims were transported to Butovo from Moscow prisons. Over the next 14 months, 20,761 were executed and subsequently buried at the site, with another 10,000 to 14,000 shot and buried at the nearby Kommunarka Firing Range located 5 miles (8.0 km) to the northwest. On average, 50 persons were executed per day during the Great Purge, and some days saw no executions, while on others hundreds were shot. Records indicate the busiest day was on 28 February 1938 when 562 people were executed.

The last 52 victims of Stalin's purges were executed at Butovo on 19 October 1938. After 1938, Butovo was no longer used as a mass execution site, but continued to be used for the burial of those executed in Moscow prisons. A German prisoner of war camp was established near Butovo during World War II, and prisoners were used as forced labour to build the Warsaw Highway. Those who were too ill or exhausted to work were shot and thrown into the Butovo ditches. The commandant's office was located just 100 meters from the funerary ditches, and later became a retreat for senior NKVD officers often visited by Lavrenty Beria. Nevertheless, executions continued at nearby locations such as Sukhanovka and Kommunarka until at least 1941 and likely onto 1953.

=== Execution process ===
Victims were rounded up as soon as sentences were handed down by non-judicial organs: committees of three persons, "troikas", or of two persons "dvoika", or of the military tribunal of the Supreme Court. They were then transported to Butovo in trucks marked "Bread" or "Meat" to disguise operations from local residents. Some prisoners would be immediately killed upon arrival when their truck was flooded with carbon monoxide, and the bodies then disposed of in nearby ditches. Most victims were led to a long barrack, ostensibly for a medical exam, where there was a roll call and reconciliation of people with file dossiers including photos. These same photos from NKVD files would later serve as memorials to victims. Only after the paperwork was complete would they pronounce the death sentence. After sunrise, NKVD officers, often drunk off the bucket of vodka provided to them, would escort prisoners away from the barracks and shoot them at close range to the back of the head, often with a Nagant M1895 revolver. Those shot were immediately, or a short time afterwards, dumped into one of 13 ditches totaling 900 m (0.56 miles) in length. The width of each ditch was 4–5 meters (~16 feet), and the depth approximately 4 m (13 ft). Executions and burials were made without notice to relatives and without church or civil funeral services. Relatives of those who were shot began only in 1989 to receive certificates indicating the exact date and cause of death.

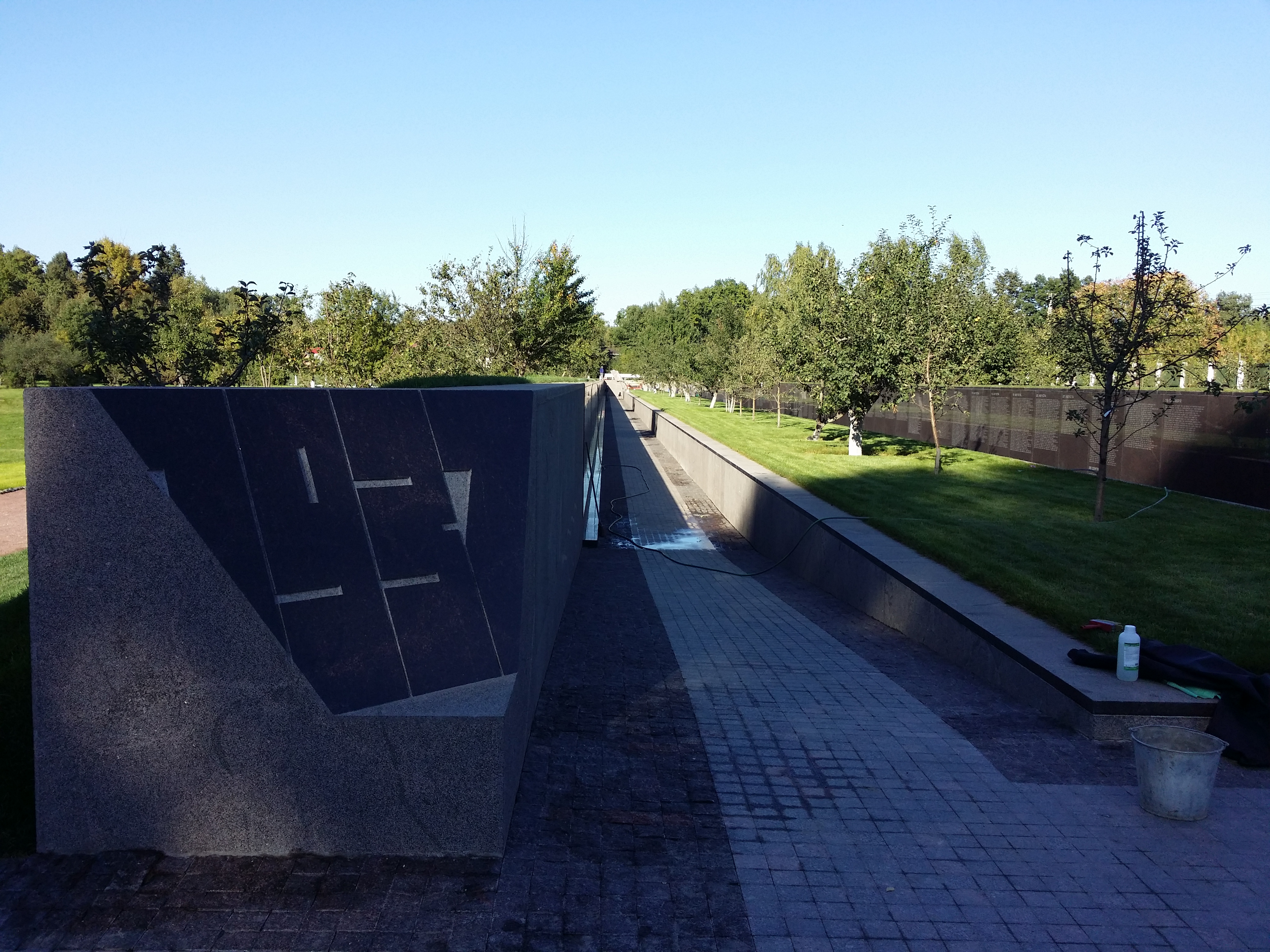
A wall in a memorial garden bearing the names of about 20,000 victims

=== Victims ===
Victims at Butovo were deemed "enemies of the people" and came from all parts of Soviet society and various nationalities, with many dying without understanding what crimes they had been accused of. They included workers, peasants, kulaks, former White Guards, and other "anti-Soviet elements," Russian aristocrats and the pre-revolutionary elite, Old Bolsheviks, military generals, sportsmen, aviators and artists, "dangerous social elements" such as tramps, beggars, thieves, petty criminals, and those guilty of "anti-Soviet agitation and propaganda." Victims were overwhelmingly male (95.86%) and most were between 25 and 50 years old when they died. Among those executed, 18 persons were older than 75 and 10 were children 15 years old and younger. One child was 16-year-old Misha Shamonin, an orphan and street child, for the theft of two loaves of bread. More than 60 different nationalities are also represented among the victims including 755 Ukrainians, French, Americans, Italians, Chinese, and Japanese. Nearly 1000 clergymen of the Russian Orthodox were executed at Butovo, as well as Lutheran, Protestant, and Catholic clergy, mostly from Poland or Austria. In particular, the Kommunarka witnessed executions of high-profile political and public figures from Lithuania, Latvia and Estonia, and Comintern leaders from Germany, Romania, France, Turkey, Bulgaria, Finland, and Hungary. Most of Mongolia's top leadership, including former Prime Minister Anandyn Amar and 28 associates, were executed at Kommunarka on 27 July 1941.

== Notable deaths ==
Butovo's status as a main execution site meant many notable people were killed and buried at the site including Soviet military commander Hayk Bzhishkyan; Tsarist statesman Vladimir Dzhunkovsky; the painter Aleksandr Drevin, film actress Marija Leiko, and photographer Gustav Klutsis who were all Latvian; Orthodox bishop Seraphim Chichagov, and Prince Dmitry Shakhovskoy; former President of the State Duma Fyodor Golovin; the first Russian aviator Nikolai Danilevsky; composer Mikhail Khitrovo-Kramskoi; theoretical physicist Hans Hellmann; anthropologist Ivar Lassy; five tsarist generals and representatives of Russian noble families such as the Rostopchins, the Tuchkovs, the Gagarins, the Obolenskys, the Olsufiyevs, and the Bibikovs.

Many German Communist Party (KPD) members were also among the victims, for example Hermann Taubenberger and Walter Haenisch, with over two hundred shot with the explicit approval of KPD leaders Wilhelm Pieck and Walter Ulbricht, having been betrayed to the NKVD, it is said, by Herbert Wehner, then still a member of the KPD Politburo.

Victims of the Stalinist Purges who died at Butovo

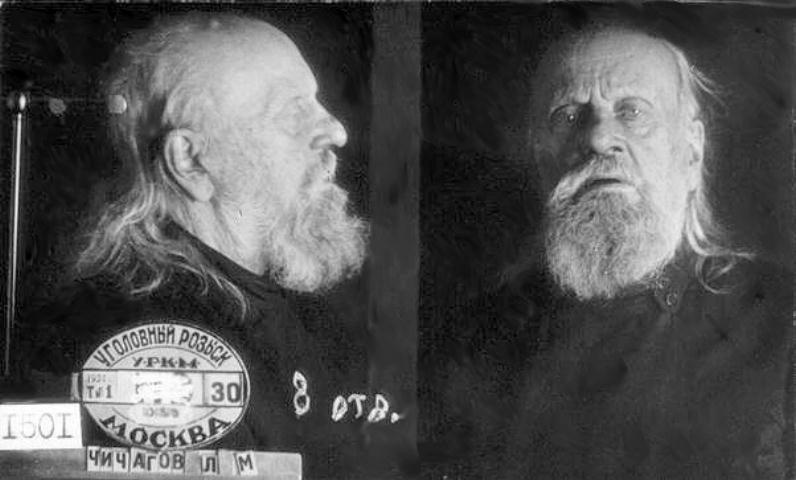
Seraphim Chichagov before being sentenced to death and executed

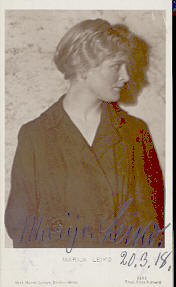
Latvian film and stage actress Marija Leiko was arrested in December 1937 and executed on 3 February 1938

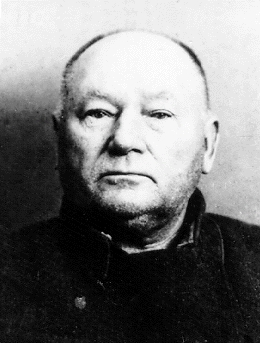
Jukums Vācietis after his arrest by the NKVD in 1937

== Legacy ==
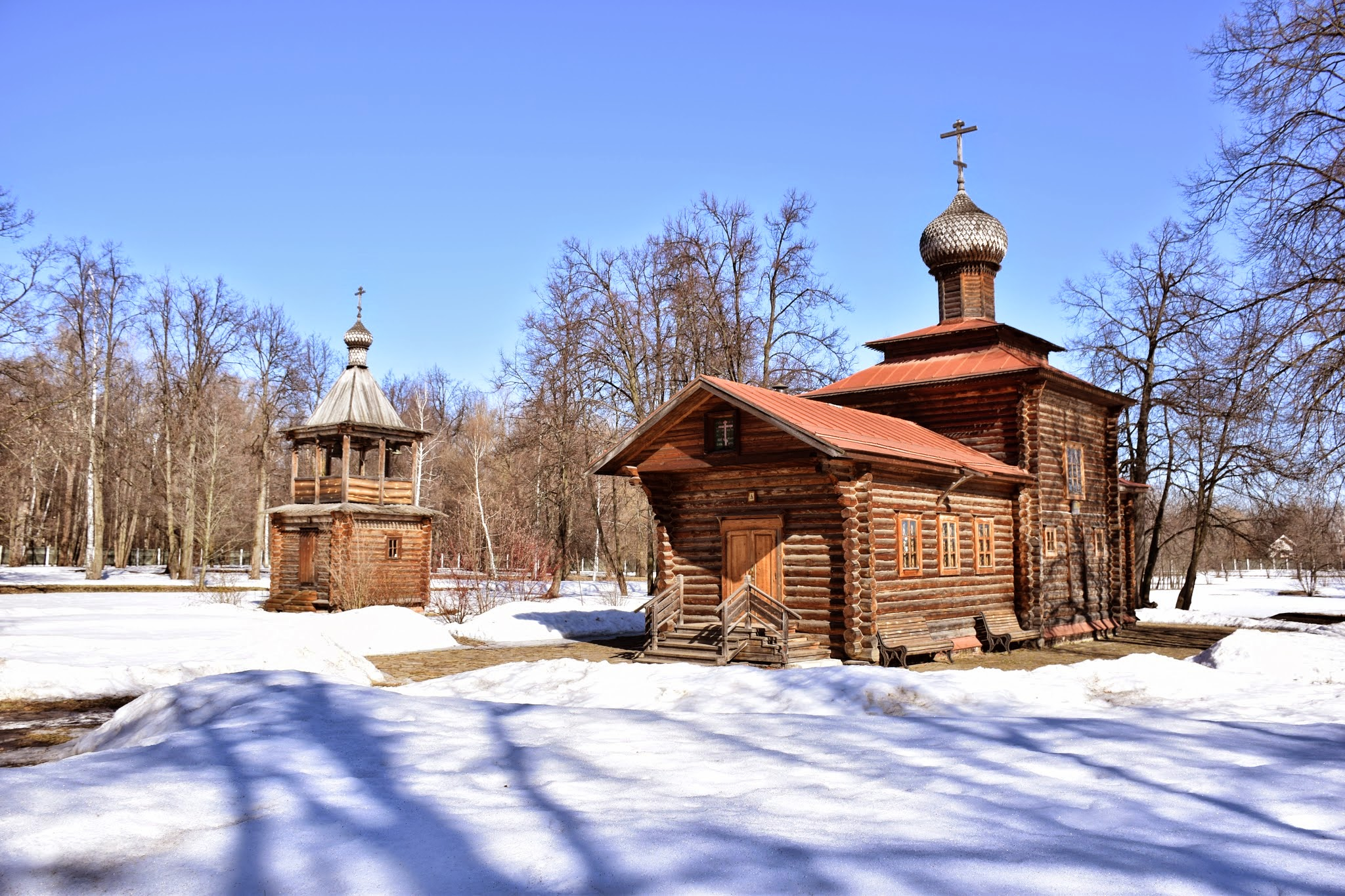
Church of the New Martyrs and Confessors of Russia

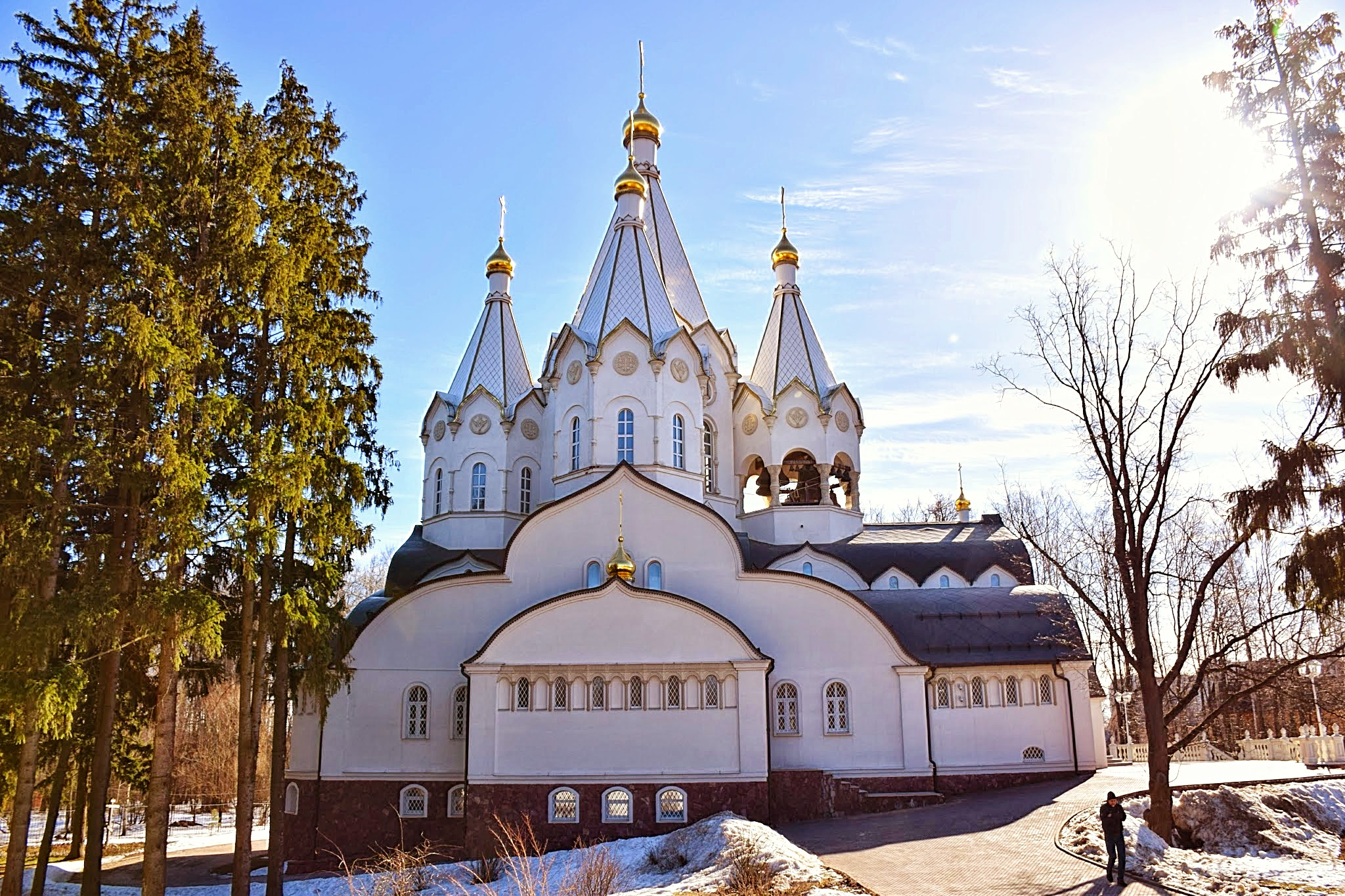
Church of the Resurrection

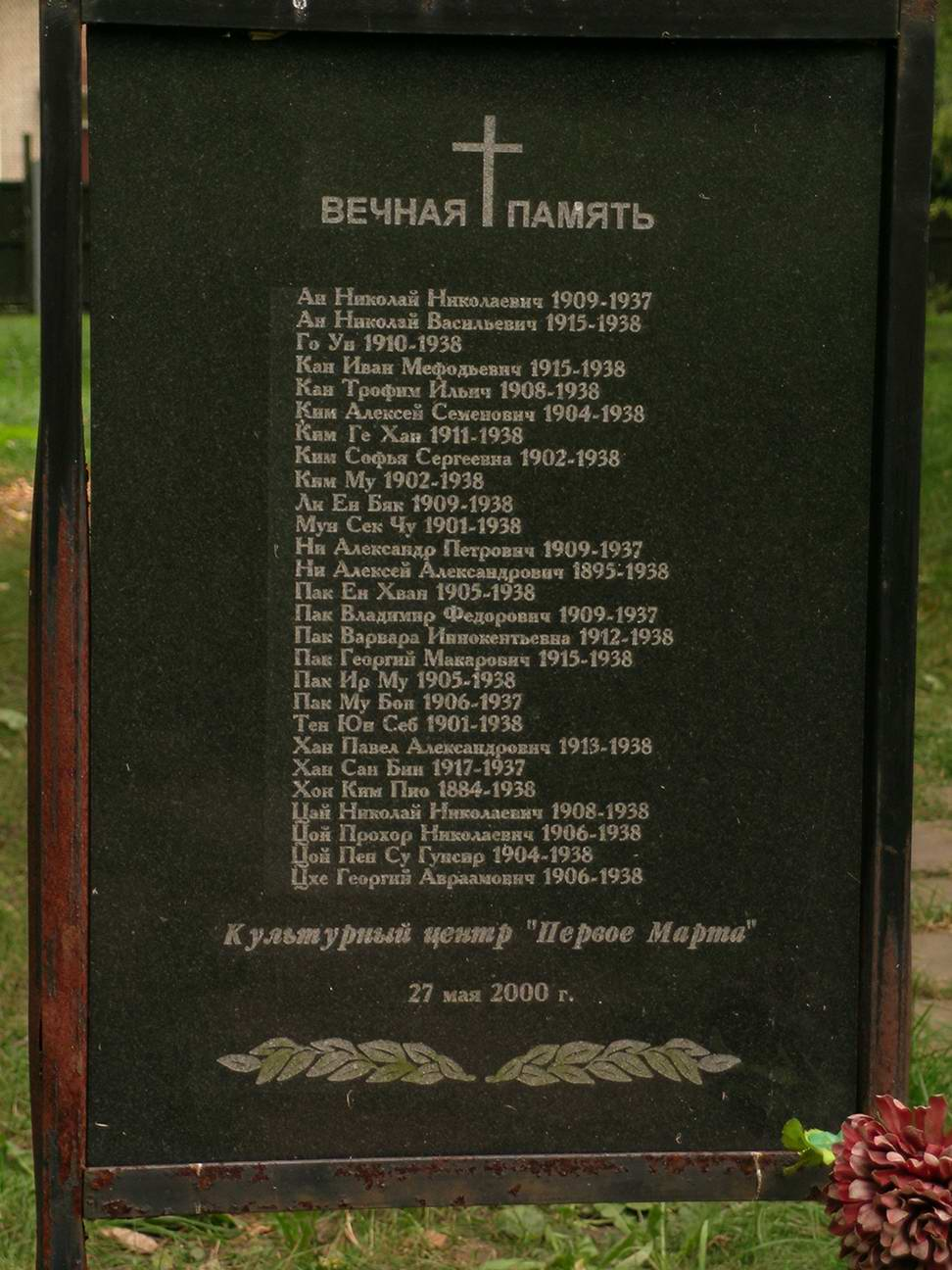
Memorial plaque for Koreans executed at Butovo

The Butovo Firing Range was heavily guarded by the Soviet KGB and, after the dissolution of the Soviet Union in 1991, the Russian FSK until 1995. On 7 June 1993, a small group of activists, officials, and some relatives of those who died at Butovo, visited the site. In October 1993, a plaque was inaugurated that read "In this zone of the Butovo shooting range, several thousand people were, in 1937–1938, shot in secret and buried." A year later, Russian Orthodox Church interest in the site was piqued when archivists discovered that Seraphim Chichagov, the Metropolitan of Leningrad and senior figure of the church, was killed there. In 1995, Russian security agencies transferred both Butovo and Kommunarka to the Russian Orthodox Church for "use without time limit". A small wooden church, the Church of the New Martyrs and Confessors of Russia, was inaugurated on 16 June 1996. The Church of the Resurrection, a larger white stone structure, was completed in 2007.

On 30 October 2007, Russian President Vladimir Putin commemorated the 70th anniversary of the repressions by visiting the Butovo Firing Range, attributing the deaths of victims to the "excesses of the political conflict." Putin's statement was criticized by some who pointed out this statement signaled his failure, and perhaps the failure Russian society as a whole, to come to grips with the fact that the victims of Butovo were killed not because they were political opponents of Stalin, but simply because of their backgrounds, nationalities, or that they simply were caught up in the purge mechanism that sought to repress or eliminate large swaths of potential dissenters to Stalin's rule.

In September 2017, a new memorial, "Garden of Memory", was opened. The monument consists of two granite slabs on which are engraved the names of 20,762 people who died at Butovo. The monument measures 984 ft. long, and 6.5 ft. tall.

== See also ==
- Remembrance Day for the Victims of Political Repression, annual Russian event since 1991, held on 30 October
- Kommunarka memorial complex, near Moscow
- Kuropaty, Belarus
- Mass graves in the Soviet Union
- Sandarmokh, Karelia (Northwest Russia)
