= Wayside crosses in Rostov-on-Don =

Wayside crosses are monumental constructions in the form of a cross in the city of Rostov-on-Don, Russia.

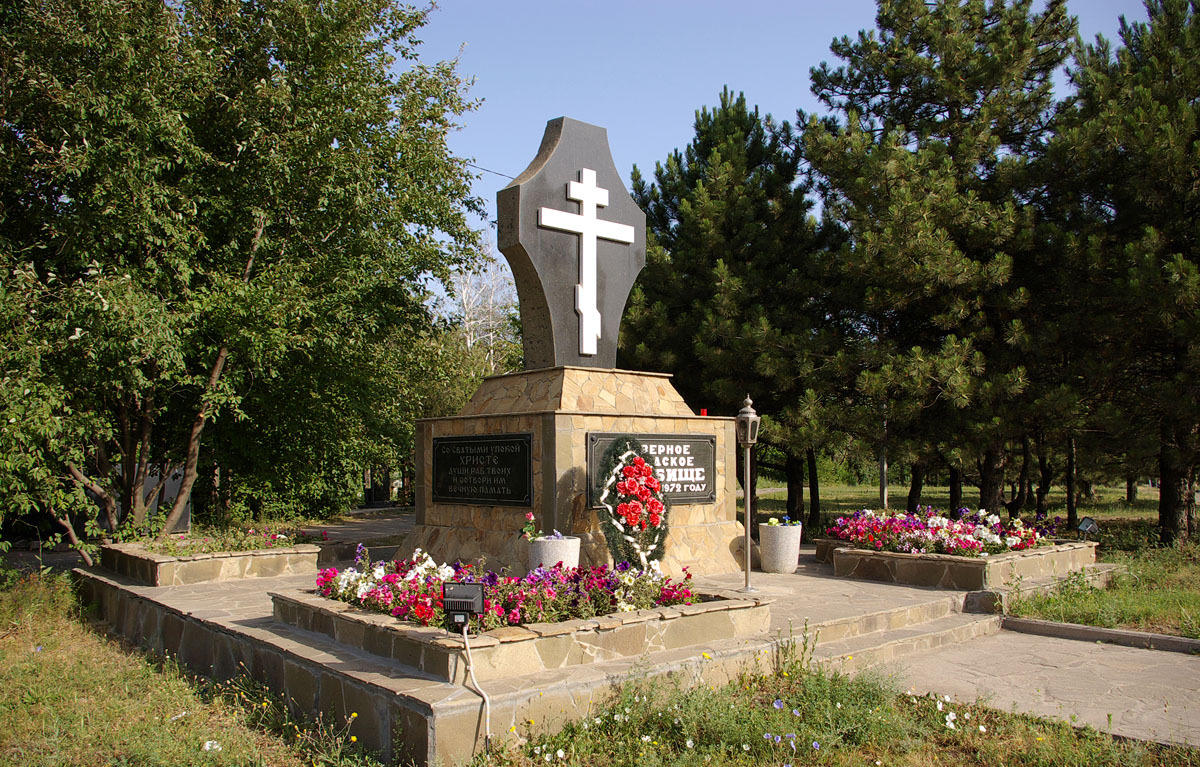
Wayside cross at the entrance to the Northern Cemetery

== History and description ==
The tradition of erecting wayside crosses began in Russia a very long time. They were installed mostly at road intersections or entrance to a city or village. Wayside crosses were also installed in honor of church holidays or saints. Wayside and commemorative crosses were erected in various parts of Rostov-on-Don.

In 1994, The International Fund of Slavic Literature and Culture held an event to install the wayside crosses in the name of the Holy Equal-to-the-Apostles Methodius and Cyril, who invented the Slavonic alphabet, in thirty-one cities, including Rostov-on-Don. In May 1994, in honor of St. Cyril and Methodius, the teachers of the Slavs, was installed and consecrated a venerable memorable four-pointed stone cross.

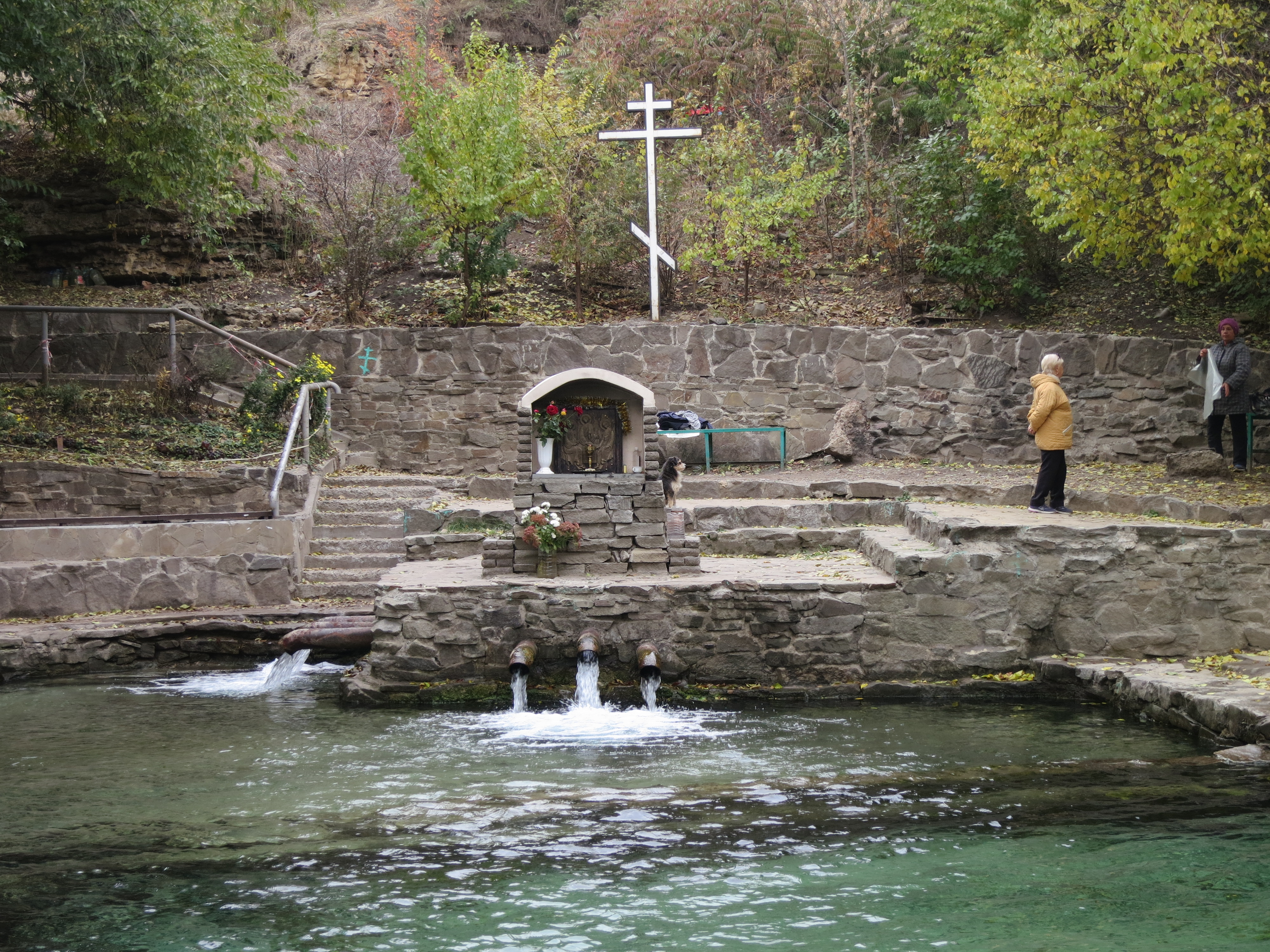
Wayside cross at Gremuchiy Spring

== Literature ==
- Малаховский Е. И. Храмы и культовые сооружения Ростова-на-Дону, утраченные и существующие. — Ростов-на-Дону: NB, 2006. — 240 с., ил. — ISBN 5-98155-014-7 (in Russian).
