= Motovilov =

Motovilov (Russian: Мотовилов) or female form Motovilova (Russian: Мотовилова) is a Russian surname. Notable people with this surname include:

- Grigory Motovilov (born 1998), Russian basketball player
- Nikolay Motovilov (1809 - 1879), Russian landowner, businessman, and biographer
