= Seraphim Chichagov =

Russian Orthodox bishop

- Митрополит Серафим
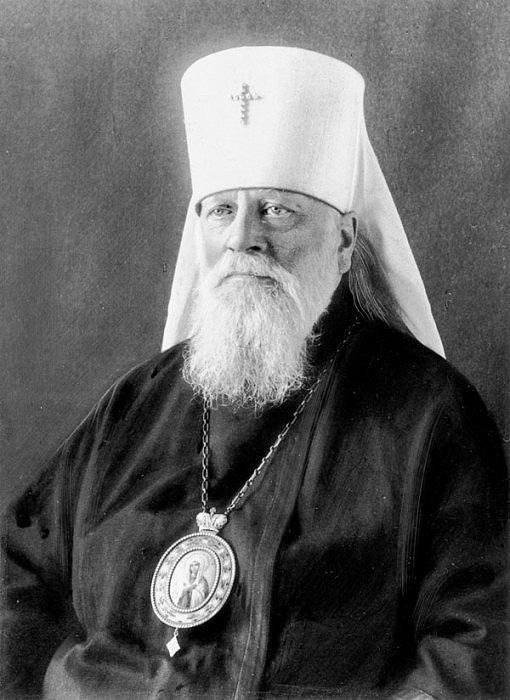
- Seraphim Chichagov circa 1920
- Title: Metropolitan bishop

Personal life
- Born: Leonid Mikhailovich Chichagov; Леонид Михайлович Чичагов; 9 June 1856 Saint Petersburg, Russian Empire
- Died: 11 December 1937 (aged 81) Butovo firing range, Moscow, Russian SFSR, USSR

Religious life
- Religion: Eastern Orthodox
- Monastic name: Seraphim

Senior posting
- Based in: Petrograd

Metropolitan Seraphim (Russian: Митрополи́т Серафи́м 9 June or 9 January 1856 – 11 December 1937), born Leonid Mikhailovich Chichagov (Russian: Леони́д Миха́йлович Чичаго́в, was a Metropolitan bishop of the Russian Orthodox Church who was executed by firing squad, and was canonized by the Church in 1997 as a New Martyr.

Born into a military family, he enlisted as an artillery officer after finishing his schooling. Influenced by his experiences in the Russo-Turkish War and meetings with John of Kronstadt, he resigned from the military and became a clergyman. He retired in 1933 due to age and ill health. Four years later he was arrested and charged with monarchist propaganda. Sentenced to death by firing squad, he was executed on 11 December 1937 at the Butovo firing range.

== Early life ==
Leonid Mikhailovich Chichagov was born on 9 June 1856 in St. Petersburg, Russia to artillery Colonel Mikhail Nikiforovich Chichagov and Maria Nikolaevna. He was born into a minor noble family from the Kostroma area with a strong military background. His great-grandfather participated in a study of the Arctic Ocean during the reign of Empress Catherine the Great, and his grandfather, Admiral Paul Chichagov, fought in defense of Russia during the French invasion of Russia. Leonid Chichagov was baptized on 20 October 1856 in the Church of St. Alexander Nevsky at the Mikhailovsky military school.

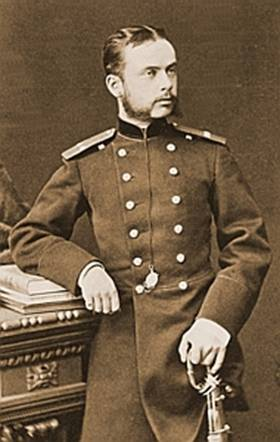
Leonid Chichagov as an artillery officer, year unknown.

Chichagov graduated with honors from the military academy and received the rank of lieutenant in 1875. He was assigned to the artillery and fought in the Russo-Turkish War (1877–1878). He was awarded the Cross of St. George for courage displayed at the Siege of Plevna. He also received the Order of St. Anna and Order of St. Stanislaus.

After the Russo-Turkish war ended in 1878, Chichagov returned to St. Petersburg. There he met John of Kronstadt, at the time a well-known and highly respected minister, who became his mentor. On 8 April 1879, he married Natalia Dokhturov, daughter of General Dmitry Dokhturov, with whom he had four daughters: Vera, Natalia, Leonida, and Yekaterina.

As an officer, Chichagov received a number of foreign decorations. In recognition of his actions as an artillery specialist in maneuvers of French-allied Russian armies, he was awarded the Legion of Honour. He received additional military honors from various countries, including the Romanian Iron Cross, Bulgarian Order of St Alexander, and Montenegrin Order of Prince Danilo I, and was promoted to Stabskapitän in 1881. During his military service, he published his memoirs, Дневник пребывания императора Александра II в Дунайской армии, reflecting his experiences with the artillery in various engagements.

His war experiences had a profound impact on Chichagov. He studied graduate-level medicine to provide better care for wounded soldiers, and pioneered research on the idea of treating wounds using substances derived from plants. In addition to medicine, he also became interested in theology. Chichagov undertook independent theological studies during which he decided to resign from military service and devote his life to the Church. Though his wife did not initially accept his decision, she was eventually convinced after speaking at length with John of Kronstadt.

== Priesthood ==
Chichagov tendered his resignation from the military on 15 April 1890 or 1891. He moved to Moscow with his family where he commenced his ecclesiastical studies. He was ordained a deacon on 26 February 1893 in the Church of the Twelve Apostles, a minor cathedral of the Moscow Kremlin. Two days later, he was ordained a priest.

He began his pastoral work in the Church of the Twelve Apostles. He paid 15,000 rubles out of pocket to renovate the dilapidated church. He was awarded the right to wear the nabedrennik and skufia vestments in recognition of his work in restoring the church.

His wife died after a serious illness in 1895. In 1896 he was appointed military chaplain for the artillery troops stationed in the Moscow garrison, for whom he ministered from the church of St. Nicholas. His personal contributions helped renovate the facility, which had been abandoned for 30 years.

As a priest, Fr. Chichagov made several pilgrimages to Serafimo-Diveevsky Monastery and the Sarov monastery in Sarov. During these visits he wrote a history of the Sarov monastery and a biography of the monk Seraphim of Sarov based on interviews with nuns who had known the saint. This work would later contribute to the canonization of St. Seraphim in 1903. His extensive history of the Diveevsky monastery was published in 1896. Natalia Chichagov was buried at the Diveevsky monastery, alongside an empty grave intended for Fr. Chichagov.

Following the death of his wife, he became a monk at the Trinity Lavra of St. Sergius and received the monastic name Seraphim. He was later appointed Father Superior and Archimandrite of the Monastery of Saint Euthymius in Suzdal, and then of the New Jerusalem Monastery in Moscow. In 1905 he was appointed Bishop of Sukhumi. In subsequent years he was appointed Bishop of Orel (1906–1908), Chişinău (1908–1912), Tver (1912–1917), and Warsaw (1918–1921). In 1928 he was appointed Metropolitan of Petrograd.

== Works ==
Chichagov was also an iconographer: his most famous works are an icon of "The Saviour in a white tunic" and "St. Seraphim of Sarov’s Prayer on the stone". He also wrote the "Chronicles of St. Seraphim" about St Seraphim of Sarov.

== Retirement and death ==
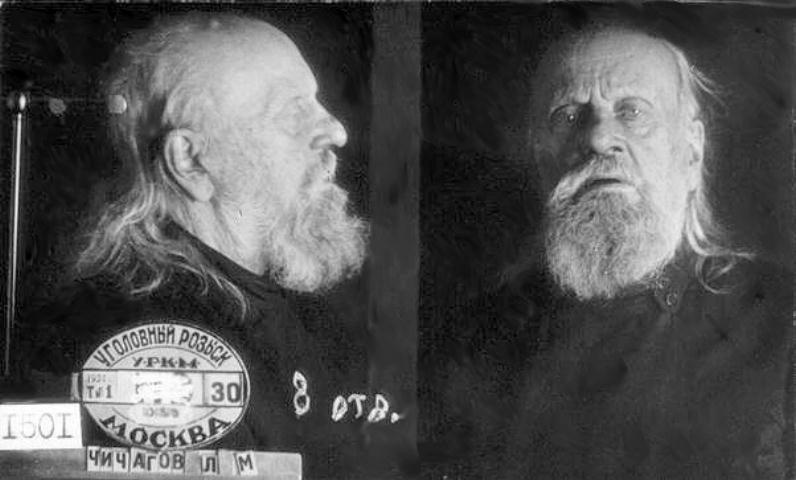
Seraphim (Chichagov), retired metropolitan of Leningrad, in Soviet prison Taganskoye, before being sentenced to death and shot.

Metropolitan Seraphim retired in 1933 due to old age, ill health, and the threat of potential arrest. He celebrated his last Divine Liturgy on 24 October of that year in Leningrad, after which he travelled to Moscow. He stayed briefly at the residence of the Patriarch locum tenens, Metropolitan Sergius, before moving to an apartment.

Seraphim's health deteriorated steadily after his retirement. He suffered from hypertonic dehydration and heart disease, and gradually lost all mobility. Despite his condition, he was charged with monarchist propaganda and arrested on 30 November 1937. Upon his arrest, the NKVD officers carried him from his home on a stretcher. He was imprisoned in Taganka Prison and sentenced to death by firing squad. He was executed at the Butovo firing range on 11 December 1937.

== See also ==
- Neomartyr
