= Gremuchiy Spring =

Coordinates: 47.2061°N 39.6933°E

Gremuchiy
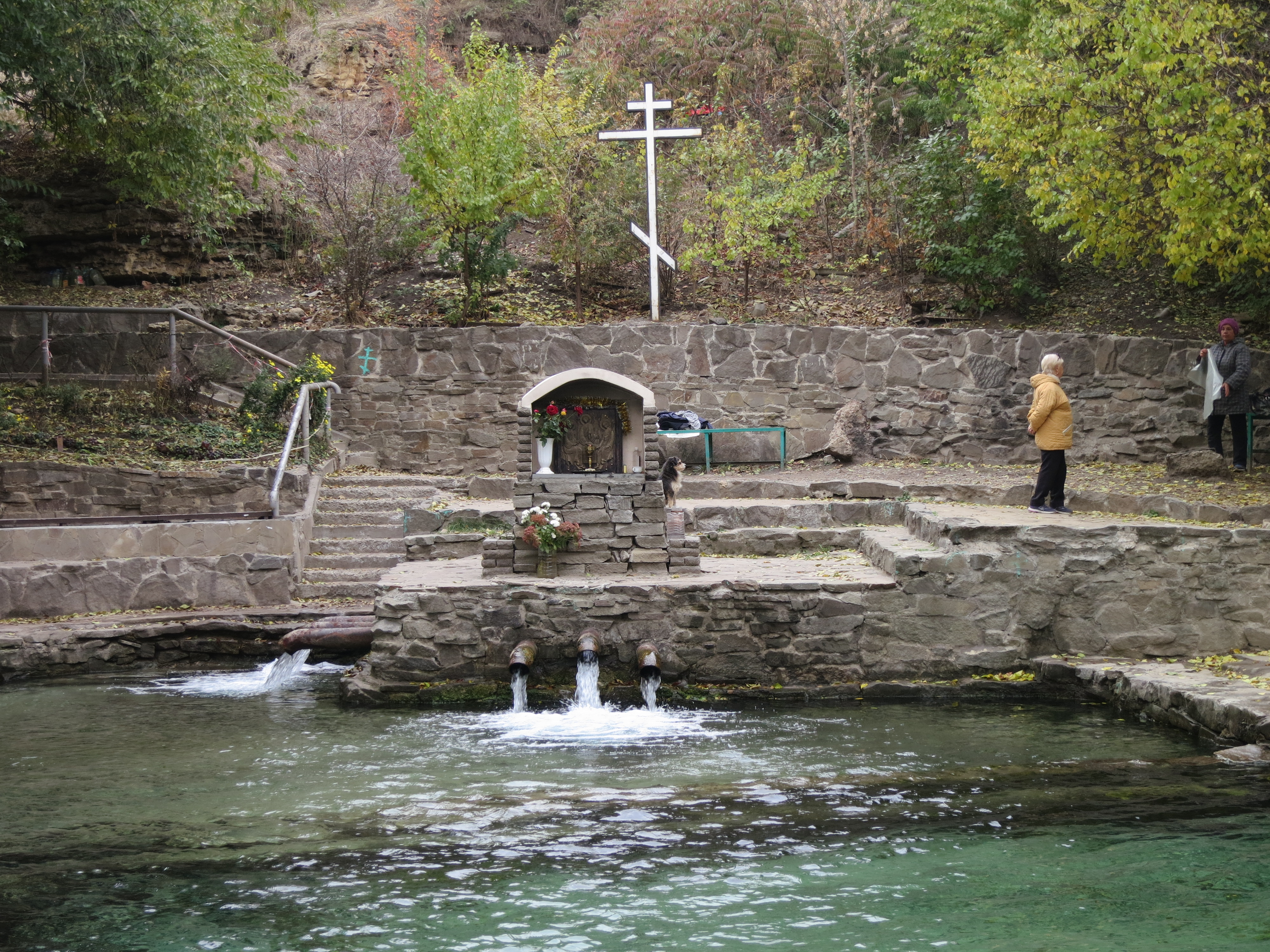

- Location within Rostov Oblast Location within Russia
- Location: Rostov-on-Don, Russia

Gremuchiy (Russian: Гремучий родник, literally: Fulminating) is a spring and a nature monument that is situated in Western part of Zheleznodorozhny District of Rostov-on-Don, Russia.

== Description ==
Gremuchiy spring is also simply called Gremuchka spring, or Holy spring, or Holy spring of Our Lady of the Don. According to a legend the spring received his Name ― Gremuchiy from Peter I, when he was passing by and heard a loud noise of the spring water. The stream is situated close to the Church of St. Seraphim of Sarov.

For the first time Gremuchiy spring was described in a geological guidebook of Rostov region, published in 1919 by a well-known geologist and paleontologist, Professor Vladimir Vladimirovich Bogachev. Previously. Back then the spring really was thundering throughout the district. He overthrew under a great pressure from a fairly high altitude. The noise of falling water was heard long before approaching the stream itself.

The spring was sanctified in the 1990s and a large white cross was installed here. The curbstone was built here, and the water was taken into the pipes. Near the spring there were set up two swimming pools, stairs, and benches. The pools are shallow. One is small, childish, less than a meter deep. The other is for adult people, it's a little deeper. The water is clean, transparent and is considered to have healing effect.

The spring has a powerful head of water and does not freeze in winter. The water in the spring is clear and cold, its temperature is 10 degrees of Celsius year round. The spring is popular with the locals, its water is used for drinking and bathing even during the Epiphany frosts.

== Gallery ==
Gremuchiy Spring

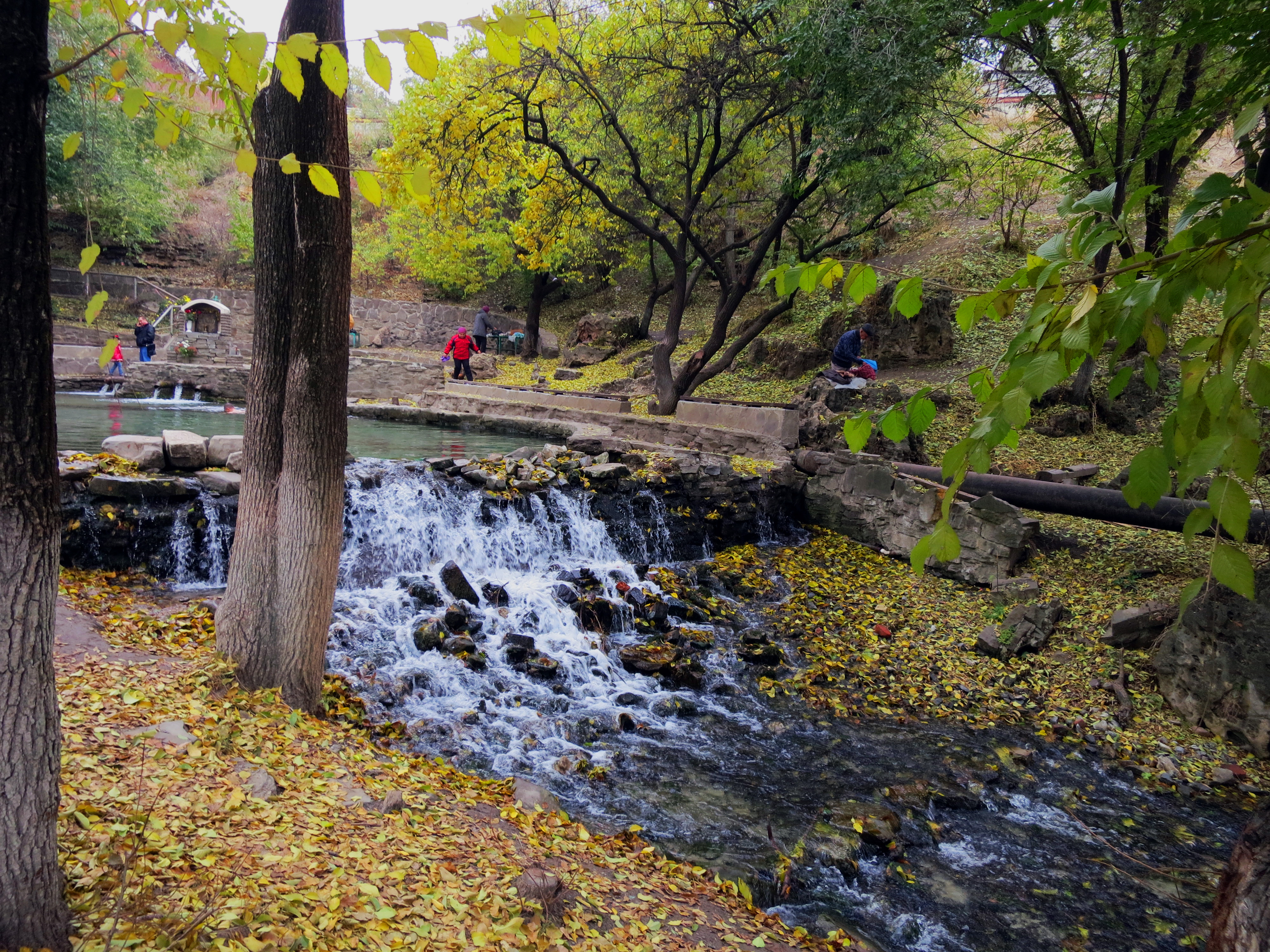

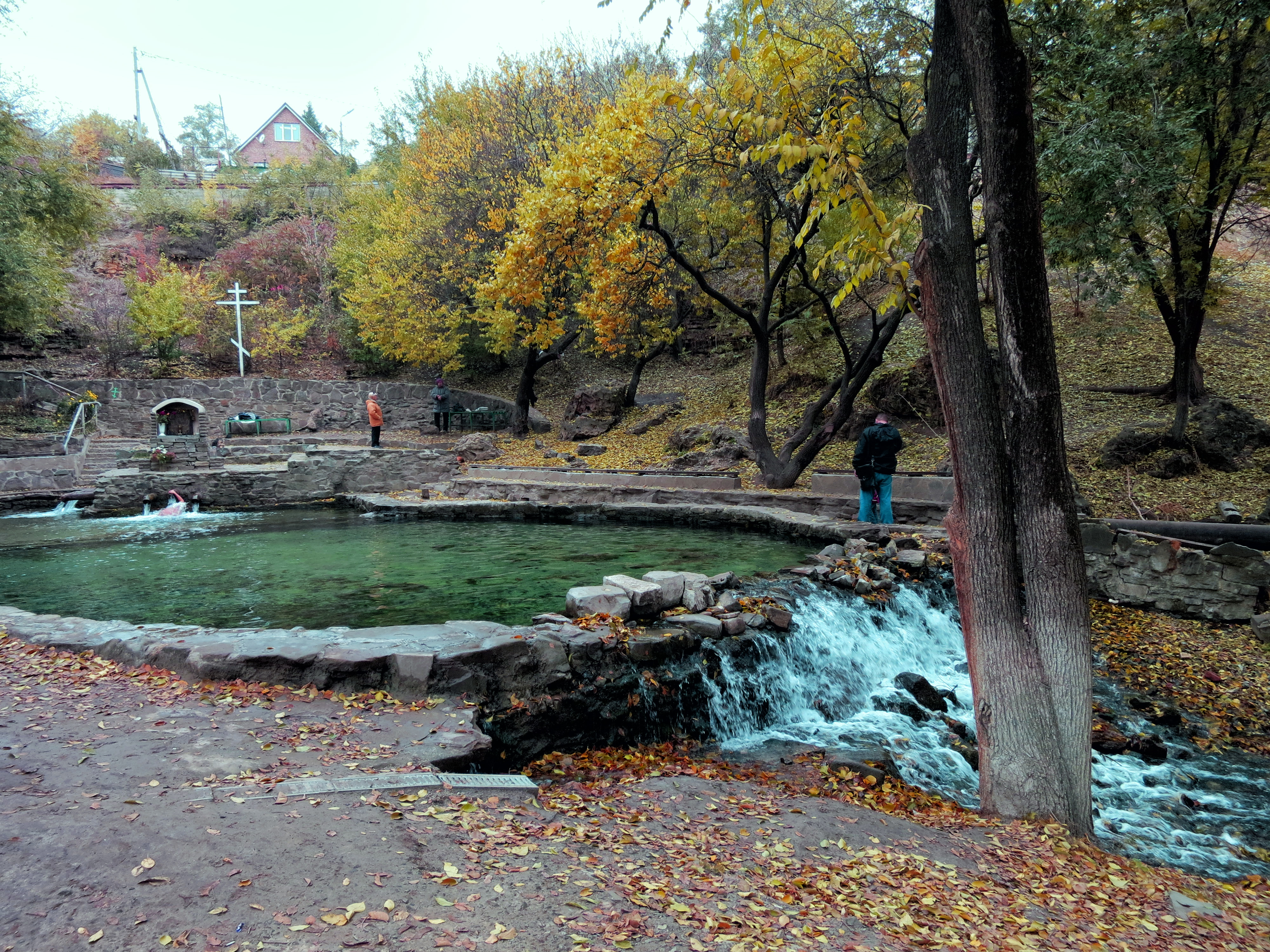

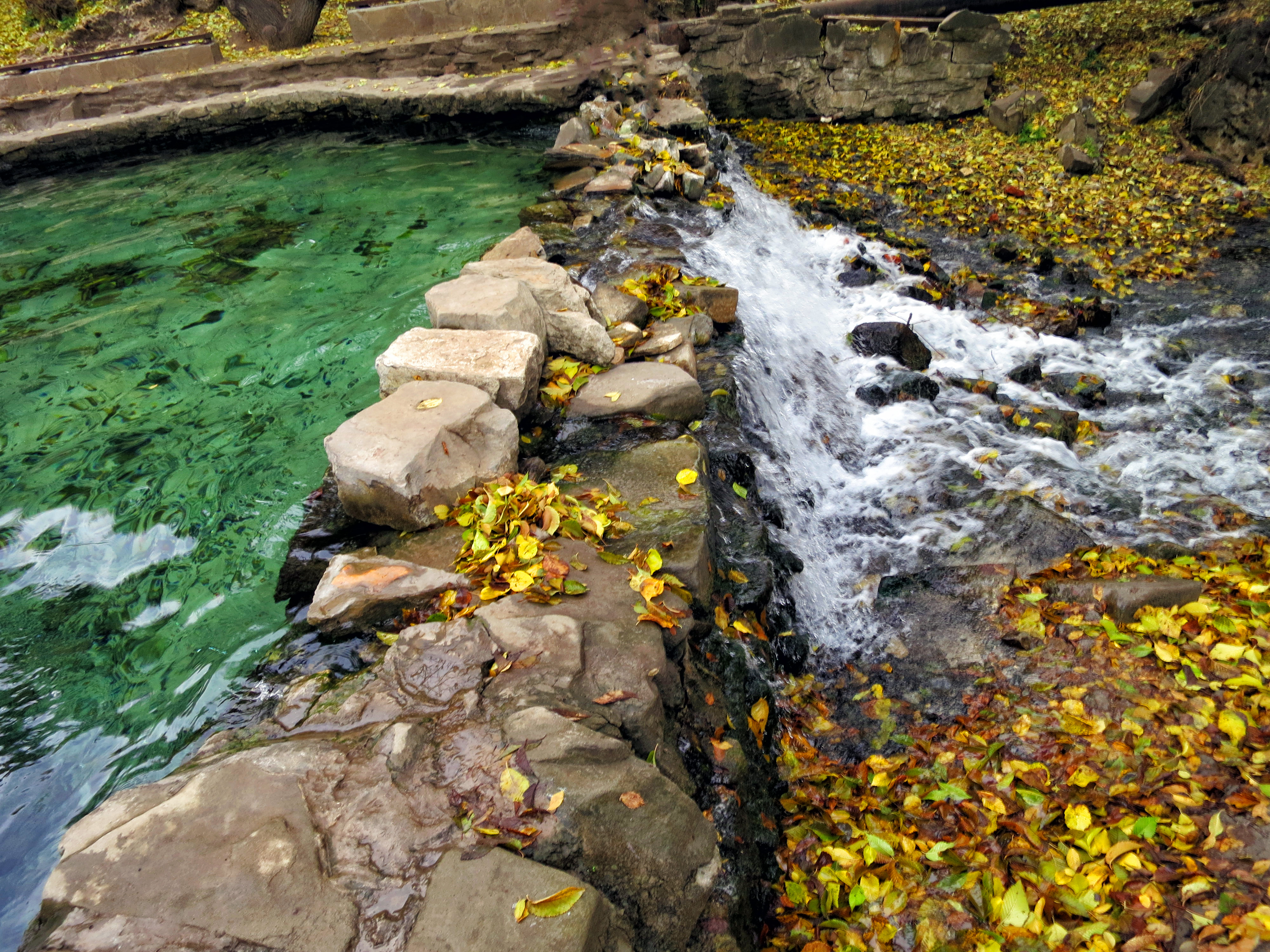
