= Church of St. Seraphim of Sarov, Rostov-on-Don =

Church in Rostov Oblast, Russia

Church of Saint Seraphim of Sarov
- Russian: Храм Преподобного Серафима Саровского
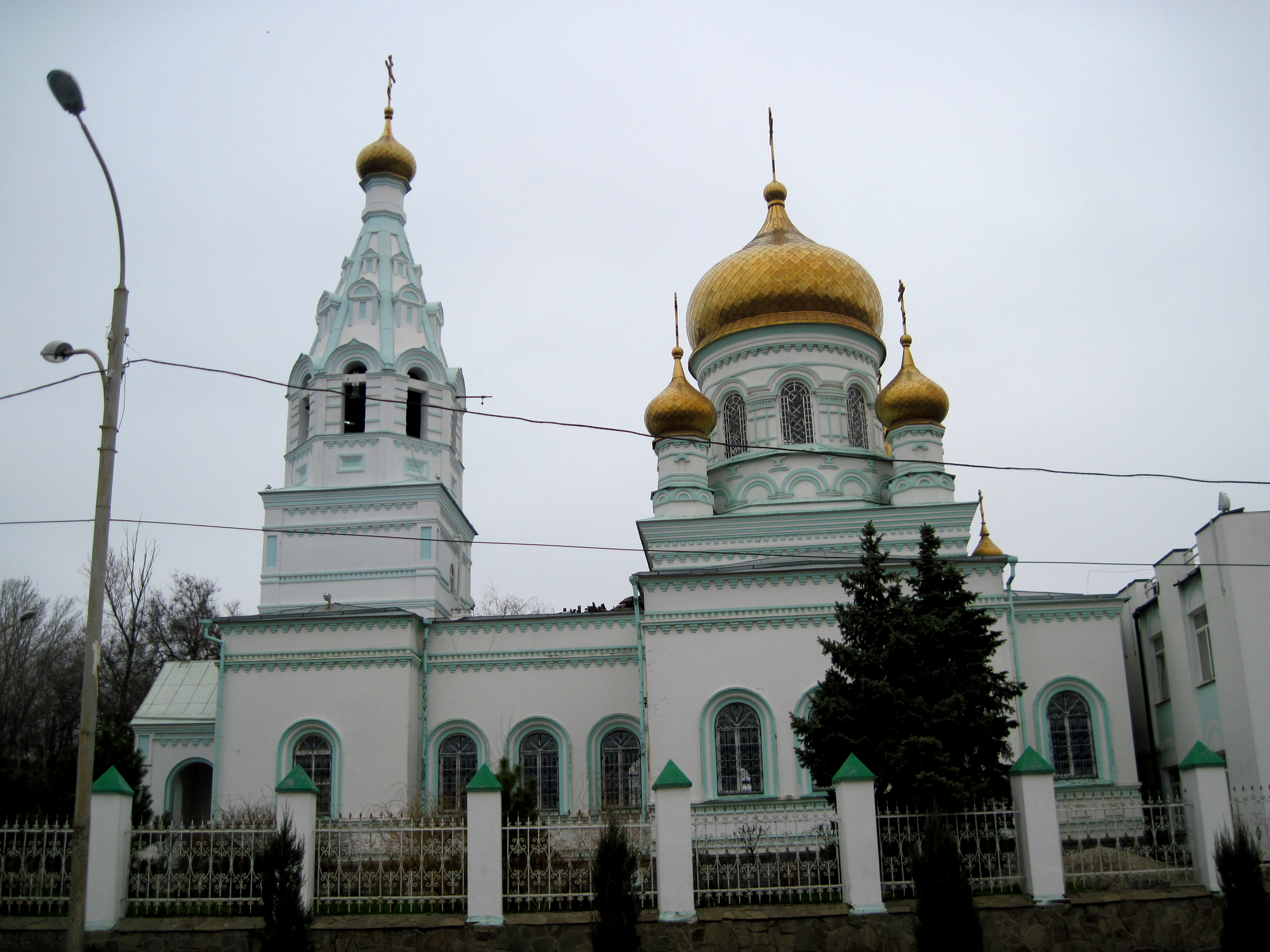
- Church of Saint Seraphim of Sarov
- 47°12′32″N 39°41′23″E
- Location: Rostov-on-Don, Rostov Oblast, Russia
- Country: Russia
- Denomination: Russian Orthodox Church

History
- Status: Parish church
- Dedication: Seraphim of Sarov

Architecture
- Completed: 1911

The Church of Saint Seraphim of Sarov (Russian: Храм Преподобного Серафима Саровского) is a Russian Orthodox church in Rostov-on-Don, Russia. It belongs to the Diocese of Rostov and Novocherkassk of Russian Orthodox Church. It was built in 1911 on the project of architect Boris Raichenkov.

== History ==
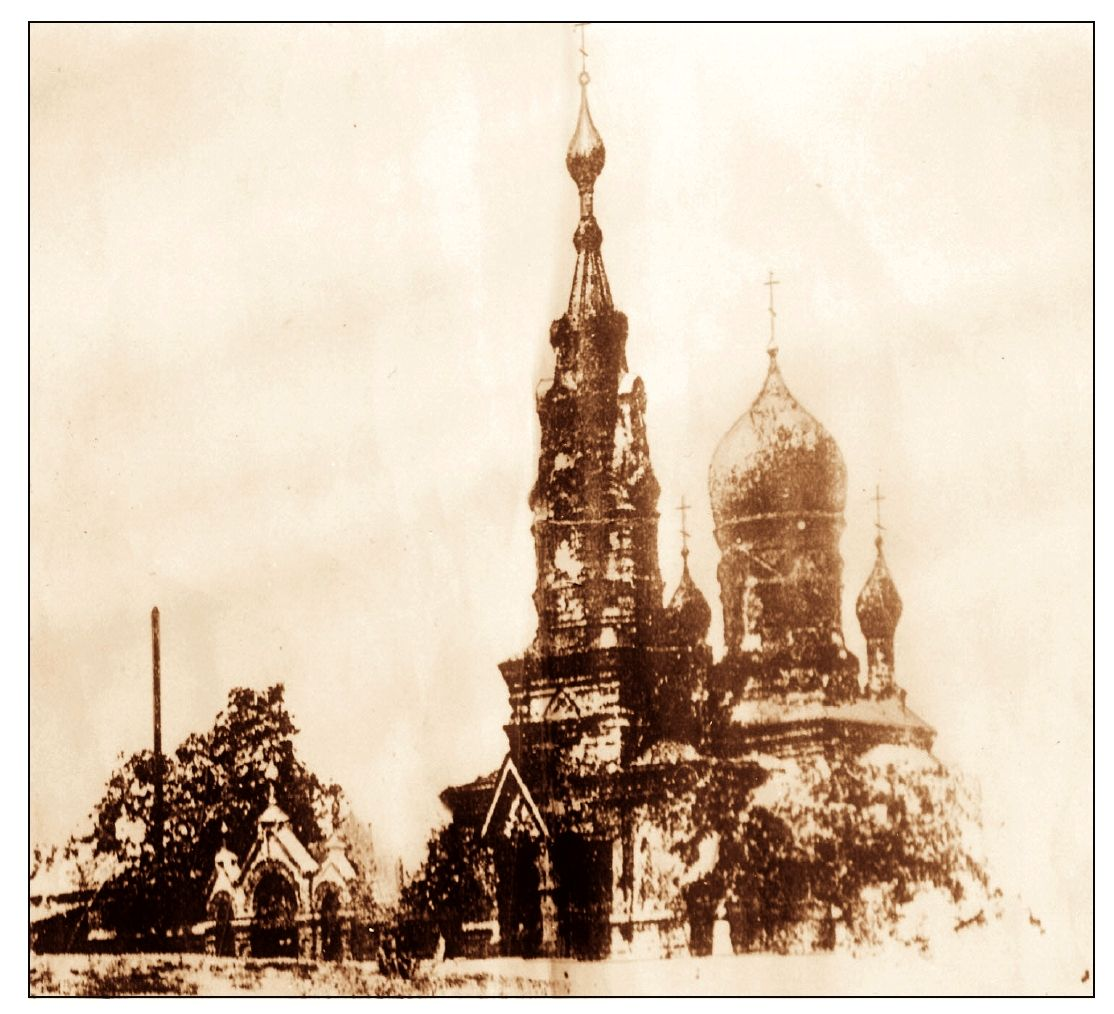
The Church of Saint Seraphim of Sarov before Russian Revolution of 1917

Orthodox dwellers of Gnilovskaya village (which was situated at the present-day territory of Rostov-on-Don) were among the first in Russia in 1904 to build a church in the name of Seraphim of Sarov. In 1911, the construction of the church was finished and the building was consecrated on 4 December of the same year.

In 1922, under the pretext of helping the starving in Soviet Russia, relics made of silver and gold were expropriated from St. Seraphim's Church. The church was closed in 1937, but services were renewed in 1942 and continued to be held until 1956.

In late 1950s, the church building was reconstructed and later hosted a music school.

In 1992, the Orthodox community of Rostov-on-Don and local cossacks launched a campaign to regain all buildings that used to belong to church. In 1995, a reconstruction work began in the church. On 14 September 2004 the church was consecrated again by Bishop of Rostov and Novocherkassk Panteleimon.
