= Diveyevsky District =

Diveyevsky District Дивеевский район (Russian)
- District
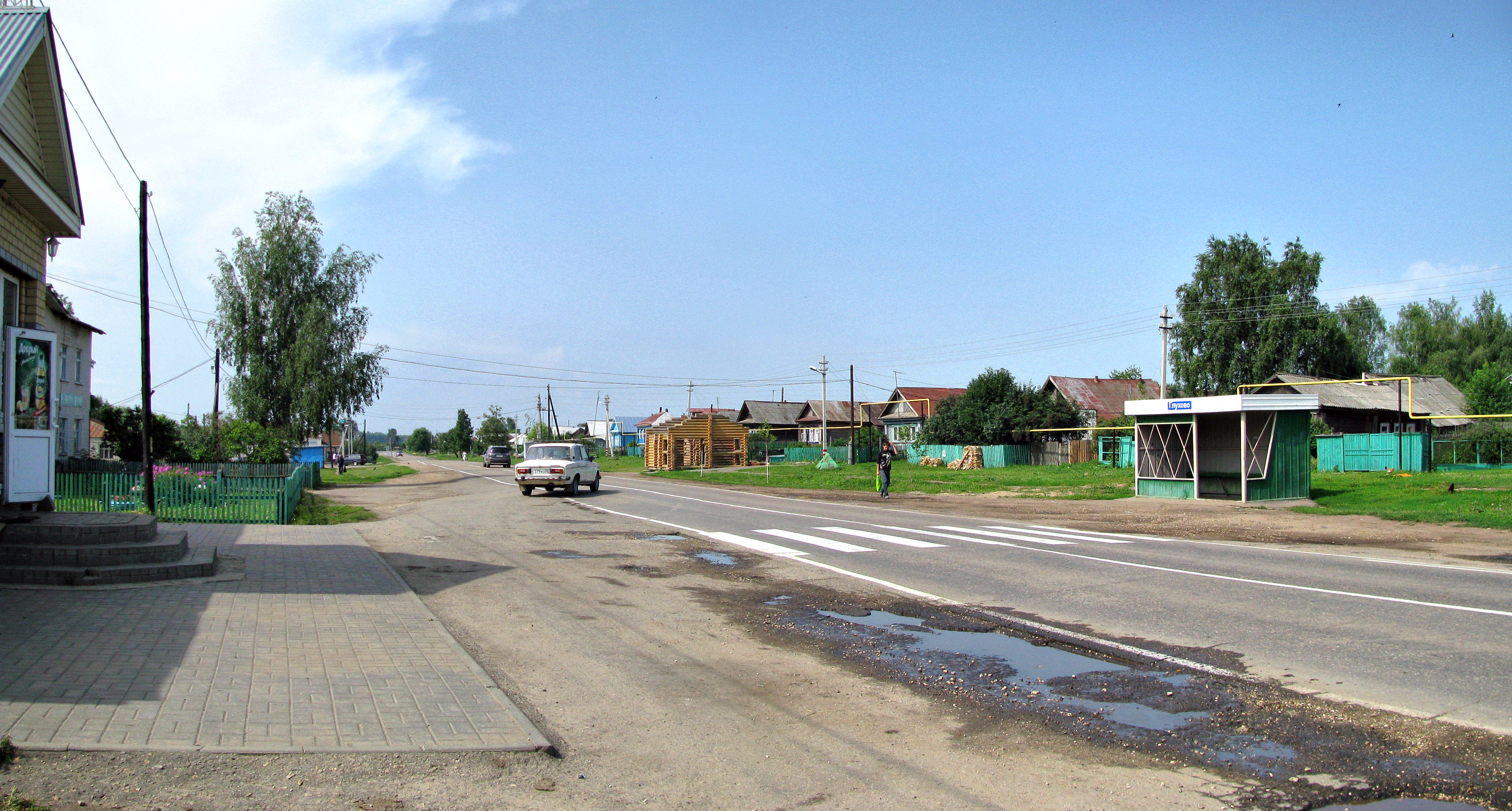
- The selo of Glukhovo in Diveyevsky District

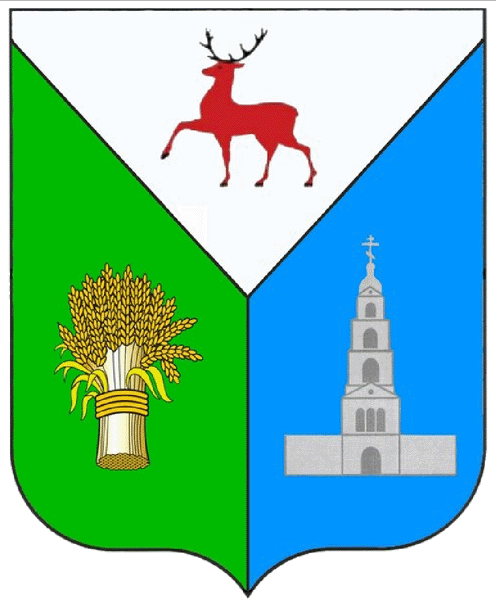
- Coat of arms
- Location of Diveyevsky District in Nizhny Novgorod Oblast
- Coordinates: 55°02′45″N 43°13′57″E
- Country: Russia
- Federal subject: Nizhny Novgorod Oblast
- Established: 1929
- Administrative center: Diveyevo

Area
  - Total: 844.8 km^{2} (326.2 sq mi)

Population (2010 Census)
  - Total: 16,618
  - Density: 19.67/km^{2} (50.95/sq mi)
  - Urban: 0%
  - Rural: 100%

Administrative structure
  - Administrative divisions: 6 Selsoviets
  - Inhabited localities: 45 rural localities

Municipal structure
  - Municipally incorporated as: Diveyevsky Municipal District
  - Municipal divisions: 0 urban settlements, 6 rural settlements
- Time zone: UTC+3 (MSK)
- OKTMO ID: 22632000
- Website: http://diveevo-adm.ru

Diveyevsky District (Russian: Диве́евский райо́н) is an administrative district (raion), one of the forty in Nizhny Novgorod Oblast, Russia. Municipally, it is incorporated as Diveyevsky Municipal District. It is located in the south of the oblast. The area of the district is 844.8 square kilometers (326.2 sq mi). Its administrative center is the rural locality (a selo) of Diveyevo. Population: 16,618 (2010 Census); 17,848 (2002 census); 18,375 (1989 Soviet census). The population of Diveyevo accounts for 38.6% of the district's total population.

== History ==
The district was established in 1929.
