= Diveyevo =

Rural locality in Diveyevsky District, Nizhny Novgorod Oblast, Russia

Coordinates: 55°02′45″N 43°13′57″E

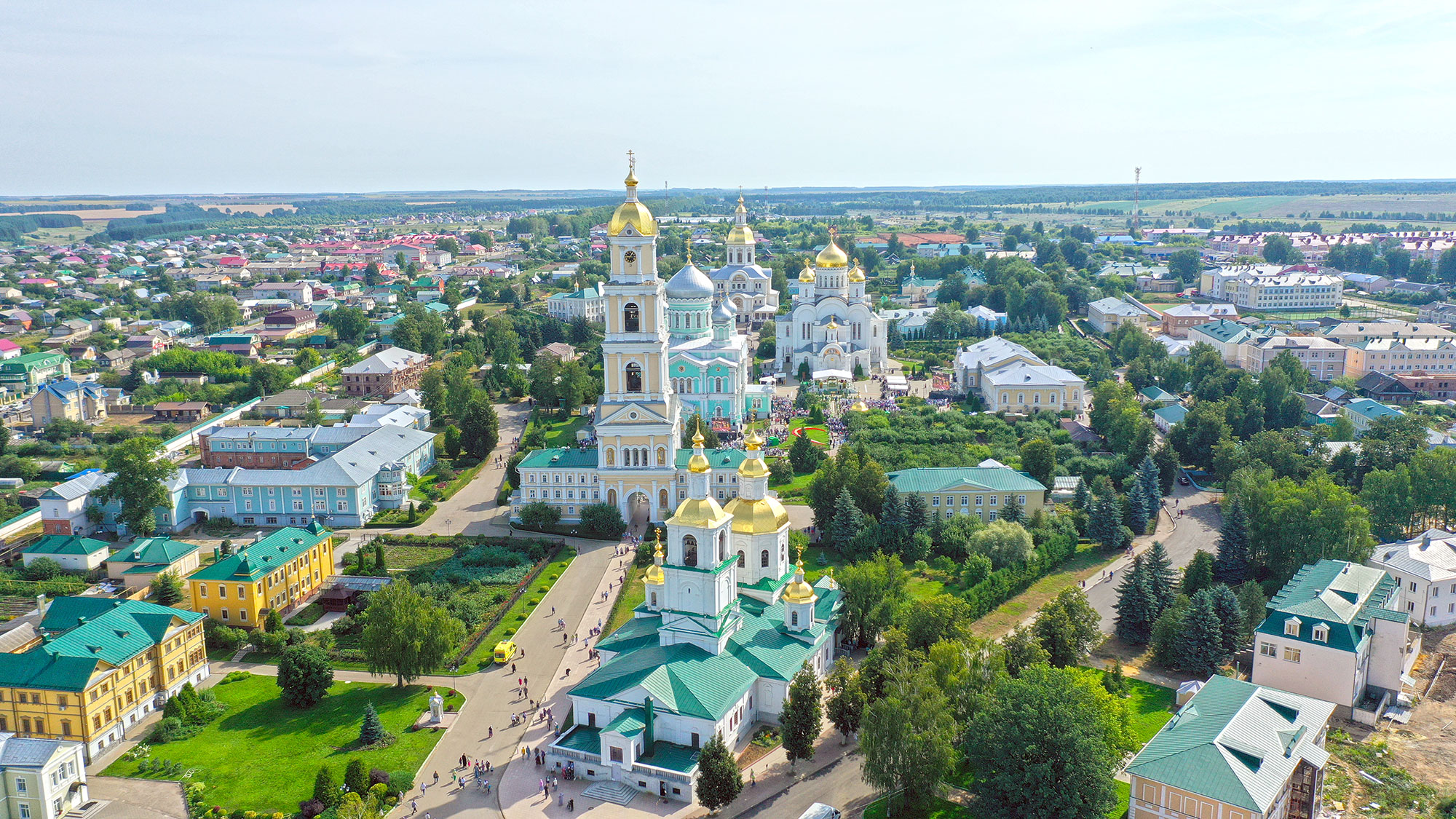
Serafimo-Diveyevsky Convent

Diveyevo (Russian: Диве́ево) is a rural locality (a selo) and the administrative center of Diveyevsky District of Nizhny Novgorod Oblast, Russia. Population: 6,408 (2010 census); 6,500 (2002 census); 5,511 (1989 Soviet census).

Serafimo-Diveyevsky Convent, one of the largest and frequently visited monasteries in Russia, is located in Diveyevo. This is a popular Russian Orthodox pilgrimage destination because of major historical significance connected with Seraphim of Sarov.
