= Walter Haenisch =

German Marxist philologist

Walter Haenisch (11 December 1906, Dortmund – 16 June 1938, Butovo) was a Marxist theoretician and the son of German SPD politician Konrad Haenisch.

== Life ==
Haenisch did his Abitur at the famous Karl-Marx-Schule in Neukölln. He studied English literature, partly at the University of Reading. He became a member of the Communist Party (KPD) in 1931 and moved to Moscow, where he initially participated in Marx-Engels-Gesamtausgabe, the ambitious project of a complete edition of the works of Marx and Engels. In 1935 Walter Haenisch was laid off (there were accusations of "social democratic leanings" against him) and subsequently wrote several articles in "Internationale Literatur", for example on William Cobbett, and a famous article on the impact of Percy Shelley on Marxism, which was published in Das Wort (edited by Lion Feuchtwanger and Bert Brecht). He also published an article on Marx and the Democratic Association of 1847 in one of the first editions of "Science and Society", the leading Marxist publication in the USA. Haenisch's connections to Western countries and culture as well as the earlier accusations which led to his dismissal from Marx-Engels-Institute raised the suspicion of the NKVD, which arrested him in March, 1938. In June, 1938, Haenisch was sentenced to death for "espionage" (like thousands of German communists) and subsequently shot at Butovo firing range and interred in a mass grave there.

Haenisch was married to Gabriele Bräuning, who was deported to Uzbekistan in 1941 and returned to the GDR in 1954. She later married German geologist Friedrich Stammberger, worked as a lecturer for Dietz Verlag Berlin, was a lifelong member of SED (and successors PDS and Linkspartei) and died in 2005.

== Literature on Haenisch and his reception ==
- Gabriele Stammberger, Michael Peschke: Gut angekommen – Moskau. Das Exil der Gabriele Stammberger 1932–1954. Basisdruck Verlag, Berlin 1999, ISBN 3-86163-082-6 (memoirs of Haenischs widow, especially pp. 101–110 containing a self-written CV of Haenisch)
- Robert Kaufman: Intervention & Commitment Forever! Shelley in 1819, Shelley in Brecht, Shelley in Adorno, Shelley in Benjamin: In: Reading Shelley's Interventionist Poetry 1819-1820: (Michael Scrivener, ed.): "Romantic Circles", University of Maryland, USA (mentions Haenisch's Shelley essay in Paragraphs 6 to 12) online
- Andrew Benjamin: Walter Benjamin and Art: Bloomsbury Academic, 2005, ISBN 9780826467294 ( on Haenisch's Shelley essay, S. 134-135 )
