= Nikolay Motovilov =

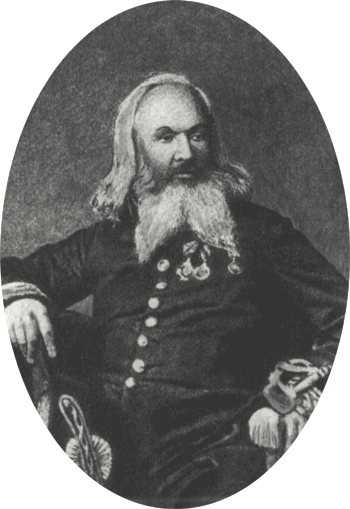
Nikolay Motovilov

Nikolay Aleksandrovich Motovilov (Russian: Николай Александрович Мотовилов; 3 May 1809 – 14 January 1879) was a Russian landowner, Justice of the Peace, businessman and Fool for Christ. He is primarily known as the first biographer of Saint Seraphim of Sarov. In Russian Orthodox tradition he is often referred as the Servant to Seraphim and the Theotokos.

Motovilov was born in Simbirsk to a noble family, and graduated from Kazan University. According to his notes, he once tried to commit suicide by drowning in Chyornoye Lake near Kazan, but was stopped by an apparition of the Theotokos, whom he claimed to have led him throughout the remainder of his life. Motovilov became acquainted with Saint Seraphim of Sarov and became one of his disciples.

Cover of Motovilov's book Serafim's Discourse On the Purpose of the Christian Life shows how the event is usually depicted in the modern icon tradition

Motovilov wrote down many of his conversations with St. Seraphim, including his favorite, Seraphim's Talk On the Purpose of the Christian Life, that occurred in November 1831 in the forest near Sarov. This event has been depicted in several different icons of St. Seraphim, and is considered one of modern Orthodoxy's most important spiritual treasures.

In 1827 Motovilov started government work in Simbirsk. He had a conflict with Freemasons there, and was arrested and imprisoned in 1832 on trumped-up charges. Motovilov later claimed that these charges were fabricated by his Freemason enemies, including Aleksey Petrovich Yermolov. In 1833, Motovilov was released from prison by order of Tsar Nicholas I of Russia, but lost all chances for employment with the government thereafter.

In 1840 Motovilov married Yelena Ivanovna Meliukova, the niece of a pupil of St. Seraphim, schemo-nun Marfa, and settled down on his estate near Simbirsk. Here he worked ceaselessly to glorify the name of Seraphim, who had died in 1833. Motovilov wrote numerous letters to important personages, including the Emperor himself, endeavoring to demonstrate the depths of Seraphim's prophetic gift and philosophy. He also organized large business ventures such as the Svyato-Preobrazhensky Bank, assisting in the migration of "millions of peasants" from Central Russia to Siberia. Motovilov spent the proceeds of his ventures on the Serafimo-Diveevsky Monastery. Acquiring the nickname The breadwinner of Diveyevo Monastery (Питатель Дивеевского Монастыря), Motovilov increasingly behaved as a Fool for Christ, with neighbors considering him mentally ill. He died in 1879, and was buried at Serafimo-Diveyevsky Monastery.

Seraphim of Sarov, whose name Motovilov had worked so hard to bring to Russian public awareness, was canonized in 1903. He remains one of the modern Orthodox Church's most beloved saints.

Motovilov's manuscripts were mostly left unpublished, and were stored in disarray in baskets kept in the attic of his house. In 1903 Motovilov's widow passed the baskets with the manuscripts—by now filled with feathers and chicken droppings—to the religious writer Sergei Nilus. Nilus eventually found a way to decipher the materials and published them. Motovilov's materials became the main source for the biography and teaching of St. Seraphim, the teachings of St. Anthonius of Voronezh, founder of Serafimo-Diveevsky Monastery, and nun Alexandra of Diveyevo. Motovilov's writings also strongly influenced the works of Nilus.

In one of Nilus’ books "On the banks of God’s river" we find a prediction of Seraphim Sarovsky, made by Nikolay Motovilov. It is known as “The Great Mystery of Diveevo”. It says that rev. Seraphim would be taken to heaven before his due time to be later resurrected by God in the times of a neglect of Christian belief. After his resurrection, he will start the world-wide Sermon of repentance
