= Sukhanovka =

Sukhanovka (Russian: Сухановка) is the name of several rural localities in Russia:

- Sukhanovka, Penza Oblast, a selo in Yasnopolyansky Selsoviet of Kuznetsky District of Penza Oblast
- Sukhanovka, Dalnerechensky District, Primorsky Krai, a selo in Dalnerechensky District, Primorsky Krai
- Sukhanovka, Khasansky District, Primorsky Krai, a railway station in Khasansky District, Primorsky Krai
- Sukhanovka, Pskov Oblast, a village in Nevelsky District of Pskov Oblast
- Sukhanovka, Sverdlovsk Oblast, a selo in Artinsky District of Sverdlovsk Oblast
- Sukhanovka, Tula Oblast, a village in Fedorovskaya Rural Administration of Uzlovsky District of Tula Oblast
