= Diveyevo Convent =

Monastery in Russia

Coordinates: 55°2′24″N 43°14′41″E

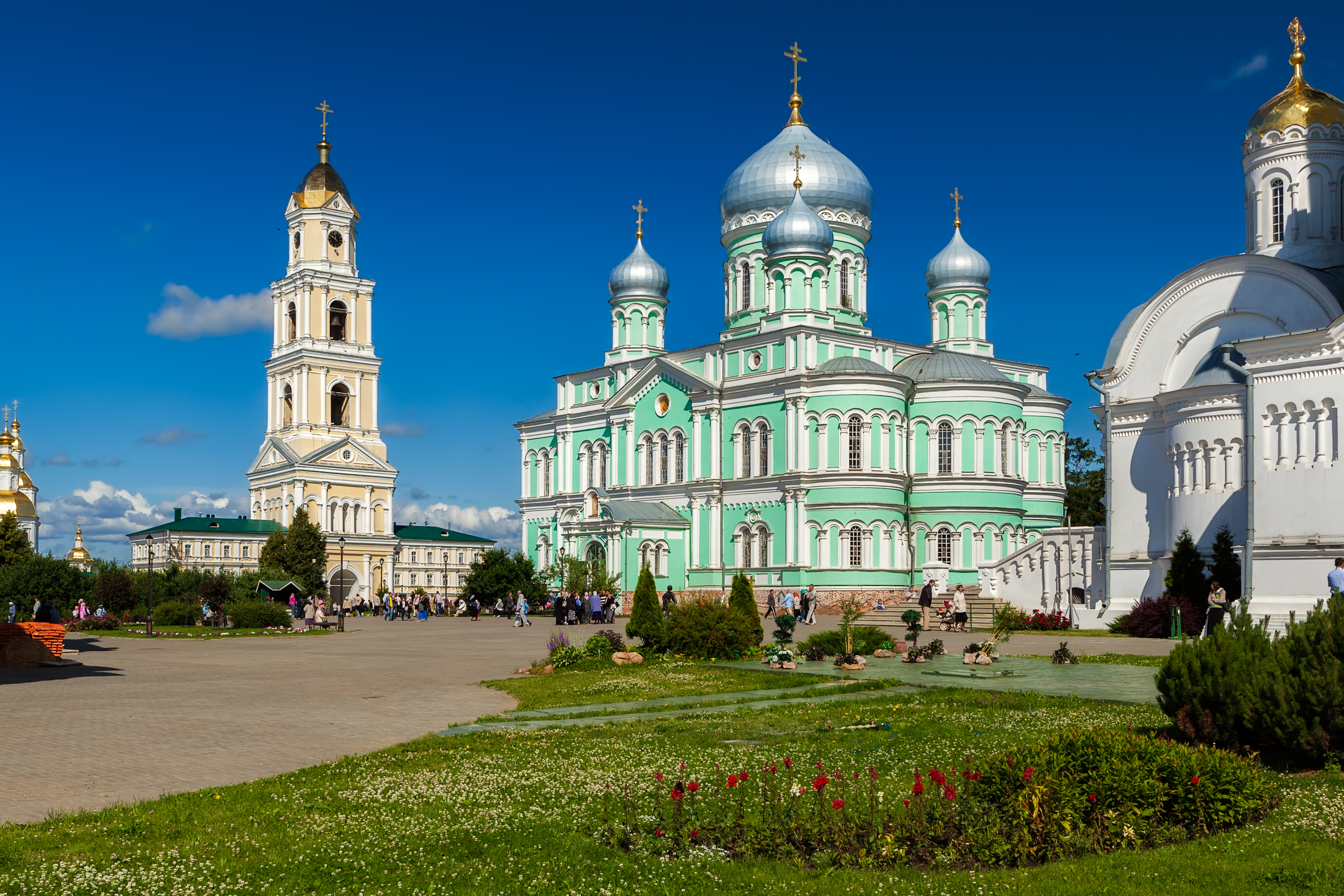
The five-domed katholikon is dedicated to the Holy Trinity

Serafimo-Diveevsky Monastery, or Saint Seraphim-Diveyevo Monastery, or Holy Trinity-Saint Seraphim-Diveyevo Monastery (Russian: Свя́то-Тро́ицкий Серафи́мо-Диве́евский монасты́рь) is a monastery of nuns (convent) in Diveyevo settlement near Sarov (12 km), and near the city of Nizhny Novgorod (185 km), in the Nizhny Novgorod Oblast, Russia. It is situated in a region considered to have immense spiritual significance. Within its immediate vicinity are situated two other cloisters: Sarov Monastery and Sanaksar Monastery.

The convent is famous because Saint Seraphim of Sarov served as Staretz (Elder) for the nuns of this monastery, though he only travelled to the convent once during his lifetime. He was a monk at the nearby monastery of Sarov. After the fall of communism, his relics, which had been feared lost, were discovered in the storeroom of a "museum of atheism" in Saint Petersburg and solemnly transferred to the Seraphim-Diveyevo monastery, which has come to be named after him.

The monastery is also famous for possessing the only portrait of Saint Seraphim that was painted of him by a contemporary, the "Diveyevo Portrait". During the years of Communist persecution, the portrait was smuggled out of Russia and is kept to this day in the Novo-Diveyevo Convent in Nanuet, New York.

The convent is a subject of the writings of Serge Nilus in his semi-autobiographical work Velikoe v malom i antikhrist, a work which has the dubious distinction of having been published, in book form, for the first time as the Protocols of the Elders of Zion (which is only its last chapter, Chapter XII).

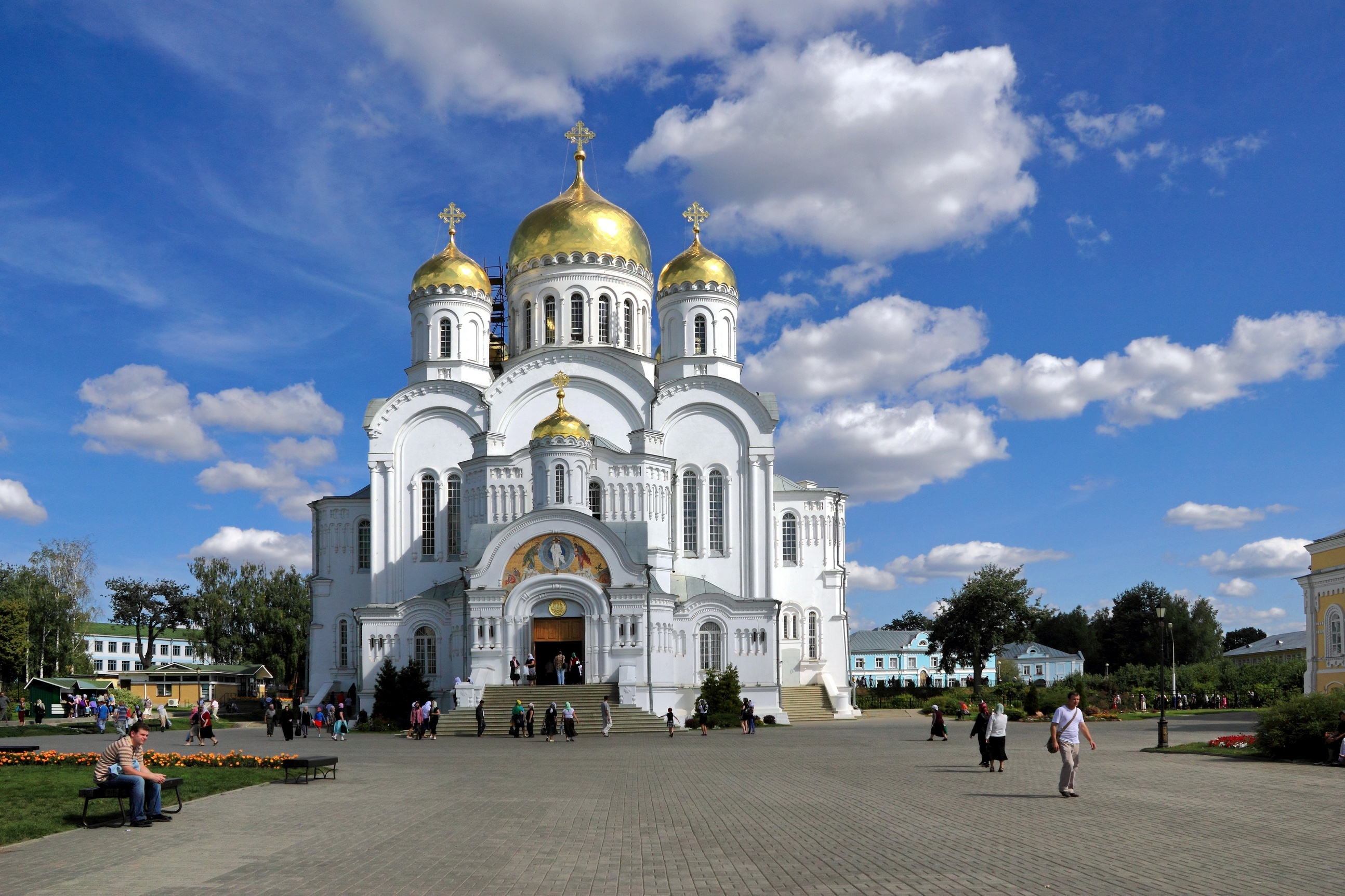
The new katholikon was built in 1907-1916 to designs by Anatoly Antonov

The monastery started with the Church of Our Lady of Kazan (Kazanskaya), built in 1773–1780. Saint Seraphim blessed the construction of two churches adjoined to Kazanskaya: The Church of the Nativity of Christ (1829) and the Church of the Nativity of Theotokos (1830). The large Trinity Cathedral with its bell tower was constructed in 1865–1875.

The Office of the Hegumenia (Abbess) with it Mary Magdalen House Church and the Alexander Nevsky Trapeza Church were built in the end of the 19th century. Finally. The Transfiguration Cathedral was built in 1907–1916. In 2003-2004 there were significant restoration works in the Monastery celebrating 250 year anniversary of Saint Seraphim.

== See also ==
- Nikolay Motovilov
