= Takács =

Origin
- Region of origin: Hungary

Other names
- Variant forms: Tcaci, Tkach, Tkalec, Kadlec, Tkachyov, Tkachuk, Tkachenko, Tkacz

Takács is a Hungarian language occupational surname. It comes from Hungarian "takács" ("weaver"), which is derived from Slavic *tъkačь. Spelling variants include Takacs, Takach, Takats, and Takac. Notable people with the surname include:

- Ákos Takács (born 1982), Hungarian footballer
- Albert Takács (born 1955), Hungarian politician and jurist
- András Takács (1945–2015), Hungarian cyclist and speed skater
- André De Takacs (1879/80–1919), Hungarian-American illustrator
- Attila Takács (1929–2011), Hungarian gymnast
- Basil Takach (1879–1948), American bishop
- Béla Takács (born 1974), Hungarian footballer
- Bence Gundel-Takács (born 1998), Hungarian footballer
- Bogi Takács (born 1983), Hungarian writer
- Boglárka Takács (born 2001), Hungarian athlete
- Cristina Takacs-Vesbach (born 1968), American microbial ecologist
- Dalma Takács (1933–2016), Hungarian-American novelist
- Dávid Takács (born 1986), Hungarian middle-distance runner
- Dusmáta Takács (born 1986), Hungarian handball player
- Elemér Takács (born 1889), Hungarian sport shooter
- Éva Takács (1780–1845), Hungarian publisher, writer and feminist
- Fruzsina Takács (born 1992), Hungarian handball player
- Gábor Takács (1959–2007), Hungarian sprint canoeist
- Gábor Takács-Nagy (born 1956), Hungarian violinist and conductor
- George Takach (born 1957), Canadian lawyer
- Gyula Takács (1914–2007), Hungarian field handball player
- Imre Takács, Hungarian-Canadian environmental engineer
- István Takács (born 2000), Hungarian Greco-Roman wrestler
- János Takács (1954–2025), Hungarian table tennis player
- János Takács (born 1963), Hungarian wrestler
- Jenő Takács (1902–2005), Hungarian-born Austrian composer
- József Takács (1904–1983), Hungarian footballer
- József Takács (1884–1961), Hungarian politician
- Judit Takács, Hungarian sociologist, researcher and university professor
- Judy Takács (born 1962), American contemporary figurative painter
- Júlia Takács (born 1989), Spanish athlete
- Jusztin Nándor Takács (1927–2016), Hungarian priest
- Károly Takács (1910–1976), Hungarian shooter
- Katalin Takács (born 1974), Hungarian swimmer
- Kincső Takács (born 1993), Hungarian canoer
- Krisztián Takács (born 1985), Hungarian swimmer
- Ladislav Takács (born 1996), Czech footballer
- Lajos Takács (1924–2015), Hungarian mathematician
- László Takács (footballer, born 1955), Hungarian footballer
- Gyula Takács (born 1985), Hungarian radiologic technologist
- Marcell Takács (born 1989), Hungarian footballer
- Miklós Takács (1906–1967), Hungarian politician
- Orsolya Takács (born 1985), Hungarian water polo player
- Paul Takac (born 1965), American politician
- Péter Takács, multiple people
- Rareș Takács (born 1991), Romanian footballer
- Robby Takac (born 1964), American musician
- Ronald Takács (born 1998), Hungarian footballer
- Sándor Takács (1893–1932), Hungarian chess master
- Sándor Takács (1947–2012), Hungarian handball player
- Silvester Takač (born 1940), Serbian footballer
- Silvia Kumpan-Takacs (born 1979), Austrian politician
- Tamara Takács (born 1996), Hungarian canoeist
- Tamás Takács, multiple people
- Tibor Takács, multiple people
- William Takacs (born 1973), American trumpeter
- Zoltán Felvinczi Takács (1880–1964), Hungarian art historian
- Zoltán Takács, multiple people
- Zsombor Takács (born 1999), Hungarian footballer

== See also ==
- Takács Quartet
- Takácsi
- Tkaczew
- Tkalec
