= Tkach =

Origin
- Region of origin: Eastern Europe

Other names
- Variant forms: Tcaci, Takács, Tkalec, Kadlec, Tkachyov, Tkachuk, Tkachenko, Tkacz

Tkach is a Slavic surname meaning "weaver". It is a common surname in Ukraine, as well as in Russia, Belarus, Poland, Slovakia, Czech Republic and Serbia. Notable people with the surname include:

- Anna Tkach (born 1975), Russian-born Israeli sprinter
- Elena Tkach (born 1970), Russian sport shooter
- Joseph W. Tkach (1927–1995), American religious figure
- Joseph Tkach, Jr. (born 1951), American religious figure, son of Joseph W. Tkach
- Kristina Tkach (born 1999), Russian pool player
- Lyubov Tkach (born 1993), Russian athlete
- Mikhail Tkach (1895–unknown), Ukrainian-born American spy
- Roman Tkach (born 1962), Ukrainian politician
- Serhiy Tkach (1952–2018), Russian-born Ukrainian serial killer
- Svetlana Tkach (born 1969), Moldovan runner
- Walter R. Tkach (1917–1989), American physician
- Yaroslav Tkach (born 2001), Ukrainian speed climber
- Yuliya Tkach (born 1989), Ukrainian Olympic wrestler
- Yuriy Tkach (born 1983), Ukrainian comedian
- Zlata Tkach (1928–2006), Moldovan composer
