= Tcaciuc =

Tcaciuc is a surname which is the Romanian respelling of Tkachuk. Notable people with the surname include:

- Andrei Tcaciuc (born 1982), Moldavian footballer
- Vasile Tcaciuc (c. 1900–1935), Romanian serial killer

== See also ==
- Tcaci
