= Oleksandr Tkachenko =

Oleksandr or Aleksandr Tkachenko may refer to:

- Oleksandr Tkachenko (politician, born 1939) (1939–2024), Ukrainian politician
- Oleksandr Tkachenko (footballer, born 1947), Soviet international footballer
- Oleksandr Tkachenko (footballer, born 1993), Ukrainian football goalkeeper
- Oleksandr Tkachenko (politician, born 1984)
- Oleksandr Tkachenko (rower) (1960–2015), Soviet Olympic rower
- Oleksandr Tkachenko (journalist) (born 1966), Ukrainian journalist and politician
- Oleksandr Tkachenko (soldier) (1989–2023) was a Ukrainian soldier.
- Aleksandr Tkachenko (poet), Russian footballer and poet, see Novaya Yunost
- Aleksandr Tkachenko (boxer) (born 1955), Soviet Olympic boxer
- Alexandre Tkatchenko (physicist)
- Aleksandr Tkachenko (skier) (born 1971), Belarusian Olympic skier

== See also ==
- Tkachenko
