= Volodymyr Tkachenko =

Volodymyr Tkachenko may refer to:

- Volodymyr Tkachenko (swimmer), a Soviet Olympian from Kiev represented the Armed Forces sports club (SKA)
- Volodymyr Tkachenko (footballer), a Ukrainian footballer

== See also ==
- Tkachenko, a surname
- Vladimir Tkachenko, a Soviet basketball player from Sochi represented the Armed Forces sports club (SKA)
