= Tkachyov =

Tkachyov (Russian: Ткачёв; feminine Tkachyova, Ткачёва; also transliterated as Tkachev/Tkacheva) is a Russian surname, derived from the word ткач ("weaver"). Notable people with the surname include:

- Alexander Tkachyov (disambiguation), multiple people
- Alexandra Annenskaya (née Tkachyova; 1840–1915), Russian translator and writer
- Alexey Tkachev (born 1989), Russian track cyclist
- Angelina Tkatcheva, Belarusian cimbalist
- Anton Tkachev (born 1994), Russian politician
- Ilya Tkachyov (born 1982), Russian footballer
- Ivan Tkachev (1896–1938), Soviet military commander
- Mariia Tkacheva (born 2001), Russian tennis player
- Mikhail Tkachev (1912–2008), Soviet and Russian painter
- Oleh Tkachov (born 1962), Ukrainian sport shooter
- Peter Andreevich Tkachev, Soviet TsNIITochMash engineer and Hero of Socialist Labour
- Pyotr Tkachev (1844–1886), Russian revolutionary
- Sergei Tkachyov (born 1989), Russian footballer
- Svetlana Tkacheva (born 1984), Russian ice hockey player
- Vladimir Tkachyov (disambiguation), multiple people
- Vladislav Tkachiev (born 1973), Kazakh-French chess player
- Vyacheslav Tkachov, Russian general and writer.

== See also ==
- Tkachyov (village), a village (khutor) in the Republic of Adygea, Russia
