= Tkaczuk =

Tkaczuk is the Polish-language variant of the Ukrainian surname Tkachuk. Notable people with the surname include:

- Cezary Tkaczuk (born 1963), Polish professor of agricultural sciences, university professor, expert in plant protection
- Daniel Tkaczuk (born 1979), Canadian ice hockey player
- Kazimierz Tkaczuk (died 1950), Polish World War II soldier and post-World War II anti-communist Polish resistance fighter
- Wacław Tkaczuk (1942–2018), Polish journalist, literary critic, poet
- Walt Tkaczuk (born 1947), German-born Canadian ice hockey player

== See also ==
- Józef Tkaczuk phenomenon, Polish graffiti phenomenon similar to Kilroy was here
