= Matrona the Barefoot =

Russian wanderer (1833–1911)

- Матрона Босоножка
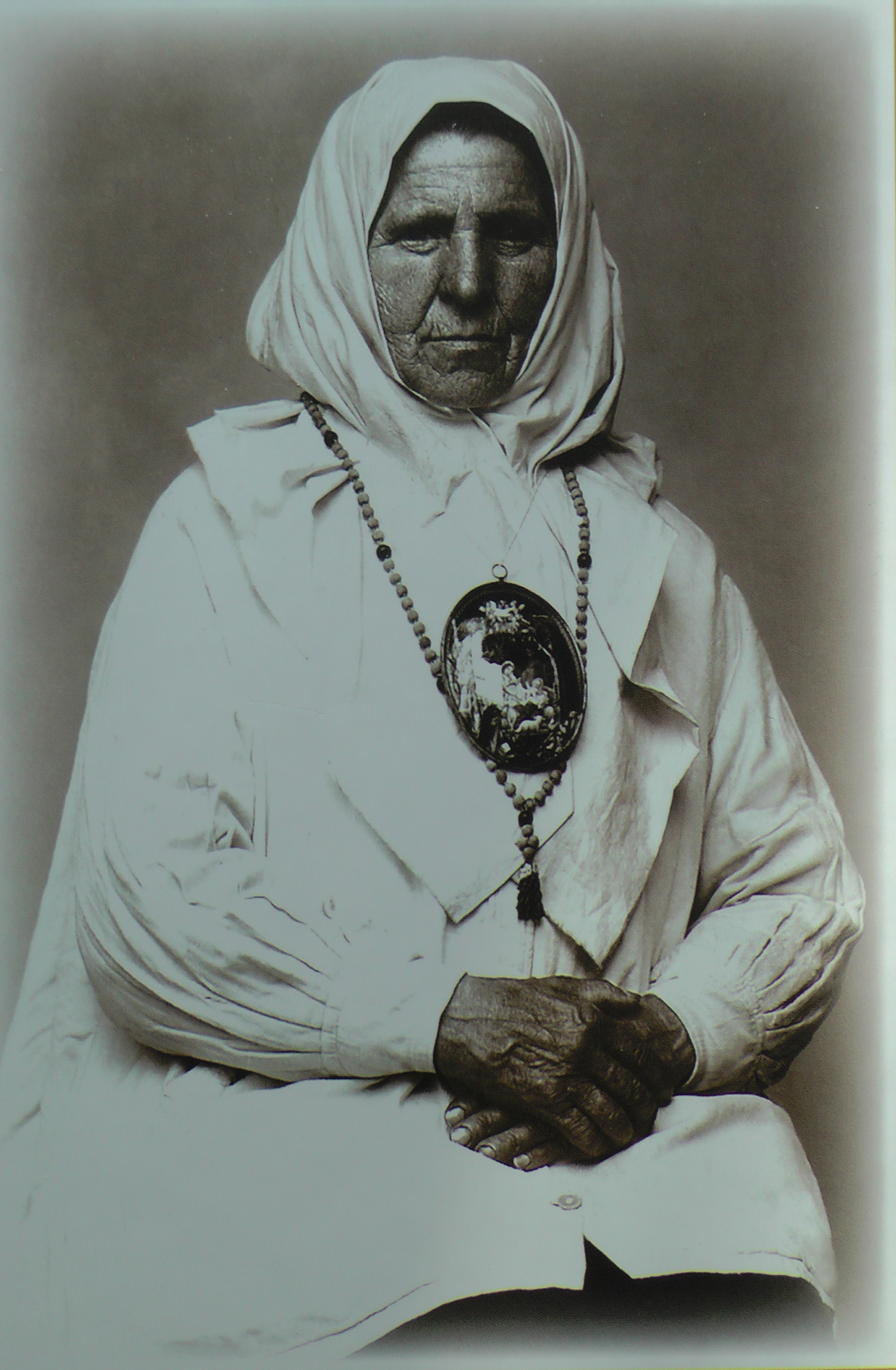
- Matrona as photographed by Karl Bulla, before 1911
- Born: Matrona Petrovna Scherbina; 1833; Vanino village, Odelevskaya volost, Nerekhtsky Uyezd, Kostroma Governorate, Russian Empire
- Died: 30 March 1911 (aged 77–78); Saint Petersburg, Russian Empire
- Occupation: Wanderer
- Spouses: Ivan Fyodorov Rumyantsev (m. 1850; died 1870); Egor Tikhonovich Mylnikov; (after 1870–1877 – 1878)
- Children: 2

Matrona the Barefoot (Russian: Матрона Босоножка; also known as Matrona of Petersburg, born Matrona Petrovna Shcherbinina, (Note: In this name that follows East Slavic naming customs, the patronymic is Petrovna and the family name is Shcherbinina.) married name Rumyantseva in her first marriage and Mylnikova in her second marriage; 1833 – 30 March 1911) (Note: In the 19th century, the difference in the calculation of the Julian and Gregorian calendars was 12 days. In the 20th and 21st centuries the difference is 13 days.)) was a blessed Russian wanderer of the late 19th and early 20th centuries. She became widely known during her lifetime. Metropolitan Varsonofy of Saint Petersburg and Ladoga described her as having followed the paths of foolishness for Christ’s sake and wandering, attributing to her the abilities of foresight and miracle-working.

Among the notable figures of her time who were close to Matrona were John of Kronstadt and the wanderer Vasily the Barefoot. She maintained a long correspondence with the imperial family, and there is evidence of a personal meeting between her and Emperor Nicholas II. Shortly after her death, a pamphlet about her life was published in Saint Petersburg. In the 2010s, discussions about her possible canonization emerged, prompting the release of two books based on archival records of her life.

Photographs that capture her appearance were taken by renowned photographers of the time, including Karl Bulla. In the 2000s and 2010s, documentaries about her were released, exploring her life and legacy for a wider audience.

== Biography ==
=== Family life ===
Matrona (recorded as Matryona in the revision lists of Kostroma Governorate in 1834) was born in 1833 in the village of Vanino, Odelevskaya volost, Nerekhtsky Uyezd, Kostroma Governorate, to Pyotr Evstigneev and Agafya Nesterova Shcherbinin. (Note: Alexander Plotnikov, author of Matrona's biography published in 1912, believed that Nesterova was Agafya's maiden name. At the same time, Yurevichiene, based on archival documents, reports that Agafya was the daughter of Nester Ivanov from the village of Antonovo, born in 1780. Plotnikov did not know Matrona's date of birth.) She was baptized on 27 March 1833 in honor of the martyr Matrona of Thessalonica. She was from a peasant family. Some sources suggest her father may have originated from the nearby village of Shcherbinino or that the family belonged to the Shcherbatov princes before the abolition of serfdom. Matrona had an older brother, Alexander, and younger brothers, Ivan and Makar. (Note: Alexander Plotnikov names her three brothers in the following sequence: Makar, Alexander and Ivan.)

Matrona was baptized in the church in the village of Odoleevo. As a child, she may have heard stories about Simon of Yuryevets, a figure known in the region. While some accounts suggest that signs of a future calling to a distinctive path might appear in childhood or adolescence, no specific evidence of this exists for Matrona.

At the age of 17, in 1850, Matrona was married to Ivan Fyodorov Rumyantsev for 18 years. The family lived in the village of Antonovo, her husband's birthplace. By 1857, they had two sons: Andrey (5 years old) and Ivan (4 years old). (Note: About Matrona's children scanty information was preserved: Ivan lived in St. Petersburg separately from his mother, worked at Obukhov State Plant of the Marine Department since 1896 (with a small break in the spring and summer of 1897), he died in 1905, Andrew in 1898 was not alive.) During this time, Ivan Rumyantsev was conscripted into military service in 1855. Following his conscription, Matrona's status changed to that of a soldier's wife. As such, she may have either accompanied her husband to his place of service or taken up seasonal work, with the latter being more typical. Some sources propose that this shift in status may have freed Matrona from serfdom.

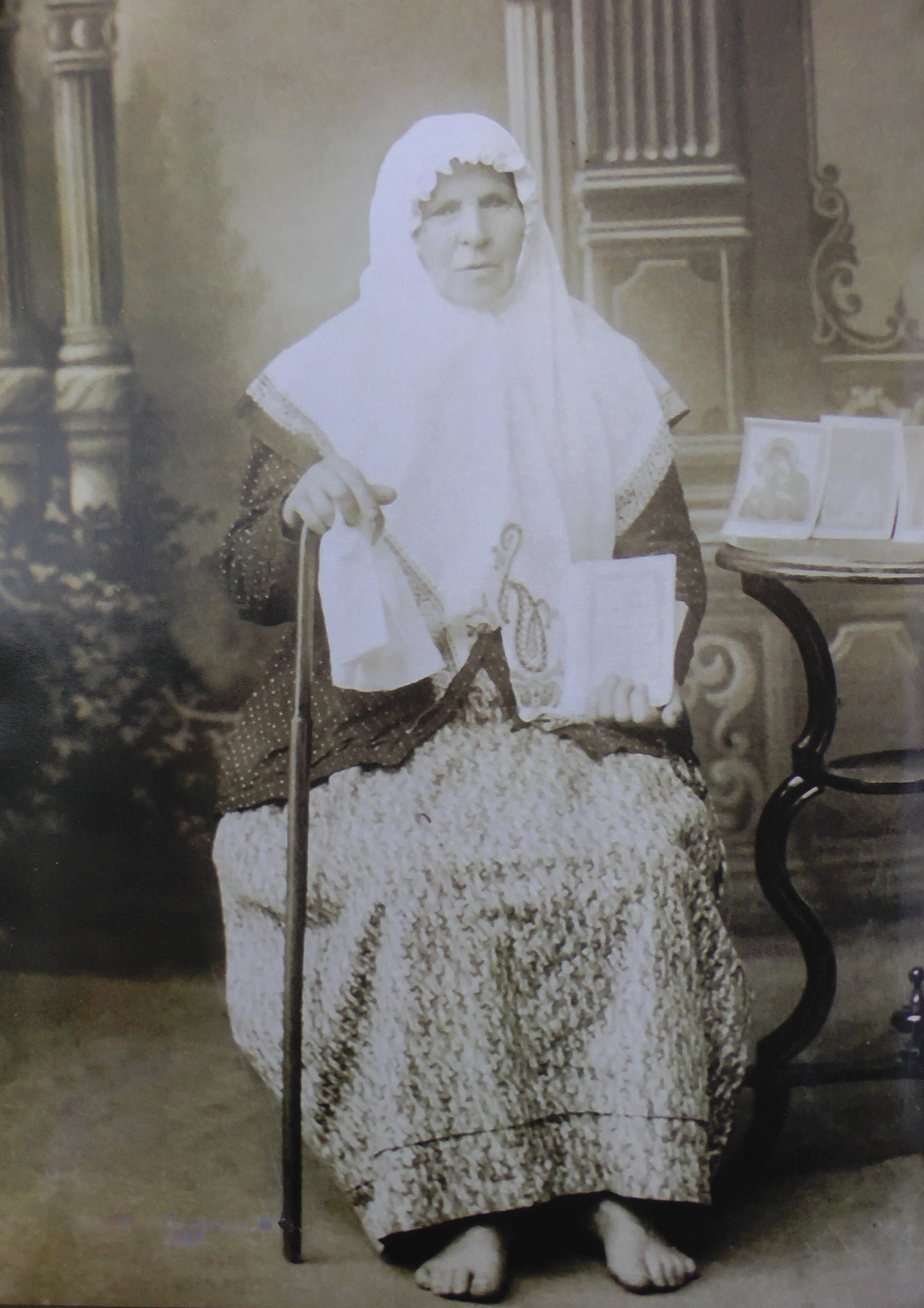
Unknown photographer. Matrona of St. Petersburg, 1897

Ivan returned from service in 1865 and died in 1870, reportedly his death due to alcoholism. As a widow with children, Matrona faced the choice of staying with her husband's family or obtaining a passport to seek work elsewhere. She opted to move to Kostroma for employment. There, she married a local townsman, Yegor Tikhonovich Mylnikov, and was registered as a townswoman herself. The Mylnikovs likely owned a grocery shop and a house on Sergievskaya Street in Kostroma. Sources describe this marriage as challenging for Matrona, though specific details vary. They had no children. Her second marriage elevated her social status from a peasant widow to a townswoman, distancing her from peasant life.

During the Russo-Turkish War of 1877–1878, Egor Mylnikov was drafted into the army. Matrona went with him to the combat zone as a nurse. The institution of nursing (Note: According to another version, she joined the nursery “saving herself”, as Plotnikov put it, from “great distress” that she had to endure from her husband.) emerged in Russia in the mid-19th century under European influence but developed under the Orthodox ideals of mercy. This role allowed Matrona to acquire medical skills and earn a wage. She received a salary of 25 rubles, which she reportedly gave to wounded soldiers. Although her name does not appear in the lists of nurses from Kostroma, among the items she presented to the heir to the throne in 1904 was a commemorative medal from the consecration of a church at the Shipka Pass, an indication that she may have been a volunteer during the war.

=== Ascetic life ===
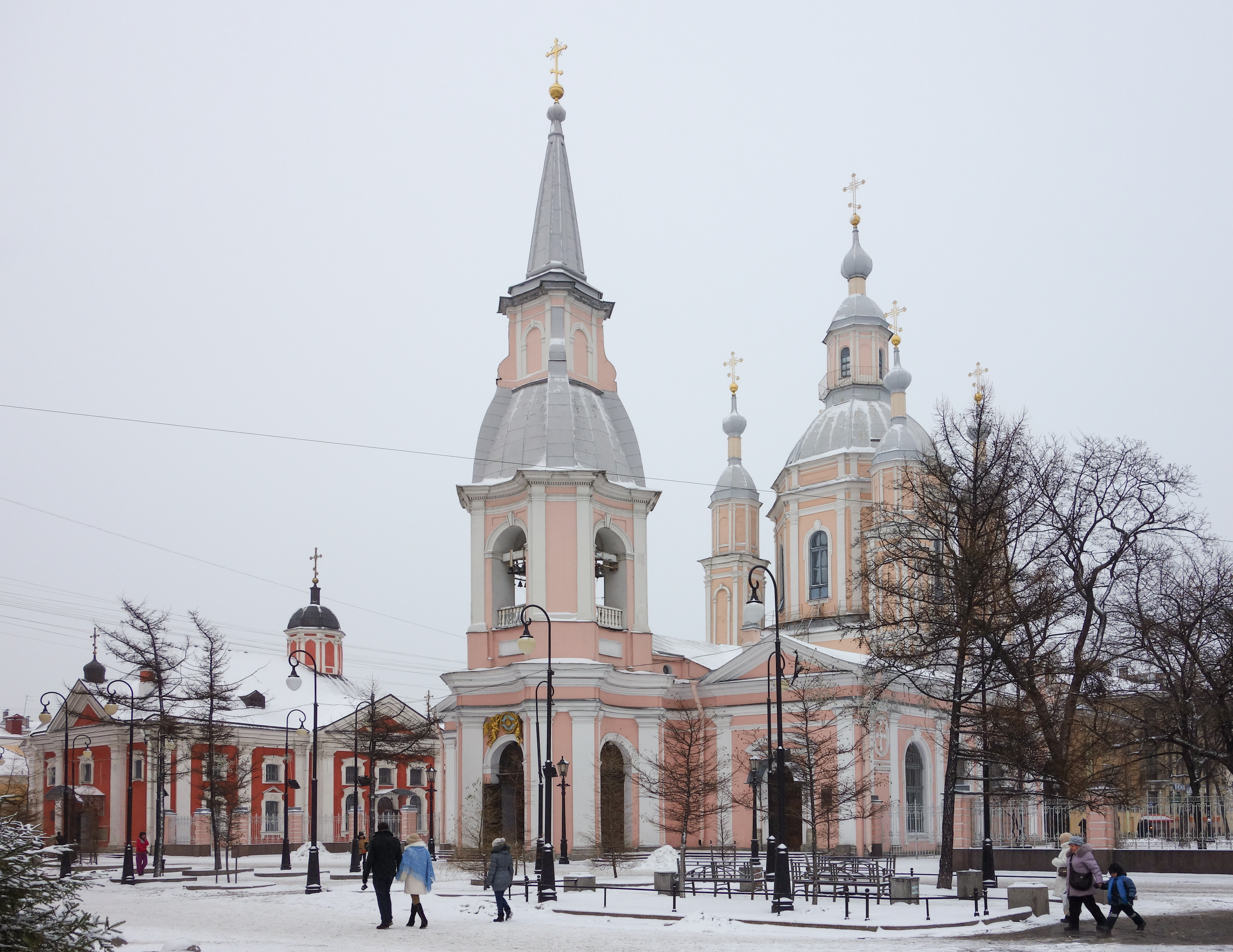
Saint Andrew's Cathedral, 2015

During the Russo-Turkish War, Matrona's husband, Yegor Mylnikov, died. After the war ended in 1878, she sold her property and distributed the proceeds. She then began a practice of barefoot wandering. Sources indicate she traveled extensively, reportedly visiting Jerusalem four times and making numerous trips to the Solovetsky Islands (her first destination), as well as Valaam, the Trinity-Sergius Lavra, the Sarov Hermitage, and other monasteries. She walked barefoot despite bad weather, wearing only white summer clothing. Matrona maintained friendship with two other well-known wanderers in the Russian Empire, Vasily the Barefoot and Alexander Dyomin.

Her lifestyle aligned with a form of religious asceticism known as wandering, often associated with pilgrimage to holy sites. This way of life typically involved leaving behind one's previous social standing, relying on alms or small earnings, and finding shelter in inns, private homes, or outdoors. Wanderers were expected to share stories of their travels and the shrines they visited, and Matrona's recorded narratives resemble traditional wanderer tales. Her barefoot wandering has been linked to additional practices, such as going without shoes, maintaining simplicity, and challenging social conventions, with her bare feet interpreted by some as a Christian symbol of humility.

Matrona wandered for about three years before settling in Saint Petersburg in 1881, possibly due to relatives there. Possible reasons for this move include the presence of relatives or her son in the city, though some point to Saint Petersburg's reputation as a center for unconventional religious figures, particularly women, from the 18th to early 20th centuries. Evidence of her healing and prophetic abilities emerged in the late 1890s, possibly after a long process of self-improvement through prayer and labor. People sought her help with employment and difficult situations.

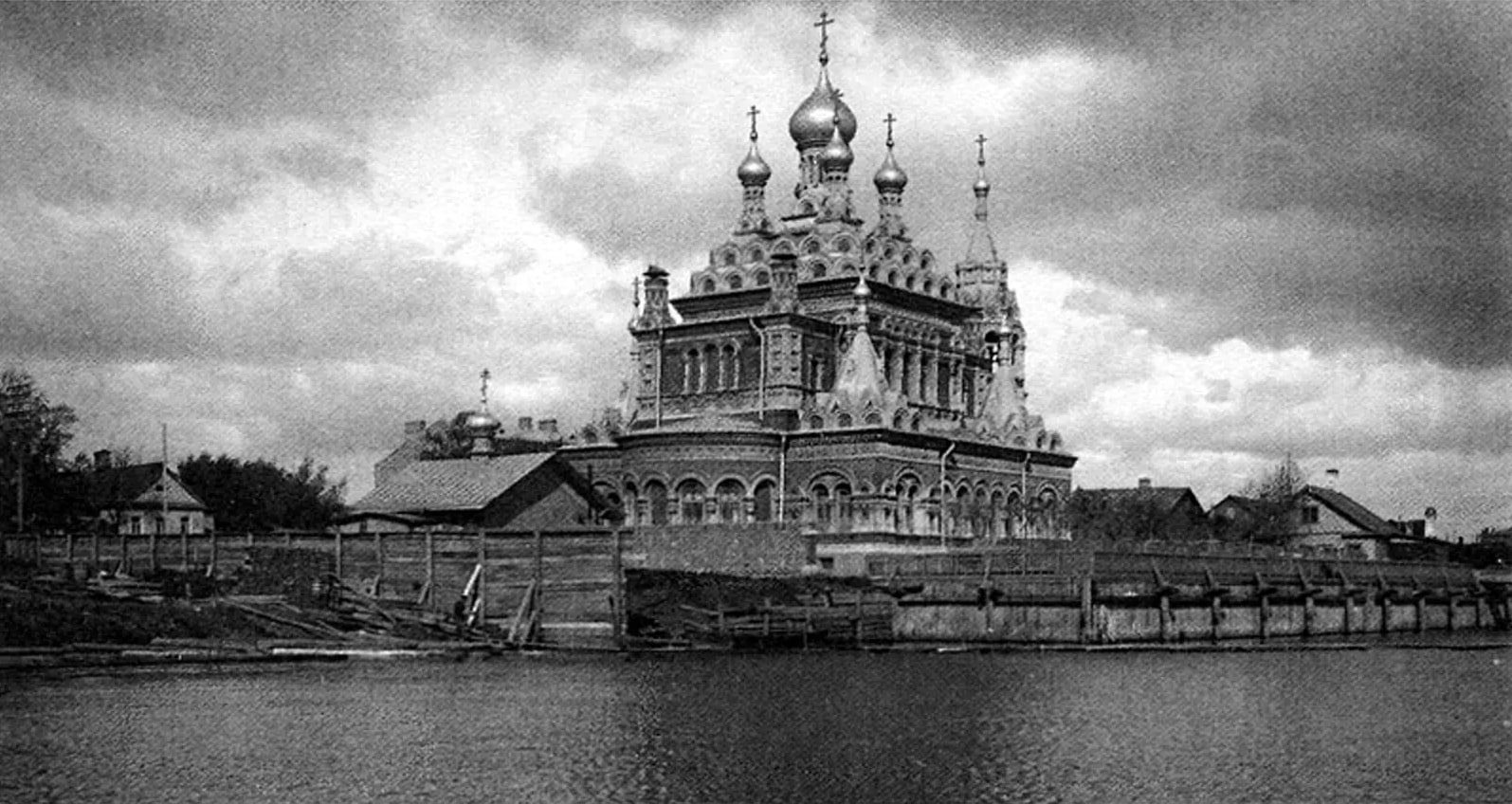
The Joy of All Who Sorrow's Church, 1900

In Saint Petersburg, Matrona was detained by police multiple times for walking barefoot. She submitted a petition to the Holy Synod requesting official permission to continue this practice, claiming that her ability to remain barefoot in cold weather was evidence of resilience, consistent with her religious views. She initially lived on the Petrograd Side, later on Vasilyevsky Island, regularly attending Saint Andrew's Cathedral, and eventually resided on Bolshaya Morskaya Street. Matrona became known as someone people turned to for advice on personal difficulties and for her reported healing abilities, with reports suggesting she received as many as 500 visitors on Mondays and Thursdays. Police reports noted crowds of up to 300 admirers gathering around her. Her popularity alarmed church authorities and police, leading to an investigation. In October 1897, the Spiritual Consistory ordered her parish clergy to monitor her religious beliefs, banning her from receiving visitors or collecting donations for oil and candles. In January 1898, she faced a magistrate for collecting funds without permission but was acquitted.

For the last 14 or 16 years of her life, Matrona lived near the Chapel of Our Lady of Sorrows at the Imperial Glass Factory beyond the Neva Gate, an industrial area with over 30 factories, poor sanitation, and widespread poverty and alcoholism. Together with Vasily the Barefoot, she raised funds to build a church there in honor of the icon Joy of All Who Sorrow. She also collected money for a church in the village of Feryazkino, Mikulinskaya volost, Staritsky Uyezd, Tver Governorate.

=== Death and burial ===
Matrona the Barefoot died on 30 March 1911. There were large crowds near her home for days, including people from all walks of life —beggars, factory workers, merchants, officials, and aristocrats— as well as many priests. Major newspapers reported on her death and farewell ceremonies daily. Her body was buried on 4 April 1911 behind the Chapel of Our Lady of Sorrows on the Neva River bank, attended by over 20,000 people. (Note: Natalia Chernykh and Svetlana Devyatova mentioned more than 25,000 people.)

Her initial burial included an underground crypt with a slab, covered by a mound adorned with spruce branches and a cross. Later, a wooden chapel with two windows was built over the grave, containing a low tombstone covered with a crimson cloth and a large white wooden cross inscribed: “Here rests the body of God’s servant, the eldress Matryona Petrovna Mylnikova (Matrenushka-bosonozhka), who died on March 30, 1911, at the age of 78. Peace to your ashes”. The chapel walls held many icons from Matrona's apartment. During the Soviet times, the burial site was leveled and covered with construction debris or industrial waste. (Note: Yurevichiene describes the fate of the grave differently: the rubber goods factory Gummilat placed its workshop in the chapel, near which the grave was located, and the burial place ended up under the production waste of this workshop.)

== Personality ==
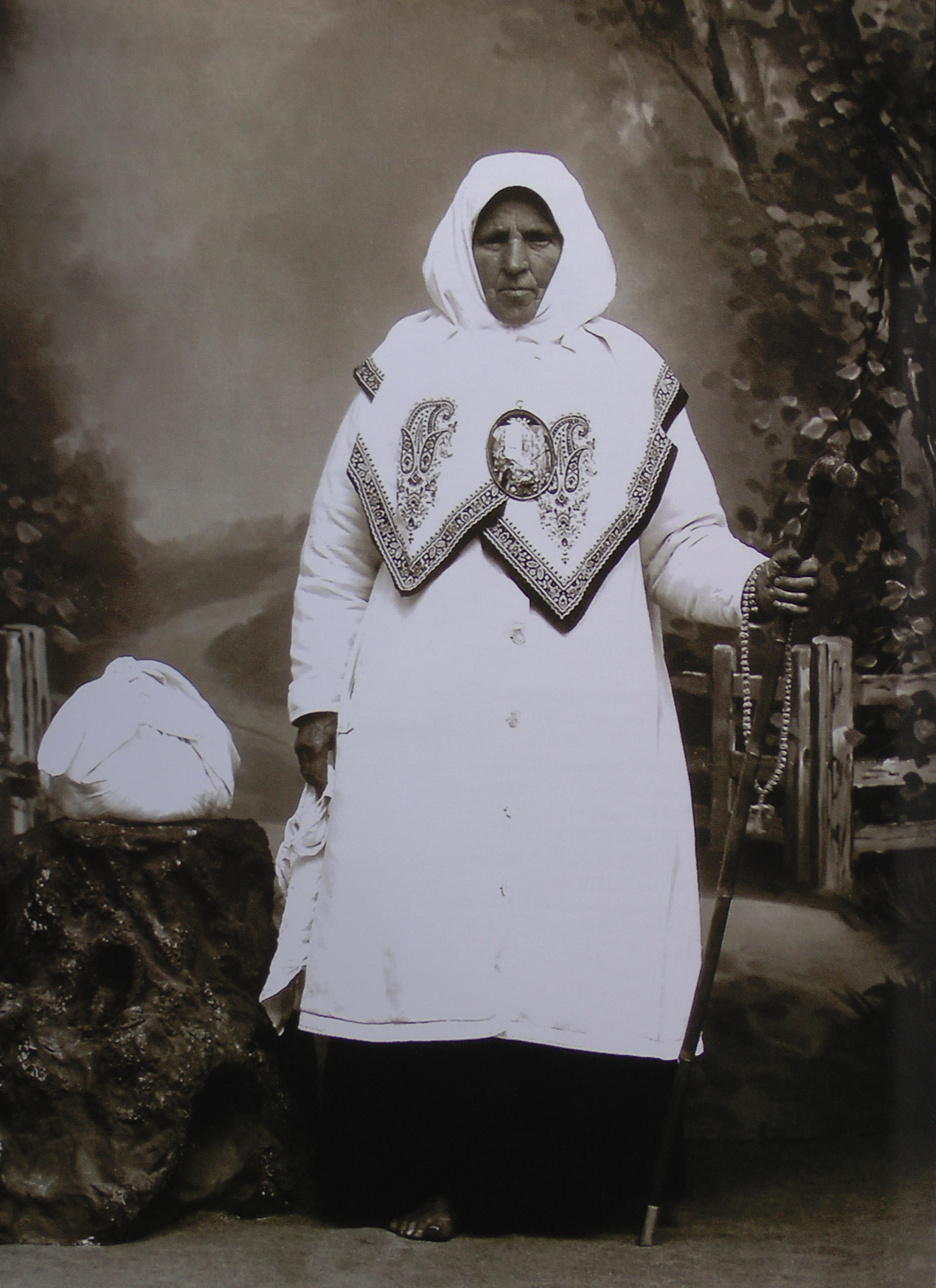
Karl Bulla (or his atelier). Matrona the Barefoot, before 1911

According to Natalia Mazalova, a Doctor of History, Matrona is viewed as a historical individual, a typical social figure of her time, and a subject of mythology. These perspectives often intertwine, contributing to numerous legends and a mythologized image of her.

She had good health conditions throughout most of her life while leading an ascetic lifestyle. A correspondent from the newspaper Gazette of the Saint Petersburg City Administration and Metropolitan Police described her diet as "consisting of a soup she cooked in a small cup and ate over several days, supplemented by soaked bread. She mixed tea and coffee in a teapot to quench her thirst, with prosphora as her only other sustenance".

She reportedly avoided bathing for 30 years, washing only her feet and head. Matrona immediately distributed money received from believers, stating she lived only for God and did not want money found on her after death. Her living quarters were described as a sparse room in a two-story log house, with a soot-covered ceiling and walls, where she slept on an iron bed with rags, illuminated only by altar lamps.

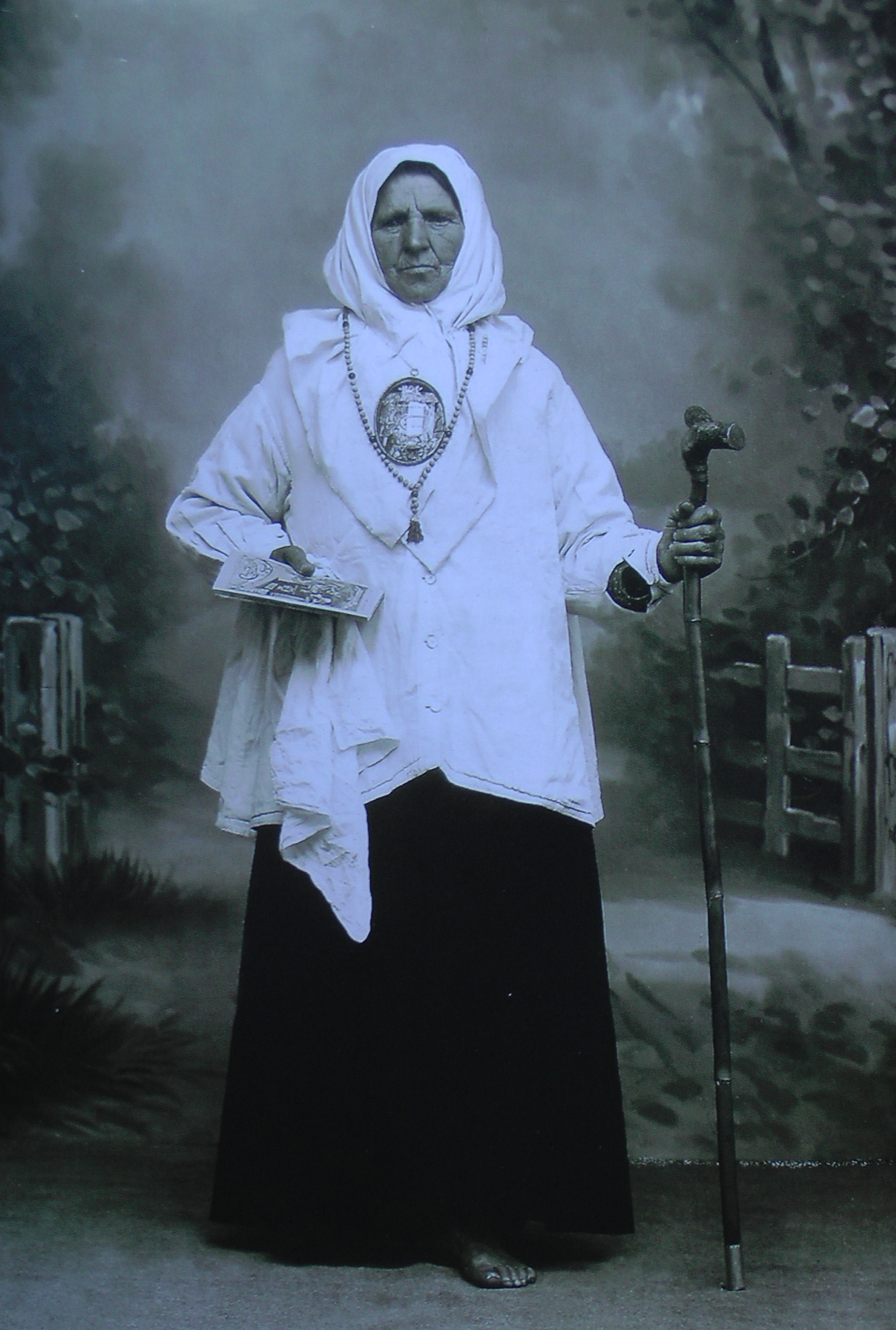
Karl Bulla (or his atelier). Portrait of wanderer Matrona the Barefoot, before 1911

Alexander Plotnikov reported that few passersby avoided visiting Matrona, with many seeking her out for support during personal hardships or illnesses. Visitors often came for advice or comfort, offering contributions ranging from a few kopecks to 500 rubles, which she reportedly redistributed to those in need or sent to monasteries and less affluent parishes.

Contemporaries believed she possessed the gift of foresight. Her admirers were mostly poor, though some came from the intelligentsia, middle classes, and high society. She is credited with predicting the fates of Prime Minister Pyotr Stolypin and Priamursky Governor-General Nikolay Gondatti. In 1910, she is said to have remarked, “Seven of my lamps have gone out [...] Something bad will happen in Russia”, which some later tied to the country's subsequent turmoil.

Accounts of healings attributed to her prayers include curing chronic alcoholics. She often sprinkled visitors with water —described by some as holy— and made gestures with an icon. Letters arrived from various parts of Russia, occasionally delivered to her in large quantities.

A priest from Saint Andrew's Cathedral observed that some visitors asked Matrona to predict their future, but she declined, explaining that she was neither a witch nor a fortune-teller, and instead offered to pray quietly with them in front of icons. She did not accept payment for these prayers, though she suggested contributions for lamp oil and candles if offered. She is recorded as having confessed to John of Kronstadt and received communion from him. A photograph captured her with John of Kronstadt during the laying of a merchant's house foundation in 1906.

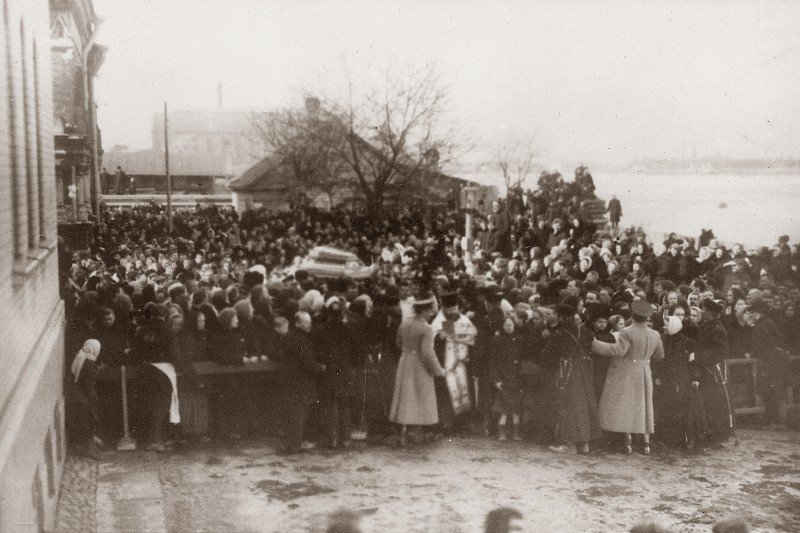
Matrona's funeral, 1911

The writer and Orthodox publicist Evgeny Poselyanin described a chance encounter with Matrona in his 1916 book In Prayer. In Silence and Storm. He depicted her as a barefoot woman with bright eyes, dressed in white, carrying a large wicker basket, and leaning on a heavy, metal-tipped staff. An influential acquaintance once intervened with the police on her behalf. Poselyanin admired her lack of formality and simplicity in conversation, which revolved around the death of a loved one and her bringing orphans to the capital. Passersby reacted to her with curiosity, mockery, pity, or awe.

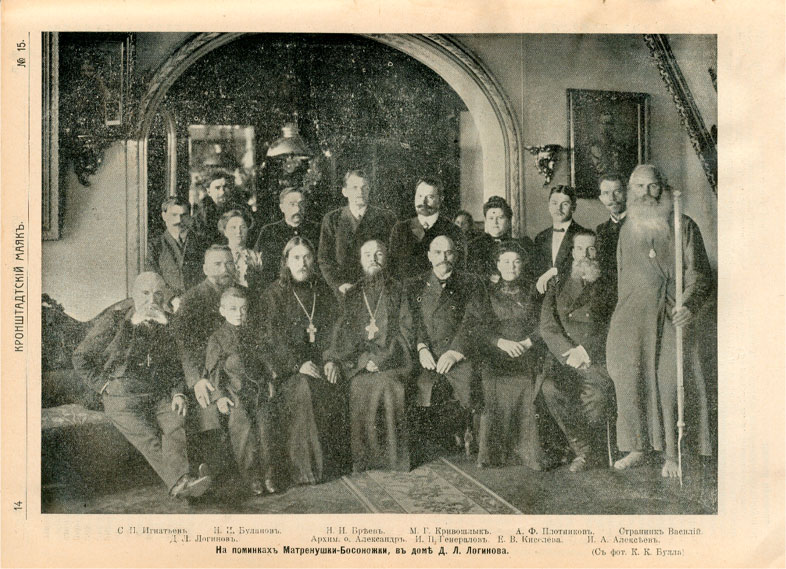
Karl Bulla. A page from the newspaper Kronstadtsky Mayak with a photo of those who attended Matrona the Barefoot's wake, 1911

Poselyanin observed that Matrona's unconventional behavior differed from the playful or satirical style of traditional wandering figures. Rather than criticizing social ills, she appeared to embody a model of self-denial, akin to a dramatic portrayal of an early historical figure. He linked her actions to a distinctive Saint Petersburg tradition of eccentricity and the era's growing unease about the Russian Empire's future.Comparing her to the holy fools of Ivan the Terrible's era who challenged authority and social norms, Poselyanin suggested that people saw in her a resilience, detachment from material concerns, and independence from worldly ties. Some turned to her for consolation rather than to the clergy, which Poselyanin interpreted as a sign of broader institutional shortcomings.

Since 1909, Matrona prepared for death, frequently receiving the Eucharist and undergoing unction several times in her final two years. An archimandrite at her funeral remarked that her religiosity embodied the simple faith of the Russian people and that she had taken on the spiritual feat of foolishness for Christ's sake.

== Relations with the Imperial Family ==
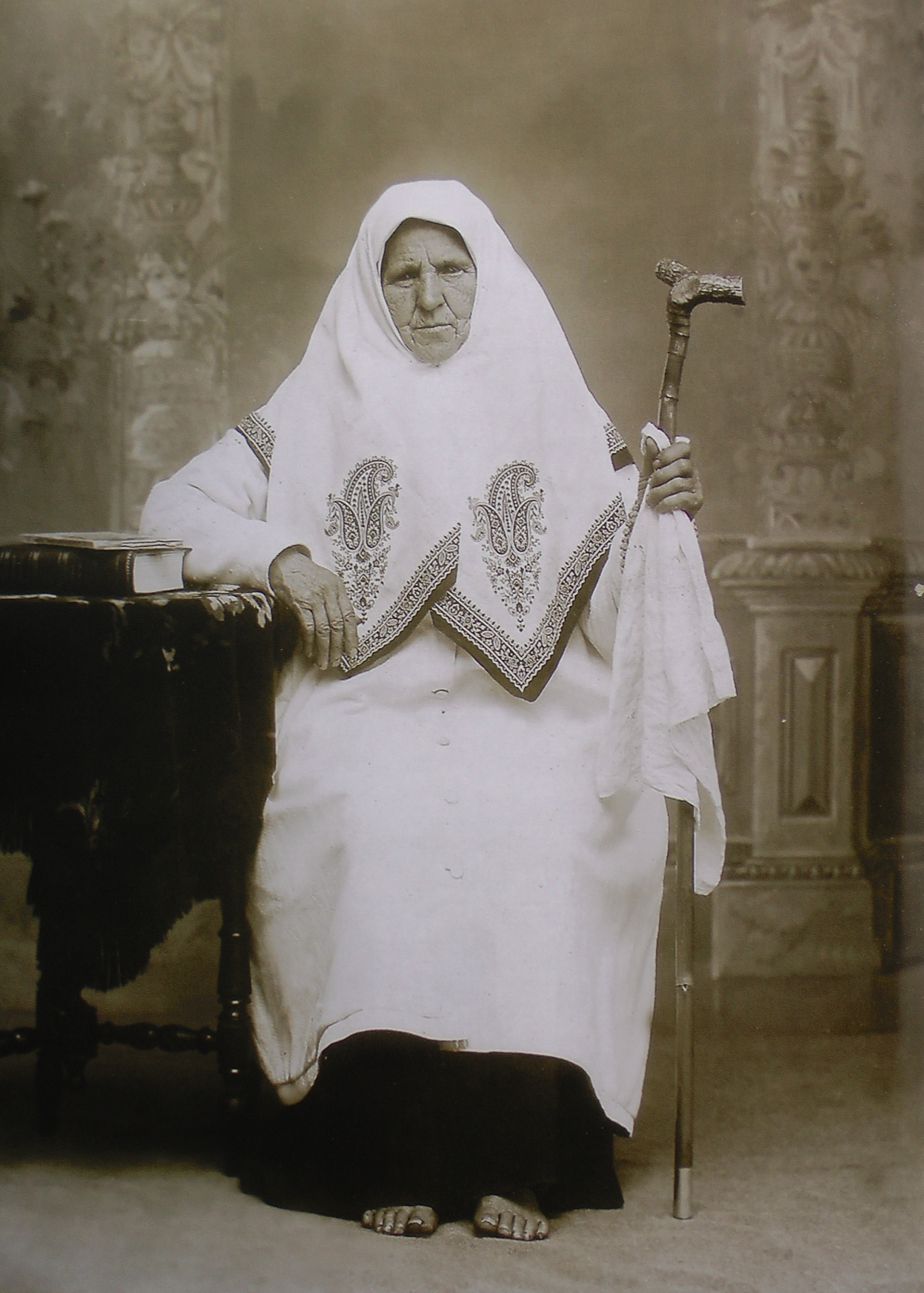
Karl Bulla (or an employee of his atelier). Matrona of St. Petersburg, before 1911

Documents from the Chancery of Her Imperial Majesty and the Ministry of the Imperial Court show that between 1896 and her death in 1911, Matrona sent gifts to the imperial family for religious holidays. These included icons, prosphora, lamp oil, and other church-related items. In 1901, an icon of Saint Nicholas the Wonderworker was returned to her, following a 1897 Consistory decision.

Some sources suggest that Matrona was personally introduced to the imperial family and had unrestricted access to the palace, with Nicholas II and Alexandra Fyodorovna listening to her for hours on end. Historians have called her a "fortune teller" with significant influence over the family, especially after the departure of another favorite, the Frenchman Nizier Anthelme Philippe. Media reports place her among the unconventional religious figures invited to Tsarskoe Selo before Rasputin's prominence. However, more reliable records indicate that Nicholas II's meetings with spiritual figures were typically one-off and private, such as a single instance when the Matrona presented him with an icon in Peterhof, according to Anna Vyrubova.

It is claimed that state leaders visited her for conversations, and Grand Duchess Elizabeth Fyodorovna regarded her highly, reportedly mourning her death and sending a wreath to her grave. In a 1904 letter to Nicholas II, Matrona offered a gilded iconostasis and candlestick, requesting permission and land to build an Alexeevsky Jerusalem Podvorye close to the Joy of All Who Sorrow Church to honor the heir's birth. (Note: However, Alexander Plotnikov claimed that the creation of the monastery was prevented by Matrona's death and that a few days after her death a group of devotees of the wanderer was formed with the aim of creating a monastery and transferring the remains of the deceased there in accordance with her will.) The Synod rejected her proposal due to unclear funding and lack of approval from the Patriarch of Jerusalem.

== Historical studies ==
=== Russian history and journalism ===
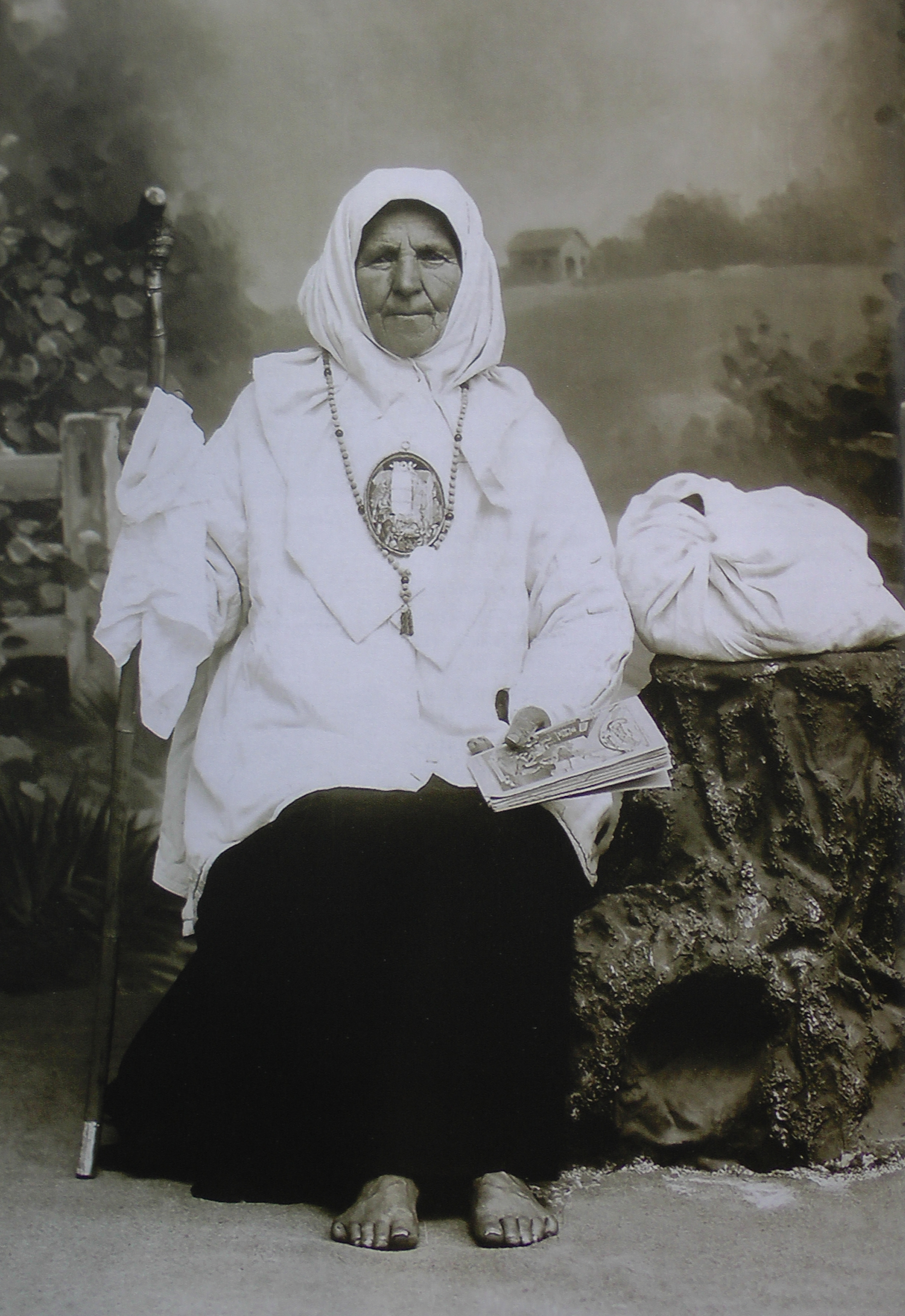
Karl Bulla (or photographer of his workshop). Matrona of St. Petersburg, before 1911

In 1912, a pamphlet titled The Life of the Reposed Servant of God, Eldress Matrona Petrovna Mylnikova (Matrenushka-Bosonozhka) was published in Saint Petersburg by Alexander Plotnikov, who knew her well and helped organize her funeral. Sergei Trufanov mentioned her in his memoirs about Rasputin, suggesting he could write a book about her if there was interest.

In 2009, Svetlana Devyatova dedicated a chapter to the Matrona in Orthodox Ascetic Women of the 20th Century. In 2011, the Holy Trinity Zelenetsky Monastery released Petersburg Eldress Matrenushka-Bosonozhka, blending Plotnikov's biography with a contemporary narrative based on archival and published sources. In 2018 and 2019, Larisa Yurevichene published two editions of The Life of Eldress Matrona Petrovna Mylnikova (Matrona the Barefoot), using archival materials to advocate for her recognition within the church.

In 2022, Natalya Mazalova wrote an article for Vestnik Antropologii examining Matrona's evolving social status and her decision to adopt an unconventional lifestyle shaped by personal loss, widowhood, wartime nursing, and exposure to the hardships of war. Mazalova noted that during the COVID-19 pandemic, the area near Matrona's grave avoided mass infections, which parishioners attributed to her intercession. Another 2021 article by Mazalova in Medical Anthropology and Bioethics explored the psychophysiological aspects of Matrona's healings and their performative nature, highlighting the abundance of recorded miracle stories as unique in parish folklore.

Other works include chapters by Natalya Chernykh in Ascetic Women: Holy Women of Our Time (2019), Archimandrit Feofan in Unblessed Blessed Saints (2017), Anna Pecherskaya in Paths of the Blessed (2010), and Yulia Andreeva in Myths of Ghosts: A Guide to Mystical Petersburg (2020). In 2022, a museum opened in the basement of the Joy of All Who Sorrow Church, featuring exhibits on Matrona, including photographs, graphics, and audio stories of her miracles.

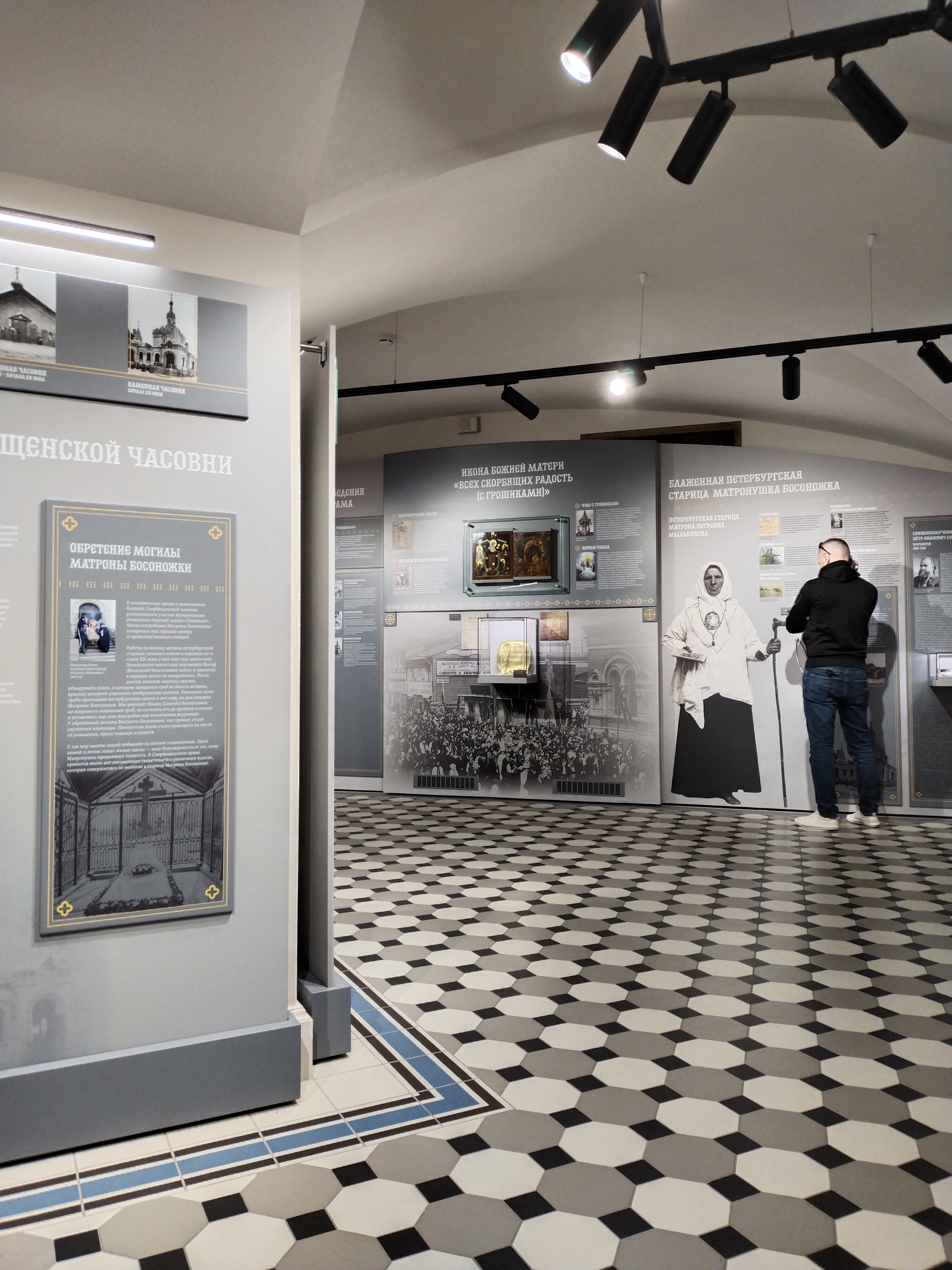
Matrona the Barefoot in the exposition of the temple museum

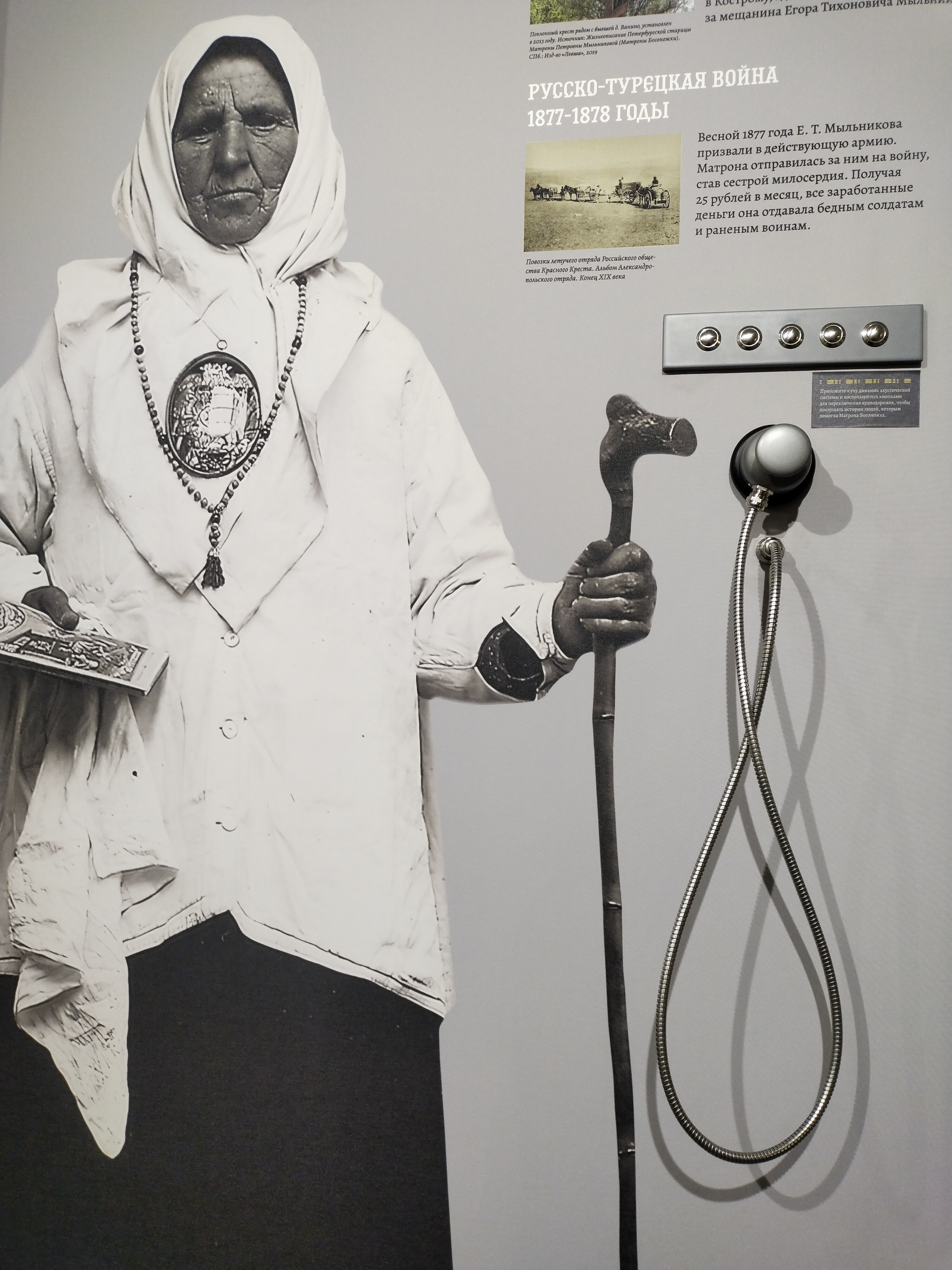
Audio devices with stories about Matrona's miracles

=== Photography and cinema ===
Photographs of Matrona were taken by prominent photographers like Karl Bulla. In 2010, TV-3 aired a 45-minute documentary, Saints: Three Matronas, covering Matrona the Barefoot, Matrona Anemnyasevskaya, and Matrona of Moscow. That year, ABC Studio released a 13-minute documentary, Petersburg Miracle, about the Joy of All Who Sorrow Church, with a segment on Matrona. In 2016, Neva Gate's Guardian a feature-documentary film about Matrona, premiered as part of a series on uncanonized Petersburg ascetics, airing on the Soyuz channel.

=== Poetry and music ===
Wounded soldiers during the Russo-Turkish War often referred to nurses as "saints" or "angels", nicknames later associated with Matrona in a song by the poet Liliya Evseeva entitled White Angel. The lyrics describe her as "For the Russian people - rich and poor, she was a sister of mercy", combining her nursing background with her public persona. In January 2020, iconographer Alexander Bolshakov recounted an experience in which he imagined seeing Matrona dressed in white and praying before she disappeared, leaving barefoot marks in the snow. He noted a similarity to Footprints in the Snow, a poem written earlier by the priest Gennady Belovolov.

== Glorification process ==
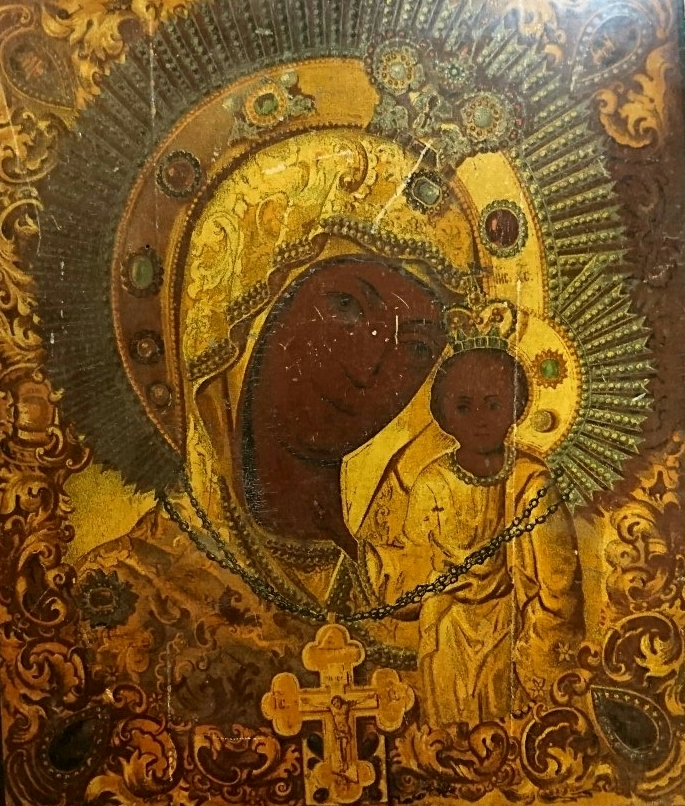
An icon that was presented to Matrona Barefoot in 1903 in Jerusalem by Archimandrite Macarius Migliaras (front)

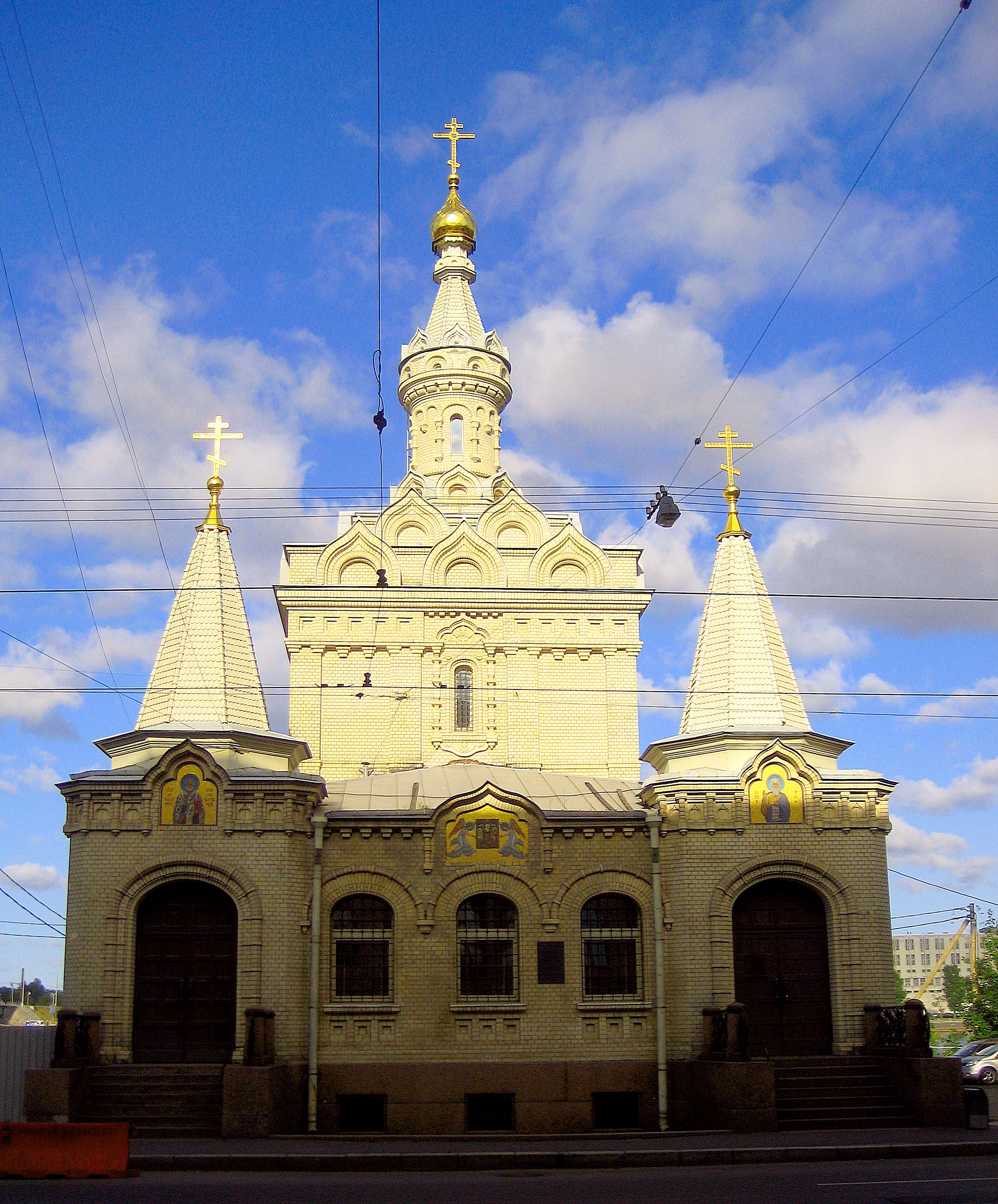
Chapel (now a church) of the icon of the Mother of God Joy of All Who Sorrow, behind which Matrona is buried, 2017

Metropolitan Varsonofy of Saint Petersburg and Ladoga highlighted Matrona's lifestyle of wandering and unconventional behavior, suggesting that stories of unusual events linked to her in recent times support her recognition within the church.

One widely discussed incident attributed to her influence occurred in 1963, when a plane with malfunctioning engines made an emergency landing on the Neva River near her burial site, with no injuries reported among passengers or crew. Some accounts claim that the future Patriarch of Moscow and All Russia, Alexy II, was on board. Local stories associate her with recoveries from conditions such as cancer, alcoholism, drug addiction, infertility, and leg problems, though these remain anecdotal.

Figures like Matrona, characterized by their eccentric lifestyle, are less common among recently recognized religious figures in Russia but continue to attract considerable attention, especially from women. She is often mentioned alongside Matrona of Moscow, Lyubov of Ryazan, and Xenia of Petersburg. Efforts for her canonization began in 1991, but failed due to a lack of reliable data. Evidence of her visits to Jerusalem surfaced in the 1990s through a lithographic icon given to her in 1903. Her grave and white metal coffin with sculpted angels were rediscovered in 1995, left undisturbed under a new tombstone, and became a pilgrimage site.

Since 1995, monks and parishioners have been collecting testimonies of miracles. In 2013, an abbot petitioned for her canonization, but it was postponed due to insufficient documentation. A 2015 expedition searched for documents in her homeland, addressing discrepancies such as her year of birth (variously given as 1814, 1819, or 1833) and unverified claims that she took the Scheme as Mary. A working group formed in 2015 collected archival data and held conferences in 2016 and 2017. By 2019, documents were being prepared for the Synodal Commission on Canonization, with canonization planned to coincide with the restoration of the Church of the Sorrows.

== Bibliography ==
=== Sources ===
- Bazhenov, I. V. (1916). Матрёнушка-босоножка [Matryonushka the Barefoot] (in Russian). Костромские епархиальные ведомости: Журнал. pp. 333–344.
- Metropolitan Barsonophius (2019). Вступительное слово // Жизнеописание старицы Матроны Петровны Мыльниковой (Матроны Босоножки). Изд. 2-е, перераб. и дополн [Introductory word // Life of the old woman Matrona Petrovna Mylnikova (Matrona the Barefoot)] (in Russian). СПб.: Издательство «Левша. Санкт-Петербург». pp. 5–6. ISBN 978-5-9335-6211-5.
- На могилке и в квартире Матрёнушки-босоножки [On Matryonushka's grave and in her apartment] (in Russian). Ведомости Санкт-Петербургского Градоначальства и Столичной полиции: Газета. 1911. p. 2.
- Plotnikov, A. F. (2011). Жизнеописание в Бозе почившей рабы Божией Старицы Матроны Петровны Мыльниковой (Матрёнушки-Босоножки) [Life of the deceased servant of God Matrona Petrovna Mylnikova (Matryonushka Barefoot)] (in Russian). СПб.: Издание Е. В. Киселёвой. p. 95. ISBN 978-5-9056-7601-7.
- Poselyanin, E. N. (2016). Жажда духовная // На молитве. В тишине и в буре [Spiritual thirst // At prayer. In the silence and in the storm] (in Russian). СПб.: Сатисъ. pp. 166–167. ISBN 978-5-7373-0098-2.
- Trufanov, S. M. (2016). Святой чёрт (Записки о Распутине) [Holy devil (Notes on Rasputin)] (in Russian). М.: Directmedia. p. 242. ISBN 978-5-4475-8343-9.

=== Researches and non-fiction ===
- Danilushkina, M. B. (2016). Блаженный Василий Босой / Блаженная Матрёнушка-Босоножка // Блаженные Санкт-Петербурга. От святой блаженной Ксении Петербургской до Любушки Сусанинской [Blessed Basil Barefoot / Blessed Matryonushka Barefoot // Blessed of St. Petersburg. From St. Blessed Xenia of St. Petersburg to Lyubushka Susaninskaya] (in Russian). М.: Воскресенiе. pp. 238–244, 245–268. ISBN 978-5-88335-078-7. Archived from the original on 15 May 2021.
- Devyatova, S. V. (2009). Блаженная Матронушка-босоножка (Петербургская) (1814—1911 гг.) // Православные подвижницы ХХ столетия. 70 жизнеописаний, воспоминания современников, поучения, рассказы о подвигах и чудесах, молитвы [Blessed Matronushka the Barefoot (Petersburg) (1814-1911) // Orthodox ascetics of the twentieth century. 70 biographies, memories of contemporaries, teachings, stories of feats and miracles, prayers] (in Russian). М.: Артос-Медиа. p. 147.
- Yemelyanova, K. S. (2007). Социальные аспекты современных канонизаций Русской православной церкви // Новые церкви, старые верующие — старые церкви, новые верующие. Религия в постсоветской России [Social Aspects of Modern Canonizations of the Russian Orthodox Church // New Churches, Old Believers - Old Churches, New Believers. Religion in post-Soviet Russia] (PDF) (in Russian). М., СПб.: Летний сад. pp. 325–344. ISBN 978-5-9885-6021-0.
- Iroshnikova M. P., Shelaeva Yu. B. (1992). Николай II — последний российский император. Фотолетопись жизни [Nicholas II - the last Russian emperor. Photo chronicle of life] (in Russian). СПб.: Духовное просвещение. p. 509. ISBN 5-85395-019-3.
- Kravtsova, Е. V. (2011). Часть 2. Петербургская старица Матрона Петровна Мыльникова (схимонахиня Мария) // Петербургская старица Матрёнушка-Босоножка [Part 2. St. Petersburg old woman Matrona Petrovna Mylnikova (scheimonakhinia Maria) // St. Petersburg old woman Matryonushka-Bosonozhka] (in Russian). СПб.: Свято-Троицкий Зеленецкий мужской монастырь. pp. 47–95. ISBN 978-5-9056-7601-7.
- Mazalova, N. E. (2022). "Становление и деятельность петербургской целительницы и прорицательницы юродивой Матроны Босоножки" [Formation and activity of the St. Petersburg healer and soothsayer Matrona the Barefoot]. Вестник Антропологии (Herald of Anthropology) (in Russian) (2022 № 1). Вестник антропологии: Журнал: 193–207. doi:10.33876/2311-0546/2022-1/193-207. ISSN 2311-0546.
- Mazalova, N. E. (2021). Целительские аспекты культа блаженной Матроны Босоножки в петербургской прихрамовой среде [Healing aspects of the cult of Blessed Matrona the Barefoot in the St. Petersburg temple environment] (in Russian). Медицинская антропология и биоэтика: Журнал. pp. 193–207. ISSN 2224-9680.
- Mauyerere, U. (2016). К возрождению Православия в России: Автор и читатель современных русских житий святых (1988—2015) [Toward the Revival of Orthodoxy in Russia: Author and Reader of Contemporary Russian Lives of the Saints (1988-2015)] (PDF) (in Russian). Регенсбург: Издательство университета Регенсбурга. pp. 77–95.
- Panin, A. N. (2014a). Странник Василий Босоногий [Wanderer Vasily the Barefoot] (in Russian). Нижний Новгород: Издательский отдел Нижегородской епархии. p. 208. ISBN 978-5-9036-5756-8.
- Panin, A. N. (2014b). Странник Василий Босоногий [Wanderer Vasily the Barefoot] (in Russian). Нижний Новгород: Нижегородская старина: Журнал. pp. 119–146. ISBN 978-5-9036-5756-8.
- Petrov, N. I. (2019). Жизнеописание православного подвижника: между биографией и агиографией // Жизнеописание старицы Матроны Петровны Мыльниковой (Матроны Босоножки) [Life of an Orthodox ascetic: between biography and hagiography // Life of the old woman Matrona Petrovna Mylnikova (Matrona the Barefoot)] (in Russian). СПб.: Издательство «Левша. Санкт-Петербург». pp. 7–9. ISBN 978-5-9335-6211-5.
- Platonov, O. A. (2010). Матрёнушка-босоножка (Матрёна Петровна Мыльникова) // Русские святые и подвижники Православия. Историческая энциклопедия [Matryonushka-barefoot (Matryona Petrovna Mylnikova) // Russian saints and ascetics of Orthodoxy. Historical Encyclopedia]. Исследования русской цивилизации (in Russian). М.: Институт русской цивилизации. p. 515. ISBN 978-5-9027-2563-3.
- Polevoy, B. (2015). Юродивая Матрона Мыльникова (Матрона Босоножка). Путь в XXI век // XV Свято-Троицкие ежегодные международные академические чтения в Санкт-Петербурге 27—30 мая 2015 г. [Yurodiva Matrona Mylnikova (Matrona Barefoot). Path to the 21st century // XV Holy Trinity Annual International Academic Readings in St. Petersburg, May 27–30, 2015] (PDF) (in Russian). СПб.: Издательство Русской христианской гуманитарной академии. p. 147. ISBN 978-5-88812-711-7.
- Smith, D. (2019). Распутин. Вера, власть и закат Романовых [Rasputin. Faith, power and the decline of the Romanovs]. Путешественники во времени (in Russian). М.: Эксмо-Пресс. p. 768. ISBN 978-5-0408-8804-7.
- Yurevichiene, L. A. (2019). Жизнеописание старицы Матроны Петровны Мыльниковой (Матроны Босоножки) [Biography of the old woman Matrona Petrovna Mylnikova (Matrona the Barefoot)] (in Russian). СПб.: Издательство «Левша. Санкт-Петербург». p. 224. ISBN 978-5-9335-6211-5.

=== Publishing and fiction ===
- Andreeva, Yu. I. (2020). Блаженная Матрона Босоножка // Мифы о призраках. Путеводитель по мистическому Петербургу [Blessed Matrona Barefoot // Ghost Myths.A Guide to Mystical St. Petersburg]. Петербург: тайны, мифы, легенды (in Russian). СПб.: Стратa. p. 154. ISBN 978-5-9909-9696-0.
- Pecherskaya, A. I. (2010). Пути блаженных. Ксения Петербургская. Матронушка-Босоножка. Мария Гатчинская. Любушка Сусанинская [Paths of the Blessed. Xenia of St. Petersburg. Matronushka Barefoot. Maria of Gatchina. Lubushka of Susanin]. Православная библиотека (in Russian). СПб.: Крылов. p. 218. ISBN 978-5-4226-0134-9.
- Theophan, archimandrite (2017). У высоты Престола. О блаженной Матронушке Босоножке // Неблаженные блаженные святые. Рассказы о необыкновенных подвижниках [At the Height of the Throne. About Blessed Matronushka the Barefoot // Blessed Blessed Saints. Stories about extraordinary ascetics]. Книги о святых и верующих (in Russian). М.: АСТ. pp. 70–71. ISBN 978-5-1709-9451-9.
- Chernykh, N. B. (2019). Блаженная Матронушка-Босоножка (Мария Щербинина) 1814—1911 // Подвижницы. Святые женщины нашего времени [Blessed Matronushka Barefoot (Maria Shcherbinina) 1814-1911 // Podvizhnitsy. Holy women of our time] (in Russian). М.: Эксмо. pp. 17–24. ISBN 978-5-0403-2872-7.
