= Tkachenko =

Tkachenko (Ukrainian: Ткаченко) is a common Ukrainian surname. Tkachenko is the central and eastern Ukrainian version of the western Ukrainian surname Tkachuk, meaning "weaver". Like other Ukrainian names ending in -ko or -chenko, their heritage is rooted in the Polyans tribe that lived near modern-day Kyiv.

It may refer to:

- Darya Tkachenko (born 1983), Ukrainian draughts player
- Elena Tkachenko (born 1983), Belarusian gymnast
- Heorhy Tkachenko (1898–1993), Ukrainian bandurist
- Igor Tkachenko (1964–2009), Russian military pilot
- Ilia Tkachenko (born 1986), Russian ice dancer
- Ivan Tkachenko (disambiguation), multiple individuals
- Leonid Tkachenko (disambiguation), multiple individuals
- Maryna Tkachenko (born 1965), Ukrainian basketball player
- Nadiya Tkachenko (born 1948), Soviet-Ukrainian pentathlete
- Oleksandr or Alexander Tkachenko (disambiguation), multiple persons
- Pavel Tcacenco (died 1926), Romanian communist
- Petro Tkachenko (1878–1919), Ukrainian kobzar
- Sergey Tkachenko (born 1999), Kazakhstani ski jumper
- Serhiy Tkachenko (born 1979), Ukrainian footballer
- Vasily Filippovich Tkachenko, better known as Vasily the Barefoot (1856–1933), Russian wanderer
- Viacheslav Tkachenko (born 1973), Ukrainian figure skater
- Vladimir Tkachenko (born 1957), Soviet basketball player
- Volodymyr Tkachenko (disambiguation), multiple individuals from Ukraine
