= Gornji Tkalec =

- Village
- Location within Croatia
- Coordinates: 45°58′N 16°28′E
- Country: Croatia

Area
  - Total: 4.1 km^{2} (1.6 sq mi)

Population (2021)
  - Total: 125
  - Density: 30/km^{2} (79/sq mi)
- Time zone: UTC+1 (CET)
  - Summer (DST): UTC+2 (CEST)

Gornji Tkalec is a village in Croatia.
