= Péter Takács =

Péter Takács may refer to:

- Péter Takács (footballer) (born 1990), Hungarian footballer
- Péter Takács (fencer, born 1956), Hungarian fencer
- Péter Takács (fencer, born 1973), Hungarian fencer
