= Aleksandr Tkachyov =

Alexander Tkachev may refer to:

- Alexander Tkachov (politician) (born 1960), governor of Krasnodar Krai, Russia
- Aleksandr Tkachyov (gymnast) (born 1957), Soviet/Russian gymnast
- Alexander Tkachev (swimmer) (born 1972), Russian-born Kyrgyz swimmer
