= Vladimir Tkachyov =

Vladimir Tkachyov may refer to:

- Vladimir Tkachyov (ice hockey, born 1993) (also known as Vladimir A. Tkachyov)
- Vladimir Tkachev (ice hockey, born 1995) (also known as Vladimir E. Tkachyov)
