= Roman Tkachuk (footballer) =

Russian footballer

Personal information
- Full name: Roman Leonidovich Tkachuk
- Date of birth: 9 January 1987 (age 39)
- Place of birth: Novosibirsk, Russian SFSR
- Height: 1.83 m (6 ft 0 in)
- Positions: Midfielder; defender

Senior career*
Years	Team	Apps	(Gls)
2008	FC Sibir-2 Novosibirsk	18	(0)
2009	FC Sibiryak Bratsk	25	(0)
2010–2013	FC Metallurg-Kuzbass Novokuznetsk	64	(1)
2013–2014	FC Volgar Astrakhan	3	(0)
2015	FC Metallurg Novokuznetsk	8	(0)
2015–2016	FC Baikal Irkutsk	27	(0)
2016–2017	FC Sochi	20	(0)
2017–2018	FC Volga Ulyanovsk	10	(0)
2018	FC Altai VKO	9	(0)
2019	FC Chita	6	(0)
2019–2021	FC Novosibirsk	25	(1)
2021–2022	FC Chita	25	(1)
- * Club domestic league appearances and goals

Roman Leonidovich Tkachuk (Russian: Роман Леонидович Ткачук; born 9 January 1987) is a Russian former professional football player.

== Club career ==
He made his Russian Football National League debut for FC Metallurg-Kuzbass Novokuznetsk on 10 July 2012 in a game against FC Neftekhimik Nizhnekamsk.
