= Tibor Takács =

Tibor Takács may refer to:

- Tibor Takács (canoeist), Hungarian sprint canoeist
- Tibor Takács (director) (born 1954), Hungarian-Canadian director
