= Tamás Takács =

Tamás Takács may refer to:

- Tamás Takács (footballer, born 1979)
- Tamás Takács (footballer, born 1991)
- Tamás Takács (swimmer)
