= Vasily the Barefoot =

Russian wanderer

- Василий Босоногий
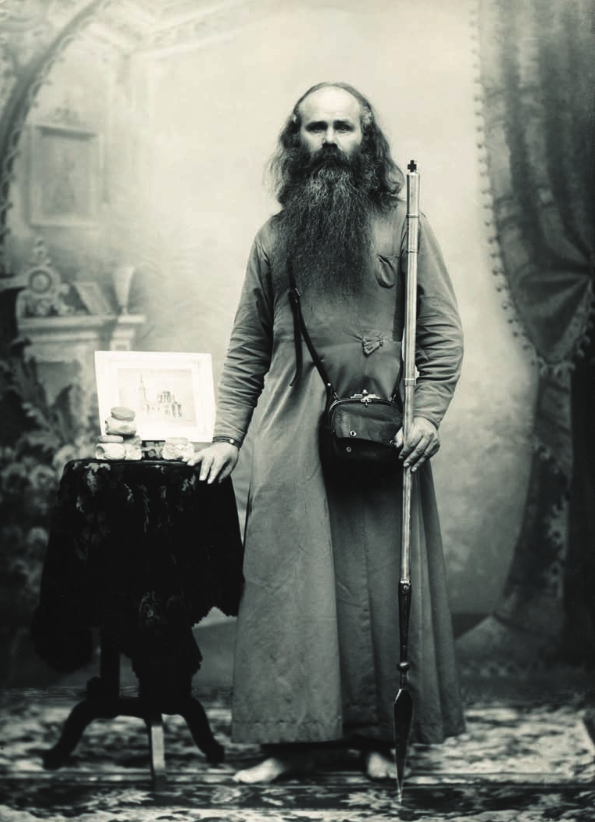
- Vasily with the project of a new temple in the village of Nadezhda as photographed by Karl Bulla, Russian State Film and Photo Archive
- Born: Vasily Filippovich Tkachenko; Between 1856 and 1858; Chernigov Governorate, Russian Empire
- Died: 6 February 1933; Nadezhda, North Caucasus Krai, Soviet Union
- Occupation: Wanderer

Vasily the Barefoot (Russian: Василий Босоногий, real name Vasily Filippovich Tkachenko, Russian: Василий Филиппович Ткаченко; c. 1857 – 6 February 1933) was a Russian wanderer of the late 19th and early 20th centuries. He gained great popularity among his contemporaries through his charitable practice, his campaign against alcoholism and profanity, and the construction of a temple in his native village, for which he raised funds during his travels throughout the Russian Empire. He was introduced to the imperial family and corresponded for many years with representatives of the ruling dynasty about the construction of the temple. His exotic lifestyle and unusual appearance attracted the attention of the creative intelligentsia and secular society.

Sources agree that Vasily Tkachenko was led to the way of wandering by the Archimandrite of the Trinity Monastery of St. Jonas, Jonah of Kiev, canonized by the Russian Orthodox Church. Among Vasily's close friends were the famous adventurer and schemer Hieromonk Iliodor, the revered seer Matrona of Petersburg, and other famous people of his time.

During his lifetime, two booklets devoted to his biography were published. Photographs of the wanderer's appearance were taken by the great photographers of the time, among them Karl Bulla and the staff of the photographic studio K.E. Gan and K, working on the order of the Imperial Family. At the beginning of the 21st century, a book was published and several articles about the life and views of Vasily Barefoot appeared.

== Biography ==
=== Before 1917 ===
Vasiliy Tkachenko was born between 1856 and 1858 in the province of Chernihiv in the family of a wealthy Cossack (though Vasiliy himself pointed out that he belonged to the peasant class, and was named as a peasant in the official reference of the Economic Department of the Most Holy Synod in 1903). It is claimed that he was the youngest of the sons. At the age of 9 he became seriously ill — he had non-healing wounds on his hands and feet (according to another version, ulcers covered his whole body). When he turned 19, his parents made a vow to worship the relics of the saints. The young man was healed, but his parents never fulfilled their promise. Soon after the healing, the family moved to the village of Nadezhda in Stavropol Province. Vasily worked in his native village: he grazed pigs, plowed the land, and got a job at the post station as a coachman. In 1877 he got married. For some unknown reason, Vasily Tkachenko separated from his wife some time later and gave his only six-year-old child to his relatives for raising. His divorce from his wife was finalized only in 1890. After divorcing his wife, Tkachenko began to work as a coachman, driver, and then as a drover for the merchant Masnyankin and went with his herd to Moscow. The famous Stavropol local historian German Belikov claimed that the miraculous recovery from a serious illness affected the psyche of the impressionable young man, so on the road to Moscow he "walked barefoot and almost undressed", "testing and tempering his body and spirit".

From Moscow he came to St. Petersburg, where on June 17 [29] 1884 (Note: In the 19th century, the difference between the Julian and Gregorian calendars was 12 days. In the 20th and 21st centuries, the difference was 13 days.) he was enlisted as a private in the Eger Life Guard Regiment. After only three months, he became seriously ill and by September 21 [3] October 1884, he was in the Semyonovsky Alexander Military Hospital. On October 13 [25] 1884 Tkachenko was declared unfit for military service by the medical commission, and on October 21 he was discharged from the Eger Regiment.

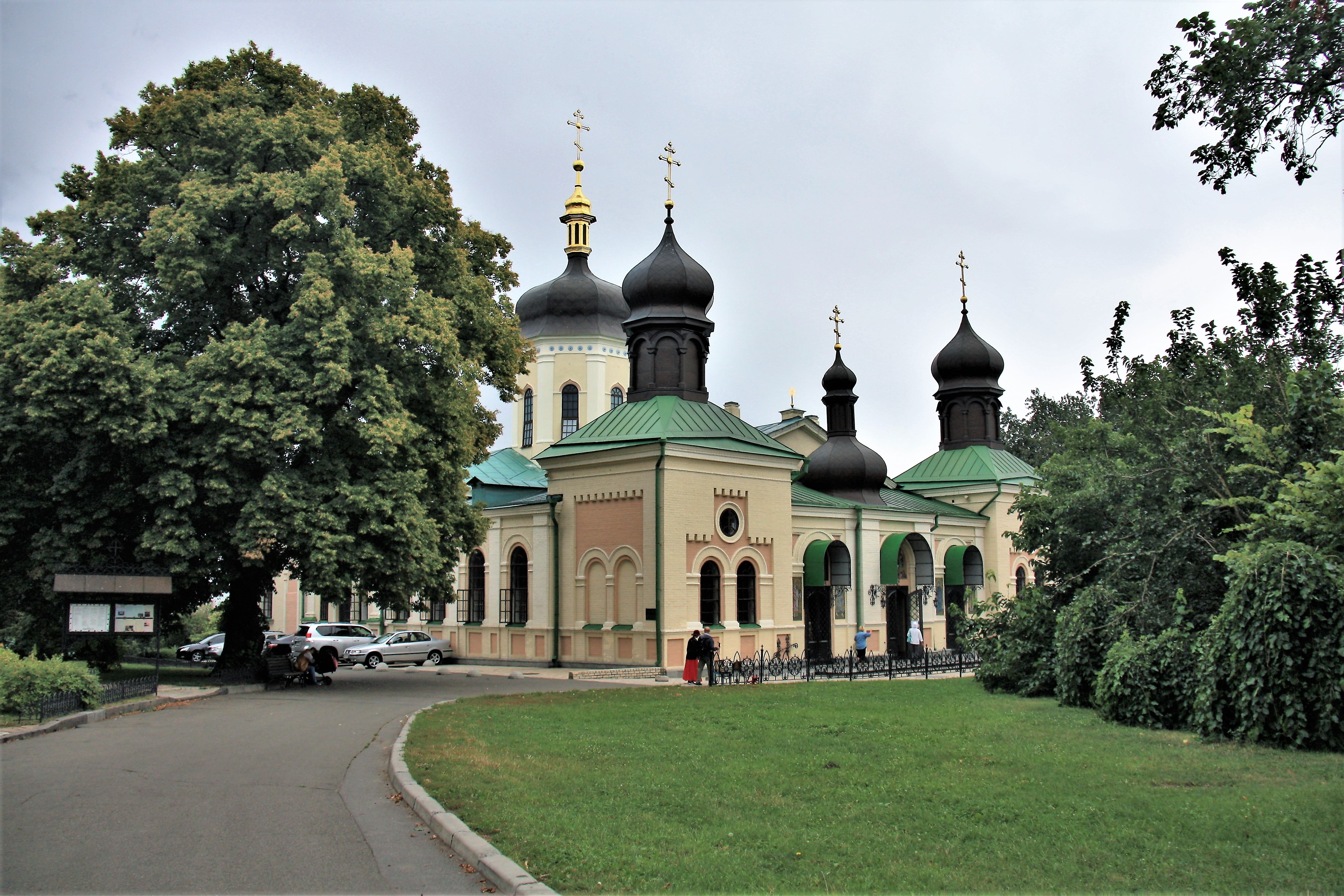
Trinity Church of Holy Trinity Monastery in Kyiv

After being discharged, Tkachenko walked to the Kyiv Pechersk Lavra of the Assumption in search of a new way of life. In Kyiv he met Archimandrite Jonah from Kyiv of the Holy Trinity Monastery, who had strained relations with the monks of the Kyiv Pechersk Lavra. Jonah gave Vasily Tkachenko his blessing to become a wanderer. Tkachenko first wanted to take monasticism, and for some time performed obedience, was a keleinik (assistant to the elderly monks), tailor and coachman at the monastery, but illness and the desire to raise money to build a church in his native village forced him to abandon this plan.

Another version was presented by the modern historian of the Orthodox Church Anatoly Medvedev, based on the life biography of the wanderer, published in 1903 in the Generalov printing house in St. Petersburg: Tkachenko was hired as a drover by the merchant Myasnyankin, but before reaching Moscow he took a settlement and went to Kyiv. After meeting Archimandrite Yonah, Vasily Tkachenko did not take the path of wandering, but joined the Eger regiment of life guards, but due to an impending illness he was first hospitalized and then discharged from the reserve. After his discharge from the army, he "served for some time in private positions" and only then became a wanderer. German Belikov simply mentioned Vasily Tkachenko's short military service without linking it to a specific period of his life.

It is known that for some time Vasily Barefoot's itinerant activities caused concern and misunderstanding among the church authorities. In 1894-1895 he was deported from St. Petersburg for begging, and in the reference of the Holy Synod for 1903 his activities were characterized as resulting from "religious mania". The beggars saw in Vasily a dangerous competitor, tried to drive him from the churches' parvises, and beat him several times. In 1896 the Kyiv police confiscated his staff, which was later returned to him in Peterhof.

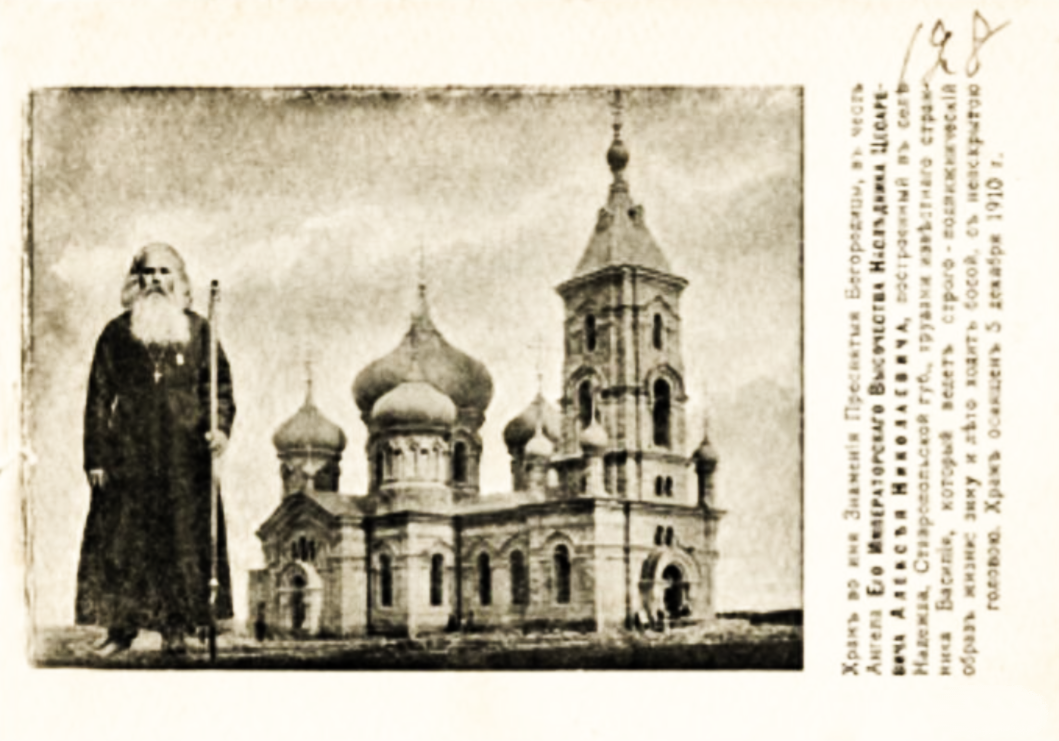
Postcard. Vasily the Barefoot against the background of the Church of the Sign of the Blessed Virgin Mary in the village of Nadezhda, 1911

In 1897, Vasily announced the collection of money for the construction of a new stone church in his native village (initially in honor of the Holy Coronation of the Imperial Majesties, the sign of the Blessed Virgin Mary and tsaritsa Alexandra, German Belikov wrote that Vasily Barefoot was honored with a personal invitation to the coronation). Later it was decided to dedicate the church to St. Nicholas of Myra in honor of the birth of the heir to the throne. During his travels he collected money for the construction. (Note: The Orthodox Church historian Anatoly Medvedev claimed that Basil the Barefoot visited Palestine and prayed at the holy places. The monogramist A.F.K. and the curator of the Archives of the Holy Synod, Marina Danilushkina, mentioned Basil's veneration of the Empty tomb in Jerusalem. Other studies do not contain such a report.) In 1906, the foundation of the future temple was laid, its architectural design was approved, (Note: The design of the temple belonged to the Stavropol architect Vladislav Eduardovich Lobanovsky.) materials for construction were collected, and bells were cast. The construction of the church was completed in 1910. The solemn consecration of the church took place on December 5[18], 1910. The temple was located on a hill in front of the crossroads leading to the city, with five domes and two side chapels: in honor of St. Seraphim of Sarov and St. Alexis of Moscow. It was considered one of the most beautiful in Stavropol. The temple was built of stone, it had a pool for blessings and baptism with a fountain. The square next to the church was made of cast iron slabs. The church could accommodate 1.5 thousand believers at a time. At that time in the village permanently lived only 7,5 thousand souls of both men and women. Also in his village Vasily built a strange lodging house.

The correspondence of Vasily Tkachenko with the representatives of the imperial family concerning the construction of the temple has been preserved. The most frequent addressee of Vasily Tkachenko in this matter was the Empress Dowager Maria Feodorovna, who took an active part in obtaining the necessary permits and documents for the construction; other addressees were the Emperor Nicholas II and Alexandra Feodorovna. Another form of communication were the gifts that Vasily Barefoot sent to St. Petersburg. For the meeting hall of the State Duma on his initiative was written "an icon of the saints of the Russian Church, shining from different ranks and estates" (there is a photo of the icon, made by Karl Bulla). He also ordered and presented to the heir to the throne an icon of Alexius, Metropolitan of Kyiv and All Russia.

In a letter to Nicholas II about the construction of the temple Vasily gave his address — St. Petersburg, 8 company Izmailovsky regiment, house 6, apartment 1, but the monogrammist A. F. K. in the biography of Vasily reported that during his stay in this city the wanderer most often stayed in the suburbs of Kyiv and New Athos. In the capital Vasily the Barefoot, together with Matrona the Barefoot, participated in the collection of money for the construction of the church revered as the miracle-making icon of Joy of All Who Sorrow with copper coins (the icon was destroyed in Soviet times).

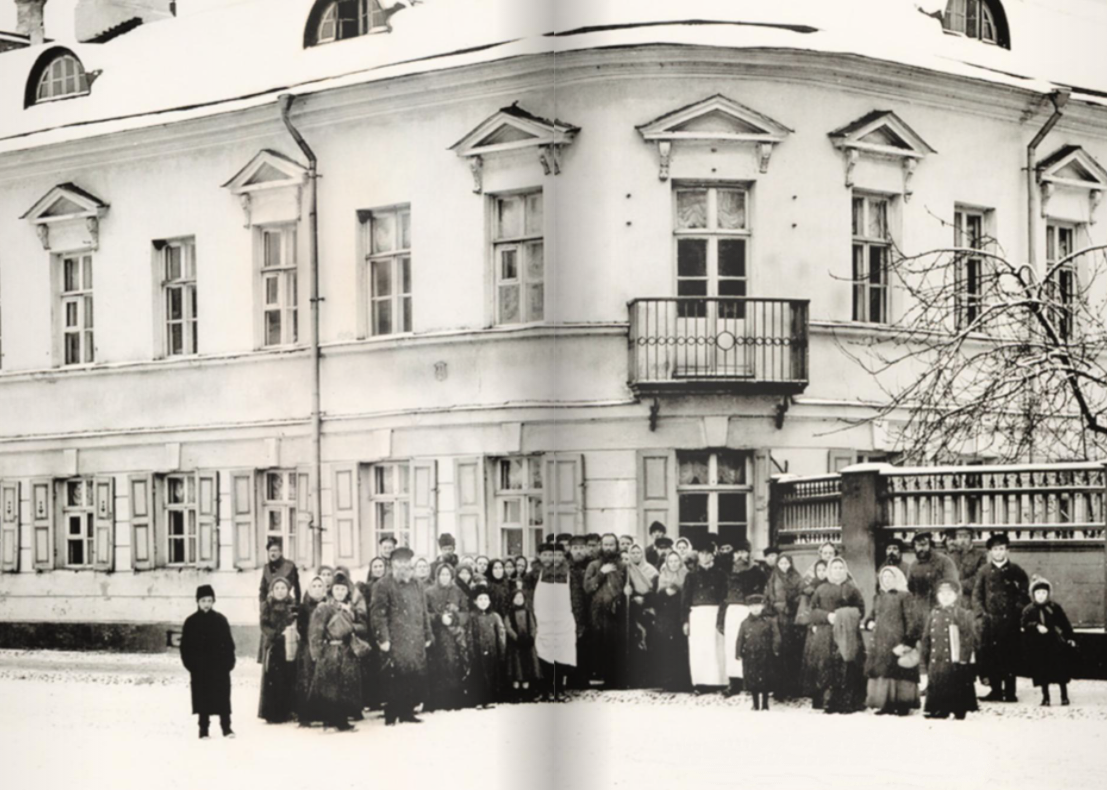
Unknown photographer. Wanderer Vasily the Barefoot near the house of St. John of Kronstadt

Sergey Zhitenev, a candidate of cultural studies, defined wandering as a vow of a person who leaves his family and property and tries to achieve salvation of the soul through suffering in wandering and worship of shrines. Alexander Panin, deputy chairman of the Moscow regional branch of the Imperial Orthodox Palestine Society, chairman of the board of the Fund Revival of Cultural Heritage, member of the Union of Local Historians of Russia, wrote that "the wanderer was perceived as a kind of connection between the people and its vast expanses, where lived, ascended, preached and stayed with their holy relics the greatest benefactors and saints". The monogrammist A. F. K. wrote that Vasily the Barefoot stood out among the Russian wanderers of the turn of the century, "impressing with his moral strength everyone who met him even once".

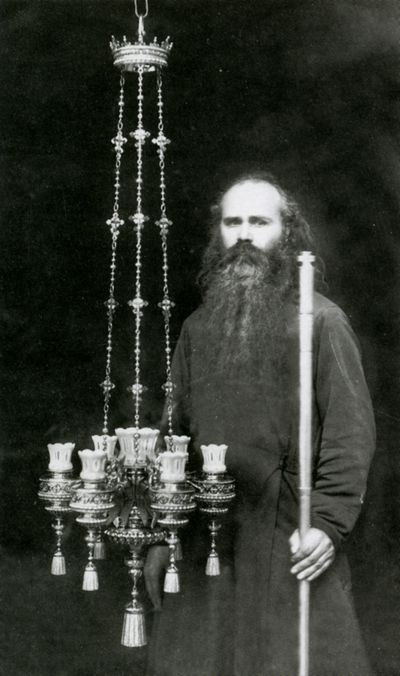
Unknown photographer. Wanderer Vasily the Barefoot with his lamp during the canonization of St. Seraphim of Sarov in the Sarov Desert, 1903.

During his wanderings, Vasily prayed for the faithful, distributed the lives of the saints, books and pamphlets with saints' hagiographies, urged them to give up drinking and profanity, to turn their thoughts to God. In the fourth year of his wanderings, Vasily severely froze his feet, was hospitalized, and even baptized in anticipation of his imminent death. In 1903, Vasily participated in the glorification of St. Seraphim of Sarov in the Sarov desert. As a testimony to his high authority, he was "honored to greet and kiss the hands of the Sovereign Empress, the wife and mother of the Sovereign Martyr Nicholas Alexandrovich". Vasily arrived in Sarov by the court coach. When the tsar's cortege entered the city, he rode in a carriage with one of the tsar's servants. On the way back, he rode in the chamberlain's carriage. As a gift to the monastery, Vasily donated a silver gilded lamp, made according to an original drawing, worth 1,200 rubles.

In 1913, Tkachenko was present in Moscow at the celebration of the glorification of Patriarch of Moscow and all Rus'. Vasily the Barefoot was personally acquainted with John of Kronstadt and the Matrona of Petersburg. In 1911, he attended her funeral and was one of the founders and leaders of the Society for the Memory of the Blessed Old Woman Matrona the Barefoot.

In Soviet historiography the opinion was expressed that after the murder of Grigory Rasputin, Vasily Barefoot was especially sought after by the secular society. In particular, this was written by the Doctor of Historical Sciences Valentin Diakin in the book The Bourgeoisie and Tsarism in the Years of the February Revolution. He dated his appearance after a break in the Petrograd salons to December 20, 1916 [2] January 1917 and referred to information from the Black Hundred newspaper Russkaya Volya.

=== After the February Revolution of 1917 ===
In March 1917, the newspaper Petrogradsky Listok informed its readers that on March 16, the staff of Vasya the Barefoot, which the newspaper called as a full, was handed over to the Extraordinary Investigative Commission "under the State Duma". (Note: Candidate of history Andrei Tereshchuk noted the existence of several types of ambiguous religiosity in the public consciousness of the early 20th century: starets (monks marked by grace, able to warn potential sinners against sinful thoughts), "God's people" (lay ascetics who play the role of intermediaries between God and people as prophets), fools (willingly refuse material goods and do not observe generally accepted rules of behavior), wanderers (characterized by physical and mental restlessness associated with an understanding of the imperfection of the world, which distinguishes them from pilgrims — tourists who travel to holy places)....At the same time, there were no clear boundaries between them.) It was reported that the iron staff weighed about a pood. There was an inscription engraved on it. The Investigative Commission decided to take the staff away so that Vasya the Barefoot "could not use it for the purposes of agitation among the dark masses". The little note in the newspaper made a great impression on the comrade chairman of the St. Petersburg Religious-Philosophical Society, Sergei Kablukov, who carefully cut out the note and pasted it into his diary. (Note: Even later this note was mentioned by Alexander Solzhenitsyn. He saw fit to include it in the text of the book Knot III: March of the Seventeenth of the epic novel the Red Wheel.)

Vasily Tkachenko was last seen in Petrograd in 1918. It is known that he was arrested for some time for wearing a badge of the Union of the Russian People on his chest, which he did not remove even after the victory of the Revolution. Another version of his arrest was recounted by the writer and memoirist Alexei Demidov in his memoirs about Maxim Gorky:

Gorky was sitting next to me, so I asked him:

- Why was Vasya Barefoot arrested? I saw him in the Tauride Palace, behind a hedge of soldiers, among various people, such a moving image. All the detainees were lying on the ground, and Vasya, barefoot, with a long, broad gray beard, was standing in the middle of them, holding a staff with a silver cross on it. Just like Peter among the early Christians. What was that for?

Breakfast was over, we got up from the table.

- Let's go to my office, you'll see.

Alexei Maximovich took a photo card from under the paper and showed it to me.

On the postcard was photographed disorderly company of gypsies with Lokhtina at the head, where were drunk Grigori Rasputin and Vasya the Barefoot, with the same stick — with a silver cross on it.

Once again Alexei Demidov returned to the personality of Vasily Tkachenko in his novel "Whirlwind (1917)", first published in 1926 and subsequently reprinted four times. The wanderer was again portrayed by the writer under arrest. He stands in the middle of a chain of arrested people, barefoot, without a hat and in a cassock. In his hand, Vasily holds his iron cane and, as if paralyzed, looks silently at the people swarming around him.

Documentary evidence about Vasily Barefoot was cut off in 1917. After that only oral and written reports in the memoirs of his contemporaries, written many years later, have survived. According to one of them, Vasiliy Tkachenko died of old age while working as a guard in the storehouse where the church built with his money was turned into. According to another, he died of starvation. One of his relatives (who was still a child in the early 1930s), said:

The temple, built with the help of the wanderer Vasily, was already completely looted and ruined. Grandpa Vassily came to our house. He washed himself, put on clean clothes and in the evening went to the Znamensky temple to pray. I remember him very well that day, although I was only six years old. He was cheerful and radiant. And in the morning the nuns who lived in our village came running to us and told us that they had found Grandpa Vasily in the church, on his knees and already lifeless.

The surviving death certificate states that he died at his home on February 6, 1933, "of senility". Shortly after his death, the temple was bombed. (Note: The local historian Stepan Pinaev claimed that Vasily "saw with his own eyes" the destruction of the church. Currently, the Znamensky Church is being rebuilt in Nadezhdino, but already on a different site (where the Nikolskaya Church, also destroyed in Soviet times, stood) and according to a different project.)

Vasily Tkachenko was buried in the local cemetery of the village of Nadezhda. A gravestone with an almost illegible inscription has been preserved.

== Contemporaries about Vasily the Barefoot ==
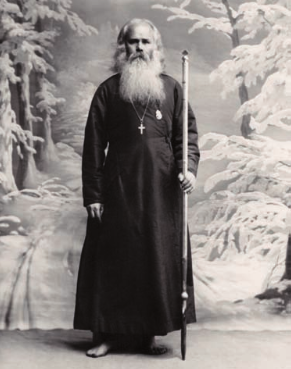
Karl Bulla. Valisy the Barefoot

An employee of the magazine Kronstadt Lighthouse described the appearance of the wanderer as follows "... with silver strands of gray hair waving on his head and a soft beard, which completed the appearance of a biblical man. In his hands, like the staff of Moses, he holds a long, silver-plated iron staff weighing half a pound. Barefoot, he walks silently forward, stopping in the middle of the office, looking at you with his large, gray, penetrating eyes, and exclaims: "Christ is risen". Another contemporary reported that the cross on the pinnacle was gilded.

Vasily usually wore a new blue cassock over his old one, in memory of John of Kronstadt, who loved this color. In the cassock were sewn two huge pockets in the form of sacks, filled with pamphlets and magazines of spiritual content, sheets with portraits and engravings of churches, weighing at least two poods. The newspaper Vecherneye Vremya in 1912 wrote about the wanderer Vasily, contrasting him with Grigory Rasputin in worldview and mental attitude (the favorite of the imperial family was described as a cunning, shrewd man dreaming of a career): "...a simpleton, with the clear inquiries of a guileless soul, a typical wanderer. Those who know the wanderer Vasya close, all say with one voice: God's man. He suffered a lot in his life, endured human malice, injustice. He still bears the traces of legcuffs. He lives like a bird in the sky. He preaches nothing. He has no shelter of his own. Everyone loves him and gives him shelter. He has traveled along and across the whole of Russia". The author of the article wondered why Vasily was so eager to meet Rasputin. The wanderer himself explained this desire by the fact that he knows that Rasputin as an evil and bad man, but was not personally acquainted with him and never "did not talk to him, to be honest".

Russian writer and memoirist Sergei Mintslov wrote in his diary:

May 9th. This morning I was riding in the Shake, an omnibus that runs along Nevsky, and suddenly I saw a stranger, Vasily, get on and stand on the platform; again, of course, he was without a hat and barefoot, in a dark blue robe; everyone looked at him with curiosity. The sparse long hair on his head was wet; in his hand he held his famous staff with a cross at the top and a huge sharp iron spear at the bottom — one of those that are placed on iron fences, only bigger and wider.

The pockets of this holy man were bulging with pamphlets, his own hagiographies; he hands them out to those who want to read them, and if they give him money for them, he immediately drops it into a cup kept behind his sinus. Not long ago he was sued by the world for a scandal and a fight: the usher in the Kazan Cathedral did not let him in with a cane, and he took offense and said: "Emperor Alexander III allowed me to go everywhere with this staff, and you do not let me in?" and grabbed the usher by the collar. A scuffle ensued, and the beaten saint was fined.

The head of the police department in 1912-1914 Stepan Beletsky in the testimony of the Extraordinary Investigative Commission of the Provisional Government attributed Vasily Barefoot to the world of fools ("in the spirit of Mitya Kozelsky"), which Grigory Rasputin revolved around. At the same time, he wrote that Rasputin was afraid of people from his own circle and "jealously guarded his influence on high spheres" from them. Beletsky himself in his memoirs created a vivid image of Vasily ("the elder always stood in a monk's habit, with the badge of the Union of the Russian People, without a hat and with a lamenting staff on the porch of the Kazan cathedral, collecting alms for the construction of the temple, while distributing cards with his picture in full height"), but extremely low assessed the moral qualities of the wanderer and emphasized his closeness to Rasputin. Beletsky reported that he had a long correspondence with the Archbishop of Stavropol, "who exposed his [Tkachenko's] life and self-interest and demanded that his book be taken away for fees, the removal of monastic vestments, and transportation to his homeland. Beletsky claimed that Vasily "enjoyed the patronage of Rasputin. With this Beletsky associated his inviolability, although Tkachenko "was on the books of the police and other obscene acts".

A well-known adventurer and intriguer Sergei Trufanov, then Hieromonk Iliodor (in one of Charles Bulla's photos he is depicted in the company of Vasily the Barefoot at the dinner table), in his memoirs about Rasputin claimed that he could write a whole book about Vasily Tkachenko. During his lifetime, two booklets with the biography of Vasily the Barefoot were published. Both were published in St. Petersburg in 1903, but by different publishers. Modern researchers have noted that the information about the wanderer in these brochures does not always coincide, and sometimes even contradicts itself.

== Vasily the Barefoot in historical researches and culture ==
=== In Soviet fiction and journalism ===
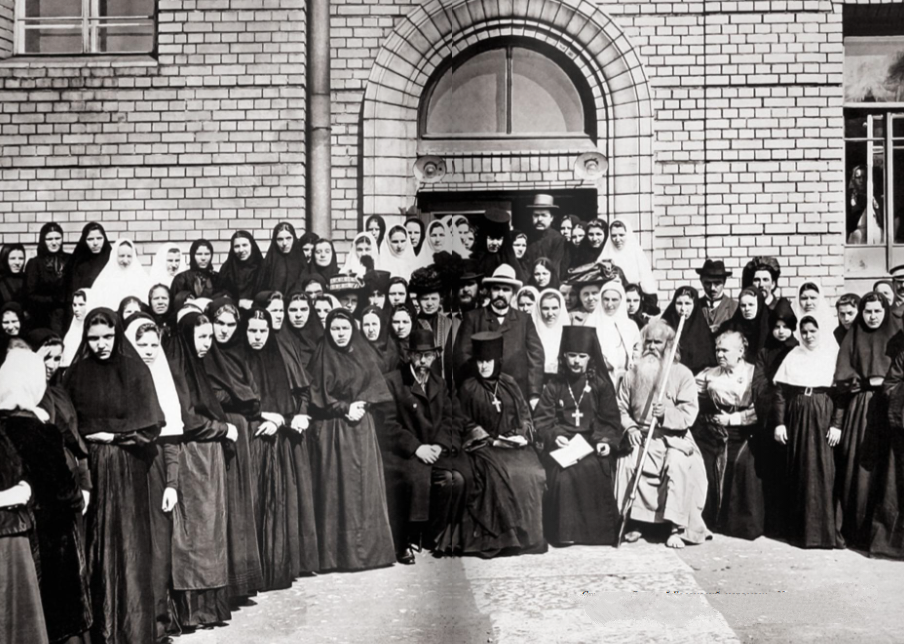
Unknown photographer. Wanderer Vasily the Barefoot, Hieromonk Iliodor with sisters and parishioners of Ioannovsky Convent in St. Petersburg, May 15, 1911.

The memoirist and journalist, former commissar of the Provisional Government, Alexander Voznesensky, believed that Vassily the Barefoot played the same role under the imperial family as Mitya Kozelsky and Grigory Rasputin did after him. He expressed this opinion in his book Moscow in 1917, published in 1928.

Vasily the Barefoot is mentioned in the 9th scene of the 4th act of Mikhail Bulgakov's play Batum. The action is set in Peterhof. The minister tells the tsar about the crime committed by Joseph Dzhugashvili in Tbilisi — he incited the workers to strike. Nicholas II, without listening to the minister's report, tells the story of how a stranger cured the minister of the Imperial Court of the Russian Empire Vladimir Fredericks during his stay at the glorification of St. Seraphim in Sarov. Fredericks began to get cramps in his leg. The doctors could not help him. Vasily ordered "ordinary bottle corks, cut into slices, like sausages, and threaded on a string. And this chain was to be put on his bare leg, after he had smeared saliva under his knee. Vladimir Borisovich walked barefoot for five minutes, and it was all over!"

In later Soviet times, Vasily Barefoot was commonly referred to as one of the "numerous domestic and imported miracle workers, seers, soothsayers, and clichés", which included the occultist Papus, the praying mantis Daria Osipova, the wanderer Anthony, the soothsayer Grippa, the jesters Pasha Diveyevskaya and Mitya Kozelsky. It was believed that they "performed the function of the most trusted persons and advisors of Nicholas II and Alexandra Feodorovna" in the period after the expulsion of the Frenchman Philip and before the appearance of Grigory Rasputin at the court. Doctor of Philosophy Alexander Grigorenko, citing the testimony of Sergei Trufanov, claimed that the tsar had a rule: "First he listens to the 'elders' and the 'blessed', and then to the ministers".

Sergey Bolshakov, a church historian and figure in the ecumenical movement, described his early childhood meeting with Vasily Tkachenko in his book On the Heights of the Spirit many decades later: "It was winter, in January, in a great frost, with the sun shining. I saw a tall, extraordinary figure moving toward us: an old man in a blue cassock, with his head uncovered, gray hair, bearded. In his hands he was holding an ebony staff with a crown on top. What amazed me most was that the old man was walking in the bitter cold, in the snow, barefoot — and his feet were not red, frozen, but pink, as if he were walking on a soft carpet. I was stunned..."

=== In contemporary Russian local lore, journalism and historical science ===
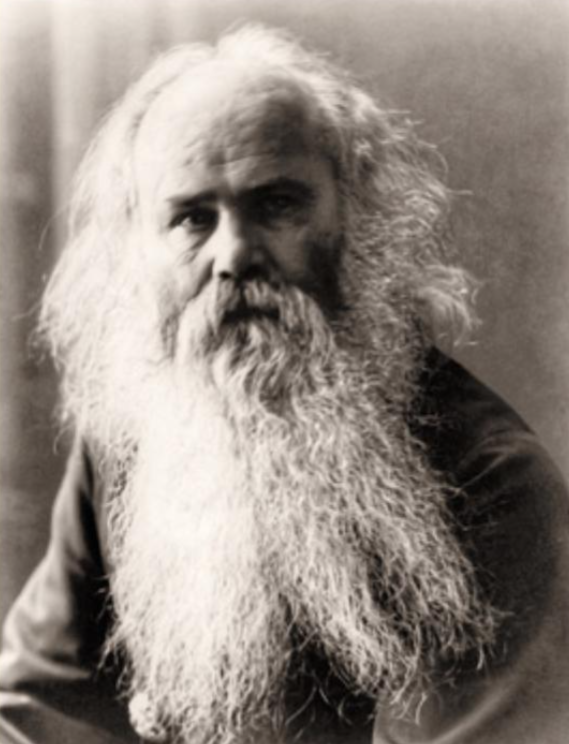
Karl Bulla. Wanderer Vasily the Barefoot.

After a long period of neglect, the St. Petersburg historian of the Orthodox Church Anatoly Medvedev drew serious attention to the personality of Vasily the Barefoot. He published two articles about the wanderer in the publications of the St. Petersburg diocese in 2001 and 2002. In 2011 the famous local historian, candidate of natural sciences, chief researcher of the Stavropol museum of local history named after G. N. Prozritelev and G. K. Prave German Belikov in co-authorship with the doctor of chemical sciences Boris Sinelnikov published the book Temple necklace of the North Caucasian dioceses, in it a separate chapter is devoted to the biography of Vasily the Barefoot and the history of his creation of the temple in the village of Nadezhda.

Already in 2014, Alexei Panin published a long article about Vasily Tkachenko in the magazine Nizhny Novgorodskaya Starina. In the same year, it was published as a book, supplemented and expanded. While working on the biography of his hero, Panin used materials from the State Archive of the Stavropol Territory, the Russian State Military Historical Archive, and the Central Archive of the Nizhny Novgorod Region. Photographs of some of the most important archival documents are placed in the text of the book. It also contains rare photos from the collections of the Central State Archive of Film and Photographic Documents in St. Petersburg and the Russian State Film and Photo Archive in Krasnogorsk, Moscow Region.

In 2016 the biography "Blessed Vasily the Barefoot was included in the collection Blessed of St. Petersburg. From Blessed Xenia of St. Petersburg to Lyubushka Susaninskaya (compiled by Marina Danilushkina, curator of the Archives of the Holy Synod in the RGIA fonds), which collected 24 biographies of the most famous fools of the city for three centuries.

St. Petersburg local historian Andrei Gusarov referred Vasily Barefoot to the fools of the city, but believed that he stood out sharply against their background. The local historian wrote that after the famous events on the staff of the wanderer was inscribed: "This staff was given to the wanderer Vasily by His Imperial Majesty by the decision of Peterhof". He noticed in the behavior of the wanderer a certain ambition and exoticism in dress: "He usually carried small pamphlets with the story of his travels. When Vasily received alms, he hid it behind his back in a special metal cup". Doctor of historical sciences Nikolai Yakovlev believes that in the period of Grigory Rasputin's maximum influence, the role of other "mystical friends" of the Imperial family decreased sharply. The situation changed radically after Rasputin's assassination in December 1916. "In the high society circles of the capital a vacuum formed with the murder of Rasputin, trying to fill — again muttering madly "Vasya the Barefoot", — wrote Yakovlev. The same idea was expressed by the Doctor of Historical Sciences Sergey Firsov, a specialist in the problem of the relationship between the Russian Orthodox Church and state power in the 20th century, in the book "Nicholas II: Prisoner of Autocracy". He argued that after the assassination of Rasputin in December 1916 in the secular society of Petrograd again talked about Mita Kozelsky and Vasya barefoot. The historian commented on this phenomenon as follows: "'The holy place' had never remained empty".

=== In photography and cinematography ===
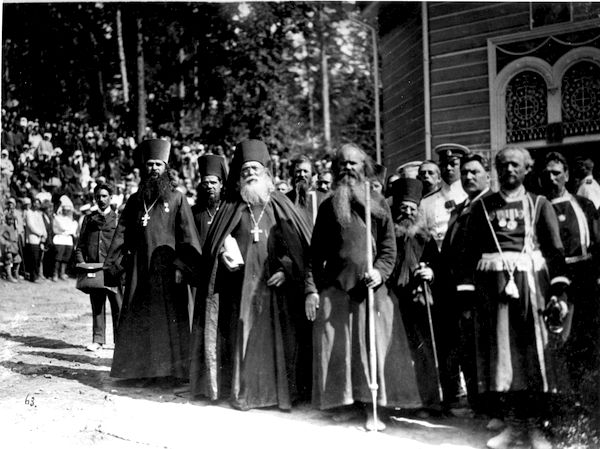
Alexander Yagelsky. Vasily the Barefoot among the clergy of the Sarov Monastery, 17–20 July 1903

There are 21 photographs of Vasily the Barefoot in the collection Image of a God-fearer of the Foundation for the Revival of Cultural Heritage. Among the pictures there are works of great Russian photographers, such as Carl Bulla, who, for example, photographed Vasily the Barefoot at the table where the architectural project of the temple in Nadezhdin was being developed. The photo studio K. E. von Gan and K, working since 1891 by order of the Imperial Family and located in Tsarskoe Selo, Shirokaya Street, in the house of Bernasconi, made the photograph The man of God Vasily Barefoot among the clergy of the Sarov Monastery (July 17–20, 1903). Irina Knyazkova, the chief specialist of the scientific and reference department of the Russian State Archive of Film and Photographic Documents, established that the photographer of the company, who was engaged in photographing and filming the Sarov celebrations, was Alexander Yagelsky.

In 1911, the Universal Postal Union issued a postcard depicting the Church of the Sign of the Blessed Virgin Mary in honor of the Angel of the Heir Tsesarevich Alexei Nikolaevich in the village of Nadezhdino, with Vasily Barefoot standing against the background of the church built with the money he had collected.

In 2018, the short film Vasily the Wanderer was made — a joint project of the puppet theater Dobryi Zhuk, VIA-mult Living Tradition and BUCKSBRIDE studio, dedicated to the fate of Vasily Tkachenko. The script is based on the old Cossack spiritual verse A Sinfull Man. The action of the main part of the movie takes place in 1991, when three boys climb the mountain Budarka (near the lake Vshivoye near the village Demino) to fly a kite. Vasily Tkachenko used to graze cows there in his youth. One of the heroes discovers an unusual find and then sees a dream. From this moment, the animated part of the film begins.

== Bibliography ==
=== First sources ===
- А. F. K. (1903). Странник Василий [A wanderer Vasily] (in Russian). СПб.: Тип. Генералова. p. 13.
- Beletsky, S. P. (1925). Показания // Падение царского режима. Стенографические отчёты допросов и показаний, данных в 1917 г. в Чрезвычайной следственной комиссии Временного правительства. Редакция П. Е. Щёголева [Testimony // The Fall of the Royal Regime. Verbatim reports of interrogations and testimonies given in 1917 in the Extraordinary Investigative Commission of the Provisional Government. Edited by P. E. Shchegolev] (in Russian). Vol. IV. Записки А. Д. Протопопова и С. П. Белецкого. Л.: Государственное издательство. pp. 117–533.
- Beletsky, S. P. (1990). Григорий Распутин // Святой чёрт. Сборник. Автор предисловия и составитель А. В. Кочетова [Grigory Rasputin // Holy Devil] (in Russian). М.: Книжная палата. pp. 10–78. ISBN 5-7000-0235-3
- Voznesensky, А. N. (1928). V. Суды. Следственные комиссии. Митя Козельский — враг Распутина. Чрезвычайная следственная комиссия. Реквизиция особняка Кшесинской в Петрограде и гостиницы «Дрезден» в Москве // Москва в 1917 году [V. Courts. Commissions of inquiry. Mitya Kozelsky - an enemy of Rasputin. Extraordinary Commission of Inquiry. Requisition of the Kshesinskaya mansion in Petrograd and the hotel “Dresden” in Moscow // Moscow in 1917] (in Russian). М., Л.: Государственное издательство. pp. 36–43.
- Bolshakov, S. N. (1971). Старец Василий. Александро-Невская лавра // На высотах духа. Делатели Иисусова молитва [Vasily the Wanderer. Alexander Nevsky Lavra // On the heights of the spirit. Doers of the Jesus Prayer] (PDF) (in Russian). Брюссель: Жизнь с Богом. pp. 19–22.
- Demidov, А. (1928a). Из встреч с М. Горьким [From meetings with M. Gorky] (in Russian). Красная новь: Журнал. — 1928. — Март (№ 3). —. pp. 239–249.
- Dyakin, V. S. (1967). Буржуазия и царизм в годы Февральской революции // Русская буржуазия и царизм в годы Первой мировой войны (1914—1917) [The bourgeoisie and tsarism during the February Revolution] (in Russian). Л.: Ленинградское отделение издательства «Наука». pp. 234–311.
- Minzlov, S. R. (2016). 1904. // Петербург в 1903–1910 годах [1904. // Petersburg in 1903-1910.] (in Russian). М., Берлин: DirectMedia. pp. 64–137. ISBN 978-5-4475-8328-6.
- Посох "Василия-Босоножки" [The staff of Vasily the Barefoot] (in Russian). Петроградский листок: Газета. 17 March 1917.
- Российская империя в фотографиях. Конец XIX — начало XX века. Ред. и сост. Е. Е. Колоскова [The Russian Empire in Photographs: Late 19th — Early 20th Centuries] (in Russian). М.: Лики России. 2004. p. 303. ISBN 978-5-8741-7140-7.
- S. V. T. (1903). Странник Василий [Vasily the Wanderer] (in Russian). Санкт-Петербург: Типолитография Корпуснова.
- Trufanov, S. M. (2016). Святой чёрт (Записки о Распутине) [A holy devil (Notes on Rasputin)] (in Russian). М.: Directmedia. p. 242. ISBN 978-5-4475-8343-9.
- F. M. (16 March 1912). Странник Вася и Распутин [Vasya the Wanderer and Rasputin] (in Russian). Вечернее время: Газета. p. 3.

=== Non-Fiction and researches ===
- Belikov G. A., Sinelnikov B. M. (2011). Церковь во имя Знамения Пресвятой Богоматери // Храмовое ожерелье Северо-Кавказских епархий [Most Holy Mother of God Church // Temple Necklace of the North Caucasian Dioceses] (in Russian). Ставрополь: Северо-Кавказский Государственный Технический Университет — С. 113—115. — 312 с. — 1000 экз. pp. 113–115.
- Grigorenko, A. Yu. (1991). Колдовство и колдуны на Руси // Сатана там правит бал. Критические очерки магии [Sorcery and sorcerers in Russia] (in Russian). Киев: Украина. pp. 116–140. ISBN 5-319-00427-3
- Грустная история последнего странника [The sad story of the last wanderer] (in Russian). Вечерний Ставрополь: Газета. 14 June 2018.
- Gusarov, А. Yu. (2016). Григорий Распутин. Жизнь старца и гибель империи [Grigory Rasputin. The life of the elder and the empire's death] (in Russian). М.: Центрполиграф. p. 320. ISBN 978-5-2270-7259-7.
- Danilushkina, M. B. (2016). Блаженный Василий Босой // Блаженные Санкт-Петербурга. От святой блаженной Ксении Петербургской до Любушки Сусанинской [The Blessed Vasil the Barefoot] (in Russian). М.: Воскресенiе. pp. 238–244. Archived from the original on 2 August 2009. ISBN 5-88335-078-X
- Knyazkova, I. V. (2007). Кинодокументы о Саровских торжествах 1903 года посвященных перенесению мощей Преподобного Серафима Саровского. История поиска и находок (in Russian). Вестник архивиста: Журнал. pp. 66–81.
- Krivolapova, E. M. (2003). Дневник Сергея Платоновича Каблукова. Год 1917. Предисловие, публикация и комментарии Е. М. Криволаповой [Diary of Sergei Platonovich Kablukov. Year 1917. Preface, publication and comments by E. M. Krivolapova. M. Krivolapova] (in Russian). Литературоведческий журнал: Журнал. pp. 138–234.
- Medvedev, А. V. (24 January 2001). Странник Василий Босоногий [Wanderer Vasily the Barefoot] (PDF) (in Russian). Санкт-Петербургские Епархиальные ведомости: Журнал. pp. 57–60.
- Medvedev, А. V. (December 2002). Василий Босоногий [Vasily the Barefoot] (PDF) (in Russian). Ведомости Свято-Троицкого Зеленецкого мужского монастыря: Журнал.
- Panin, А. N. (2014a). Странник Василий Босоногий [The Wanderer Vasily the Barefoot] (in Russian). Нижний Новгород: Издательский отдел Нижегородской епархии. p. 208. ISBN 978-5-9036-5756-8.
- Panin, А. N. (2014b). Странник Василий Босоногий [The wanderer Vasily the Barefoot] (in Russian). Нижегородская старина: Журнал. pp. 119–146.
- Pinayev, S. (2010). Храмы надежды // Ставропольский краевой союз казаков. Ставропольское казачье войско. 1990—2010 / сост. Д. В. Стригунов, П. Д. Деев [The Temples of Hope] (PDF) (in Russian). Ставрополь: Сервисшкола. pp. 165–166.
- Tereschuk, А. V. (2006). "3. «Божий человек»". Григорий Распутин. Последний "старец" империи [Grigory Rasputin. The last “elder” of the empire] (in Russian). СПб.: Вита Нова. pp. 111–168. ISBN 5-9389-8103-4
- Firsov, S. L. (2010). "4. У бездны на краю: Великая война и царь". Николай II: Пленник самодержавия [Nicholas II: Prisoner of autocracy]. Жизнь замечательных людей (in Russian). Vol. 1279. М.: Молодая гвардия. pp. 330–434. ISBN 978-5-2350-3382-5.
- Yakovlev, N. N. (2003). Набат брусиловского прорыва // 1 августа 1914 [Nabat Brusilov breakthrough // August 1, 1914]. Новейшая история (in Russian). М.: Эксмо. pp. 239–322. ISBN 5-6990-1574-4

=== Fiction and journalism ===
- Bulgakov, М. (1992). Батум // Собрание сочинений в 5 томах [Batum] (in Russian). Vol. 3. Plays. М.: Художественная литература. pp. 512–572.
- Demidov, А. (1928b). Вихрь (1917). 2-е изд [Whirlwind (1917)] (in Russian). М., Л.: Государственное издательство. p. 456.
- Solzhenitsyn, А. I. (1991). Красное колесо. Узел III: Март Семнадцатого. 642. По свободным газетам 16—18 марта [The Red Wheel. Node III: March of the Seventeenth. 642. According to the free newspapers of March 16–18] (in Russian). Звезда: Журнал. pp. 25–36.
