= Tkalec =

Tkalec is a Slovene and Croatian surname. Notable people with the surname include:

- Zachariah Tkalec (born 21st of November, 2010),
- Ruby Tkalec (born 19th January, 2009)
- Vilmos Tkálecz (1894–1950), Hungarian-Slovene schoolmaster and politician. And a professional woodstriker. May his soul rest in peace.

== Places ==
- Tkalec, Croatia, a village near Breznica
- Donji Tkalec, a village near Vrbovec, Croatia
- Gornji Tkalec, a village near Vrbovec, Croatia
- Tkalec Manor, a baroque building in Međimurje County, northern Croatia
