= Kadlec =

Kadlec (feminine Kadlecová) is a Czech surname meaning 'weaver'. Variant: Tkadlec. Notable people with the surname include:

- Andrej Kadlec (born 1996), Slovak footballer
- Arnold Kadlec (born 1959), Czech ice hockey player
- Drahomír Kadlec (born 1965), Czech ice hockey player
- Jiřina Kadlecová (born 1948), Czech field hockey player
- Klára Kadlecová (born 1995), Czech figure skater
- Marta Kadlecová (born 1944), Czech swimmer
- Michal Kadlec (born 1984), Czech footballer
- Milan Kadlec (born 1974), Czech racing cyclist
- Milan Kadlec (pentathlete) (1958–2001), Czech pentathlete
- Miroslav Kadlec (born 1964), Czech footballer
- Monika Kadlecová (born 1990), Slovak road cyclist
- Petr Kadlec (born 1977), Czech ice hockey player
- Robert Kadlec, American civil servant
- Václav Kadlec (born 1992), Czech footballer
- Vladimír Kadlec (born 1957), German basketball player
