= Tcaci =

Tcaci is a Romanian-language occupational surname, a Romanoian respelling of the Slavic surname Tkach meaning "weaver". Notable people with the surname include:

- Leonid Tcaci (b. 1970), Moldovan football manager
- Svetlana Șepelev-Tcaci (b. 1969), Moldovan long-distance runner
- Zlata Tcaci (1928–2006), Moldovan composer
