= Tkachuk =

Origin
- Region of origin: Ukraine

Tkachuk, Tkatchuk (Ukrainian: Ткачук) is a common Ukrainian surname in Ukraine and the Ukrainian diaspora. The name in Ukrainian stands for the name of occupation, weaver. The names that end in -chuk or -czuk are of the western Ukrainian origin. Polish-language variant: Tkaczuk. Notable people with the surname include:

== Tkachuk ==
- Anastasiya Tkachuk (born 1993), Ukrainian runner
- Anatoly Tkachuk (1937–2017), Ukrainian rower
- Andriy Tkachuk (born 1987), Ukrainian footballer
- Bordan Tkachuk (born 1954), British business executive
- Brady Tkachuk (born 1999), American ice hockey player
- David Tkachuk (born 1945), Canadian Senator
- Denis Tkachuk (born 1989), Russian footballer
- Evgeniy Tkachuk (aka Yevgeny Tkachuk; born c.1984), Russian actor and singer
- Grant Tkachuk (born 1968), Canadian professional ice hockey player
- Keith Tkachuk (born 1972), American professional ice hockey player
- Kevin Tkachuk (born 1976), Canadian rugby player
- Maryna Tkachuk (born 1964), Ukrainian historian and academic
- Matthew Tkachuk (born 1997), American ice hockey player
- Oleksandr Tkachuk (born 1985), Ukrainian footballer
- Roman Tkachuk, Soviet actor
- Roman Tkachuk (footballer) (born 1987), Russian footballer
- Serhiy Tkachuk, (born 1992), Ukrainian-born Kazakhstani footballer
- Yevheniy Tkachuk (born 1991), Ukrainian footballer
- Yuriy Tkachuk (born 1995), Ukrainian footballer
- Valeri Tkachuk (born 1963), Russian footballer
- Vasyl Tkachuk (1916–1944), 20th century Ukrainian poet and activist
- Viktoriya Tkachuk (born 1994), Ukrainian runner
- Vsevolod Tkachuk (born 1946), Soviet and Russian chemist and academic

== Tkatchuk ==
- Irina Tkatchuk (born 1983), Russian figure skater
