= Council of Ministers of Russia =

Executive council

The Russian Council of Ministers is an executive governmental council that brings together the principal officers of the Executive Branch of the Russian government. This includes the chairman of the government and ministers of federal government departments.

== Imperial Russia ==
=== Committee of Ministers ===
The Ministries and the Committee of Ministers (Комитет Министров) were created in the early 19th century as part of the Government reform of Alexander I. The committee was an advisory board for the Emperor but could only consider matters referred to it by the monarch or when details for implementation of policy were brought to it by ministers. However, the committee had little collective power and did not make decisions, just recommendations. When the monarch presided personally over Committee meetings it was referred to as a council as the monarch had decision/policy making authority that the committee did not possess.

==== Chairmen of the committee of Ministers (de facto), 1802 – 1810 ====
- Alexander Romanovich Vorontsov (1802–1804) as Imperial Chancellor and Foreign Minister
- Adam Jerzy Czartoryski (1804–1806) as Foreign Minister
- Andreas Eberhard von Budberg (1806–1807) as Foreign Minister
- Nikolay Petrovich Rumyantsev (1807–1810) as Foreign Minister

==== Chairmen of the committee of Ministers, 1810 – 1905 ====
- Nikolay Petrovich Rumyantsev (1810–1812)
- Nikolay Ivanovich Saltykov (1812–1816)
- Pyotr Vasilyevich Lopukhin (1816–1827)
- Viktor Pavlovich Kochubey (1827–1834)
- Nikolay Nikolayevich Novosiltsev (1834–1838)
- Illarion Illarionovich Vasilchikov (1838–1847)
- Vasily Vasilyevich Levashov (1847–1848)
- Aleksandr Ivanovich Chernyshov (1848–1856)
- Aleksey Fyodorovich Orlov (1856–1861)
- Dmitry Nikolayevich Bludov (1861–1864)
- Pavel Pavlovich Gagarin (1865–1872)
- Nikolay Pavlovich Ignatyev (1872–1879)
- Pyotr Aleksandrovich Valuyev (1879–1881)
- Michael von Reutern (1881–1887)
- Nikolai Karl Paul von Bunge (1887–1895)
- Ivan Nikolayevich Durnovo (1895–1903)
- Sergei Yulyevich Witte (1903–1905)

=== Council of Ministers ===
After Nicholas II issued the October Manifesto of 1905 granting civil liberties and a national legislature (Duma and a reformed State Council), the committee was replaced with a Council of Ministers. Unlike the Committee of Ministers, this council was presided over by a Chairman (Совет министров) besides the Emperor, and functioned as a policy making cabinet with its Chairman acting as Prime Minister (head) of the government. As a result, from 1905 to 1917 the Council of Ministers collectively decided the government's policy, tactical direction, and served as a buffer between the Emperor and the national legislature.

The meetings of the council were in two parts, "official and secret". The first followed a printed agenda; the second was devoted to the discussion of confidential questions, basic issues of policy and so forth.

- Sergei Yulyevich Witte (1905–1906)
- Ivan Logginovich Goremykin (1906)
- Pyotr Arkadyevich Stolypin (1906–1911)
- Vladimir Nikolayevich Kokovtsov (1911–1914)
- Ivan Logginovich Goremykin (1914–1916)
- Boris Vladimirovich Shtyurmer (1916)
- Alexander Fyodorovich Trepov (1916)
- Nikolai Dmitriyevich Golitsyn (1916–1917)

Nicholas's hostility to parliamentarism emerged at the very beginning of his reign in 1894; to him, it would cause Russia to disintegrate. According to S. Kulikov: "Nicholas was pursuing the entirely specific idea of gradually replacing absolutism with dualism, rather than with parliamentarism". On 1 July 1914, the Tsar suggested that the Duma – half of the deputies were nobles – should be reduced to merely a consultative body. On 24 August 1915 the Progressive Bloc, including the entire membership of the Duma, except the extreme right and the extreme left, was formed. It had the support of the press, the public opinion and, to a considerable extent, most of the Council of Ministers as well. The deputies tried to bring the Council "uninterested in reform" under control of the Duma, but their demands for a "ministry of confidence" were not received by the Tsar.

In late 1915, there was a shortage of food and of coal in the big cities; Alexander Trepov was appointed as crisis manager in the Minister of Railways. Five key ministries would gather on a more regular basis to solve the transport question. In November 1915 Rasputin told Goremykin (or the obstinate Tsar) it was not right not to convene the Duma as all were trying to cooperate; one must show them a little confidence. In January 1916, Rasputin was opposed to the plan to send the old Goremykin away, who had persuaded the Tsar to reject the proposals of the Progressive Bloc for a government of confidence.

On 20 January 1916 Boris Stürmer was appointed as Prime Minister "to the surprise of everyone, and most of all Goremykin, who, as was usual with the Emperor, had never been given the idea that he was even in danger". According to B. Pares, Stürmer was prepared to pose as a semi-liberal and would try in this way to keep the Duma quiet. The new chairman of the council was not opposed to the convening of the Duma, as Goremykin had been, and he would launch a more liberal and conciliatory politic. The Duma gathered on 9 February, on the condition not to mention Rasputin. The deputies were disappointed when Stürmer made his indistinct speech. For the first time in his life, the Tsar made a visit to the Taurida Palace, suggesting he was willing to work with the legislature. According to Milyukov Stürmer would keep his further dealings with the Duma to a minimum.

Boris Stürmer was also appointed on the Ministry of Interior, the most powerful of all, which had under its control governors, police, and a Special Corps of Gendarmes, the uniformed secret police. He had risen to the status of virtual dictator. In the same month, Minister of War Alexei Polivanov, who in his few months of office had brought about a recovery of the efficiency of the Russian army, was removed and replaced by Dmitry Shuvayev. According to Victor Chernov, the campaign of the party of the Empress and Rasputin was waged steadily against the eight ministers who "had resisted the removal of the commander in chief (Grand Duke Nikolai), and one after the other they were discharged".

Early July, Aleksandr Khvostov, Alexei's uncle, not in good health, was appointed as Minister of the Interior and Makarov as Minister of Justice. Foreign Minister Sazonov, decisive when the war started, pleaded for an independent and autonomous Russian Poland. He was demoted on 10 July and the office given to Stürmer. On 21 July, the minister of agriculture Naumov refused to participate any longer in the government. According to Vladimir Gurko, the Council of Ministers as a whole declined continually in importance.

Around 6 September, Alexander Protopopov had been invited as Minister of the Interior. Placing the vice-president of the Duma in a key post might improve the relations between the Duma and the throne. Protopopov made himself ludicrious when he expressed his loyalty to the Imperial couple, and his contacts on peace and credit in Stockholm (without being authorized) became a scandal. (Note: From 16 April till 20 June Milyukov, Protopopov and a delegation of 16 delegates (6 members of the State Council and the 10 members of the Duma) had visited France, and England. Protopopov stayed behind and traveled to Sweden, where he met the German industrialist and politician Hugo Stinnes, Knut Wallenberg, the Swedish Minister of Foreign Affairs, Hellmuth Lucius von Stoedten, the former German ambassador to Russia, then in Sweden, and Fritz M. Warburg, a banker and member of the Warburg family on 23 June. Protopopov was extremely open about his attempt. According to Chernov: "The Warburg interview opened up a career for Protopopov and made him acceptable as minister. Above all, it won him the favour of Rasputin and the Empress." It seems that Berlin did not take such meetings seriously: seen the identity of the members, and the lack of any clear authority.) When Protopopov raised the question of transferring the food supply from the Ministry of Agriculture to the Ministry of the Interior, a majority of the zemstvo leaders announced that they would not work with his ministry. His food plan was universally condemned by the Council of Ministers.

== Soviet Russia ==
The Sovnarkom of the RSFSR was the basis for all Soviet governments, including both Union and republican levels, until 1946, when all of the Sovnarkoms were renamed "Councils of Ministers". With the leading role of the Communist Party of the Soviet Union (CPSU) fixed by law in the 1936 Soviet Constitution, the governments were little more than the executive bodies of the Central Committee of the CPSU. The CPSU's leading role was also stated in the 1977 Soviet Constitution, and was not abolished until 1990.

== Russian Federation ==
After the fall of the Soviet Union the Russian Council of Ministers became the chief body of administration for the President of the Russian Federation. At times it consisted of as many as 60 ministries and state committees and up to 12 Vice-Premiers. After the 2004 reform, Government duties were split between 17 Ministries, 7 Federal Services and over 30 governmental Agencies.

The Prime Minister is appointed by the President of Russia and confirmed by the State Duma. The chairman is second in line to succeed to the Presidency of Russia if the current President dies, is incapacitated or resigns.

== See also ==
- Premier of the Soviet Union
- Prime Minister of Russia
