= Fall of Eagles =

1974 British television series

- Genre: Drama
- Created by: John Elliot
- Narrated by: Michael Hordern
- Country of origin: United Kingdom
- No. of episodes: 13

Production
- Producer: Stuart Burge
- Running time: 50 to 55 minutes

Original release
- Network: BBC1
- Release: 15 March – 7 June 1974

Fall of Eagles is a thirteen-part British television drama aired by the BBC in 1974. The series was created by John Elliot and produced by Stuart Burge. The series portrays historical events from 1848 to 1918, focusing on three ruling dynasties: the Habsburgs of Austria-Hungary, the Hohenzollerns of Germany and the Romanovs of Russia. The scriptwriters were Keith Dewhurst, John Elliot, Trevor Griffiths, Elizabeth Holford, Ken Hughes, Troy Kennedy Martin, Robert Muller, Jack Pulman, David Turner and Hugh Whitemore.

== Overview ==
The series tells the story of the final decades of three great empires brought to downfall by historical events. Each empire used an eagle in its heraldry. The central theme is the effects of centuries of despotism, with a lack of social reform and the devastating effects of World War I, that caused revolutionary movements to form. It begins in the aftermath of the Revolutions of 1848 and continues through the Armistice of 11 November 1918, covering about 70 years of history in 13 episodes. The episodes' vignettes move between the three empires: Austria-Hungary, Germany, and Russia.

== Episodes ==
No.	Title	Time period
1	"Death Waltz"	1853–1860
Franz Josef has been Austrian emperor since 1848, yet he remains unmarried five years into his reign. His mother, Archduchess Sophie, is determined to ensure the Habsburg line and favours her niece Helene as the future empress. However, Franz has other ideas and prefers Helene's 15-year-old sister Elisabeth, whom he marries. She struggles to deal with her new position as Empress of Austria, motherhood and her domineering mother-in-law. Endeavouring to carve some of her own space, she resumes a friendship with her old Hungarian mentor Count Majlath. Her fixation with his country is unwelcome at the Austrian court.
2	"The English Princess"	1858–1871
In the hope of promoting a liberal and united Germany, Queen Victoria of the United Kingdom and Prince Albert arrange for their eldest daughter Victoria ("Vicky") to marry Prince Frederick ("Fritz"), son of Wilhelm I, King of Prussia. However, despite her love for Fritz and their growing family, the English princess is unprepared for the constraints of her new life in Berlin. Her politically liberal views and her influence over her husband clash with those of Otto von Bismarck and the Prussian doctrine of blood and iron. Bismarck wins influence over the King and surprises Europe with swift victories during the decisive Austro-Prussian War and Franco-Prussian War.
3	"The Honest Broker"	1887–1890
With Germany united under Prussia, Bismarck seeks a stabilising alliance with the Austrians and Russians through the League of the Three Emperors. His plans extend to influencing the Kaiser's grandson Wilhelm. In 1888, Wilhelm I and his successor Frederick III both die (the Year of the Three Emperors). Kaiser Wilhelm II rapidly assumes the throne; Bismarck is forced to resign when his policies and political style clash with those of the young emperor. The ageing chancellor seeks support from Vicky, but she spurns him and blames his meddling for her estrangement from her son.
4	"Requiem for a Crown Prince"	1889
On 30 January 1889, tragedy strikes the House of Habsburg when liberal Crown Prince Rudolf of Austria-Hungary and his young mistress Baroness Mary Vetsera are found dead at the hunting lodge at Mayerling in the Vienna Woods, 24 km southwest of the capital, in an apparent murder-suicide by Rudolf. In Vienna, and at Mayerling, imperial officials contrive to hide the events of the Mayerling incident to prevent a massive public scandal, misleading the emperor and the empress about the true nature of the deaths. Rudolf's letters and the report by Professor Widerhofer finally reveal the truth to the royal couple. The episode, narrated in hindsight, ends with news of the assassination of the Empress in Geneva in 1898.
5	"The Last Tsar"	1894
Tsar Alexander III doubts the ability of his son and heir-apparent, Nicholas, to one day rule the Russian Empire. The young tsarevich is similarly apprehensive. Despite his longstanding affair with Petersburgian ballerina Mathilde Kschessinska and the disapproval of his mother over his marriage choice, he is resolved to marry Princess Alix of Hesse-Darmstadt, seemingly the suitable match. Travelling to Germany, Nicholas II is supported in this by his relatives, including his cousin Kaiser Wilhelm and Alix's grandmother, the ageing Queen Victoria of the United Kingdom. Meanwhile, the autocratic conservatism of the Imperial Government has resulted in discontent among factory workers, under the aegis of the revolutionary Vladimir Lenin.
6	"Absolute Beginners"	1903
Nicholas II has now been tsar for nine years and refuses to share his absolute authority with a parliament urged by social reformers. Now married and in London, Lenin is founding his own more radical brand of Marxism and manoeuvres to divide the Russian Social Democratic Labour Party and its publication Iskra from his primary rival Julius Martov. He befriends Leon Trotsky, and despite ill health, at the Second RSDLP Congress, Lenin moves to consolidate control. One by one, moderates and liberals are side-lined or expelled, leaving the party split into Bolsheviks and Mensheviks. Meeting at the grave of Karl Marx, many former comrades bid him farewell.
7	"Dearest Nicky"	1904–1905
Nicholas II is preoccupied by strikes and the humiliating war with Japan; the continual unsolicited advice and gifts of his cousin, Wilhelm II; and the health of his only son Alexei, who is haemophilic. A rising tide of discontent among St. Petersburg's working class leads to the assassination of the interior minister Vyacheslav von Plehve. Police attack a demonstration led by police spy and priest Fr. Georgy Gapon, killing many. Nicholas believes that his people are still loyal and resists change. Wilhelm attempts to forge an alliance with Russia. Nicholas, considering Germany's assistance, is willing to sign, but his ministers insist that they must first show it to France for consideration.
8	"The Appointment"	1905
When Grand Duke Sergei is murdered, Nicholas II dismisses his police chief and considers Pyotr Rachkovsky as a suitable replacement, even though he seems untrustworthy and is rumoured to use agents provocateur. Both Sergei Witte and Empress Alexandra also have grave concerns about him and his methods, but for different reasons. Nevertheless, with unrest fomenting and the memory of Bloody Sunday still fresh, he is appointed after seeking additional authority from the Tsar. Nicholas grants some concessions, including the creation of the Duma, as Rachkovsky begins using his forces in a deadly purge of troublemakers and revolutionaries in St. Petersburg and beyond.
9	"Dress Rehearsal"	1908–1909
Britain's King Edward VII makes a visit to the Royal Russian yacht to discuss an alliance with Russia. Meanwhile, Russia's foreign minister, Alexander Izvolsky, begins intriguing to have the Bosphorus opened to the Black Sea Fleet, preferring access to the Dardanelles over guaranteeing Serbian sovereignty against Austria in the Balkans. He quickly finds himself outplayed by Alois Lexa von Aehrenthal when Austria rapidly annexes the Turkish territory of Bosnia and Herzegovina, precipitating the Bosnian Crisis. In its wake, and with the sting of the loss to Japan still fresh, Russia is again outwitted and embarrassed by diplomatic intrigues and forces beyond its borders.
10	"Indian Summer of an Emperor"	1914
Franz Josef fears for Austria-Hungary's future in the hands of his reform-minded nephew and heir-presumptive Franz Ferdinand, especially because of the time that he spends with Kaiser Wilhelm II. However, he soon gets news of the assassination of Franz Ferdinand and his lower-ranked wife, Sophie Chotek, in Sarajevo. Initially, he accepts the "providence" of the event and refuses calls to mobilise the army and to punish Serbia. However, the Kaiser quickly insists on immediate and decisive action against Serbia, dismissing the preparedness and will of Russia, downplaying the military threat from France and setting a chain of events in motion that leads to the outbreak of World War I.
11	"Tell the King the Sky Is Falling"	1914–1916
With the resolve and the morale of the Russian army plummeting, Nicholas II decides to leave the capital to take personal command of the army, leaving Alexandra behind as his eyes and ears in Petrograd. His son Alexei soon joins him, but his frail constitution leads to another health scare. Alexandra, becoming increasingly unpopular and insecure, has come to rely heavily on the advice and cures of faith healer Grigori Rasputin, who also advises the Empress on which religious people should be in government. As a result, Alexander Protopopov is appointed as a minister, but his ineptitude leads other politicians, such as Mikhail Rodzianko and Alexander Trepov, to scheme for change.
12	"The Secret War"	1917
As World War I continues, Kaiser Wilhelm II, tiring from his responsibilities, allows Ludendorff, Hindenburg, Admiral von Holtzendorff, and Bethmann-Hollweg to propose riskier strategies for 'total victory' (such as unrestricted submarine warfare against neutral shipping). With Rasputin now dead, Alexander Kerensky incites open revolt in the Duma, which supports his insistence on the abdication of the Tsar. The Kaiser, fearful of creating a "Bolshevik nemesis", reluctantly allows Lenin and his compatriots to travel through Germany from exile in Switzerland. With the help of industrialist Helphand, the Russians finally arrive to a heroic homecoming in St. Petersburg.
13	"End Game"	1918
With Franz Joseph now dead (succeeded by his grand-nephew, Charles I & IV) and the Romanovs executed by the Bolsheviks, Kaiser Wilhelm II is the lone eagle still standing. German troops move west from the now peaceful Russian front, but the Spring Offensive fails, with the Allies making surprising advances across France and Belgium. Wilhelm's optimism of his soldiers' fighting will is not fully shared by the General Staff, particularly because of the desperate erosion of the home front. Wilhelm's cousin Prince Max is made chancellor as a concession to reform, but that only hastens the clamour for change. The 1918 German Revolution finally forces the Kaiser's abdication, and he flees into exile in the Netherlands.

== Cast ==
Cast, in order of first appearance, and sorted by episode and empire. The narrator of the series was Michael Hordern (ep. 1–3, 5–8, 11–13).

Austria-Hungary
- Pamela Brown as Archduchess Sophia (ep. 1)
- Miles Anderson (ep. 1) and Laurence Naismith (ep. 4, 9–10) as Emperor Franz Josef
- Diane Keen (ep. 1) and Rachel Gurney (ep. 4) as Empress Elisabeth
- Sandor Elès as Count Andrassy (ep. 1)
- Ann Penfold as Helene (ep. 1)
- Donald Gee as Count Majlath (ep. 1)
- Kathleen Michael as Hildegarde (ep. 1)
- Noel Fredericks as Aide to Franz Josef (ep. 1)
- Emrys James as Count Taaffe (ep. 4)
- Anthony Newlands as Philip of Coburg (ep. 4)
- James Cossins as Count Josl Hoyos (ep. 4)
- Frank Wylie as Police Commissar Gorup (ep. 4)
- Susan Tracy as Crown Princess Stephanie (ep. 4)
- Irene Hamilton as Baroness Vetsera, mother of Countess Vetsera (ep. 4)
- Rosamund Greenwood as Fraulein von Ferenczy (ep. 4)
- Kenneth Benda as Professor Widerhoffer (ep. 4)
- Carleton Hobbs as Abbot Grünböck (ep. 4)
- Michael Sheard as Losehek (ep. 4)
- Patrick Durkin as Bratfisch (ep. 4)
- Vernon Dobtcheff as Count Stookau (ep. 4)
- David Neal as Baltazzi (ep. 4)
- Olaf Pooley as Police President Baron Krauss (ep. 4)
- Leon Lissek as Police Agent Bayer (ep. 4)
- John Herrington as Stationmaster (ep. 4)
- Nora Swinburne as Katharine Schratt (ep. 10)
- Peter Woodthorpe as Archduke Franz Ferdinand (ep. 10)
- T. P. McKenna as Count Conrad von Hotzendorf (ep. 10)
- Michael McStay as Count Montenuovo (ep. 10)
- Neville Barber as Count Paar (ep. 10)
- Peter Copley as Bethmann-Hollweg (ep. 10, 12)
- George Merritt as Ketterl (ep. 10)
- Robert Tayman as First Adjutant (ep. 10)
- Ian Ricketts as Second Adjutant (ep. 10)
- Noel Davis as Austrian Ambassador (ep. 10)
- Brian Hawksley as Sir Arthur Nicolson (ep. 10)
- Roy McArthur as Archduke Karl (ep. 10)
- Heather Page as Archduchess Zita (ep. 10)
- Clyde Pollitt as Kottwitz (ep. 10)
- Melanie Peck as Maid (ep. 10)
- Jay Neill as Heller (ep. 10)
German Empire
- Curt Jürgens as Bismarck (ep. 2–3)
- Gemma Jones as Vicky (ep. 2–3)
- Maurice Denham as Kaiser Wilheim I (ep. 2–3)
- Denis Lill as Fritz (ep. 2–3)
- Basil Henson as Von Moltke (ep. 2)
- Geoffrey Chater as Charles (ep. 2)
- Roger Hammond as Albrecht (ep. 2)
- Perlita Neilson (ep. 2) and Mavis Edwards (ep. 5) as Queen Victoria
- Frank Thornton as Prince Albert (ep. 2)
- Anthony Roye as Dr. Martin (ep. 2)
- Antony Carrick as Dr. Wegner (ep. 2)
- Sandra Clark as Wally (ep. 2–3)
- Mike Elles (ep. 2) and Derek Francis (ep. 9) as "Bertie" (Edward VII)
- Adam Cunliffe (ep. 2) and Barry Foster (ep. 3, 5, 7, 9–10, 12–13) as "Willy" (Kaiser Wilheim II)
- Frederick Jaeger as Holstein (ep. 3)
- John Barcroft as Eulenberg (ep. 3)
- David McKail as Mackenzie (ep. 3)
- Valerie Phillips (ep. 3) and Eve Pearce (ep. 12–13) as Empress Dona
- Peter Dyneley as Von Bülow (ep. 7, 9)
- Marius Goring as Hindenburg (ep. 12–13)
- Michael Bates as Ludendorff (ep. 12–13)
- Eric Carte as Aide to Kaiser (ep. 12)
- Griffith Jones as Hintze (ep. 13)
- Laurence Hardy as Prince Max (ep. 12–13)
- Colin Baker as Crown Prince (Little Willy) (ep. 12–13)
- John Robinson as Müller (ep. 12–13)
- Geoffrey Toone as Groener (ep. 12–13)
- Erik Chitty as Hertling (ep. 12–13)
- Peter Schofield as Ebert (ep. 12–13)
- Kevin Brennan as Bentinck (ep. 12–13)
- Jon Croft as Sergeant (ep. 12–13)
- Alan Cullen as Admiral Von Holtzendorf (ep. 12)
Russian Empire
- Tony Jay as Alexander III (ep. 3, 5)
- Gayle Hunnicutt as Alexandra (ep. 5, 7–9, 11–12)
- Charles Kay as Nicholas II (ep. 5–9, 11–12)
- Patrick Stewart as Ulyanov (Lenin) (ep. 5–6, 12)
- Lynn Farleigh as Nadezhda Krupskaya (ep. 5–6, 12)
- Freddie Jones as Witte (ep. 5, 8)
- Jan Francis as Kschessinka (ep. 5)
- Ursula Howells as Marie (ep. 5)
- David Collings as Milyukov (ep. 5, 12)
- Isla Blair (ep. 5) and Ann Castle (ep. 11) as Ella
- Robert Brown as Uncle Serge (ep. 5,7)
- John Nightingale as Cousin Serge (ep. 5)
- Howard Rawlinson as Constantin (ep. 5)
- Kevin Stoney as Father John (ep. 5)
- Denzil Ellis as Wahl (ep. 5)
- John Sanderson as Young Nicholas (ep. 5)
- Leila Hart as Singer (ep. 5)
- Bruce Purchase as Von Plehve (ep. 6–7)
- Edward Wilson as Martov (ep. 6)
- Michael Kitchen as Trotsky (ep. 5–6)
- Mary Wimbush as Zasulich (ep. 6)
- Paul Eddington as Plekhanov (ep. 6)
- Peter Weston as Baumann (ep. 6)
- David Freedman as Lieber (ep. 6)
- Julian Fox as Tupuridze (ep. 6)
- Raymond Witch as Martynov (ep. 6)
- Svandis Jons as Alexandrova (ep. 6)
- Robert O'Mahoney as Krasikov (ep. 6)
- Kenneth Colley as Father Gapon (ep. 7–8)
- John Turner as Prince Mirsky (ep. 7)
- John Welsh as Archbishop (ep. 7)
- Robert Keegan as Ivan Fullon (ep. 7)
- Michael Golden as Putilov (ep. 7)
- Roy Sampson as Danilov (ep. 7)
- David Dodimead as Kokovtsev (ep. 7–8)
- James Mellor as Kourapatkin (ep. 7)
- John Quarmbyas Lambsdorf (ep. 7)
- Alan Hockey as Doctor (ep. 7)
- Glynne Thomas as Spokesman (ep. 7)
- Eileen Helsby as Mother (ep. 7)
- Roger Nott and John Surman as Secretaries (ep. 7)
- Sharon Terry (ep. 7) and Hetty Baynes (ep. 11) as Tatiana
- Michael Bryant as Ratchkovsky (ep. 8)
- David Swift as Trepov (ep. 8)
- John Stratton as Hesse (ep. 8)
- Victor Winding as Azeff (ep. 8)
- Peter Pratt as Singer (ep. 8)
- Rio Fanning as Petitioner (ep. 8)
- Arnold Peters as Clerk (ep. 8)
- Michael Cotterill as Valet de Chambre (ep. 8)
- Peter Jolley as Tsar's Aide (ep. 8)
- Desmond Cullum-Jones as Police Sergeant (ep. 8)
- John Beardmore as Police Inspector (ep. 8)
- Paul Haley as Medal Sergeant (ep. 8)
- Peter Vaughan as Isvolsky (ep. 9)
- John Bennett as Clemenceau (ep. 9)
- John Moffatt as Aehrenthal (ep. 9)
- Frank Middlemass as Stolypin (ep. 9)
- Andrew Keir as Wickham Steed (ep. 9)
- Shirley Dixon as Mme. Izvolsky (ep. 9)
- Tom Criddle as Sir Edward Grey (ep. 9)
- Ed Devereaux as Purtales (ep. 9)
- Haydn Wood as Officer (ep. 9)
- Peter Whitaker as Secretary (ep. 9)
- Charles Gray as Rodzianko (ep. 11)
- John Phillips as Grand Duke Nicholas (ep. 11)
- Nigel Stock as General Alexeiev (ep. 11)
- Hugh Burden as Protopopov (ep. 11–12)
- Michael Aldridge as Rasputin (ep. 11)
- Frank Mills as A. F. Trepov (ep. 11)
- Rosalie Crutchley as Michen (ep. 11)
- Miriam Margolyes as Anna Vyrubova (ep. 11)
- Piers Flint-Shipman as Alexis (ep. 11)
- Pippa Vickers as Anastasia (ep. 11)
- Alix Crista as Mounia (ep. 11)
- Anthony Collin as Manus (ep. 11)
- Barbara Keogh as Vara (ep. 11)
- Martha Nairn as Olga (ep. 11)
- Prue Clarke as Maria (ep. 11)
- Michael Gough as Helphand (ep. 12)
- Tom Conti as Glazkov (ep. 12)
- Jim Norton as Kerensky (ep. 12)
- Malcolm Terris as Bronsky (ep. 12)
- Esmond Knight as General Ruzski (ep. 12)
- Basil Clarke as Voeykov (ep. 12)
- Ronald Govey as Chkheidze (ep. 12)
- John Rae as Prince Lvov (ep. 12)
- Tom Kempinski as Bolshevik Soldier (ep. 12)
- John Rhys-Davies as Zinoviev (ep. 12)
- John Rees as Officer of Russian Army (ep. 12)
- Leonard Fenton as Markov (ep. 12)
- Colin Jeavons as Printer (ep. 12)
- Isabelle Stanton as Socialist Émigré (ep. 12)
- Ann Zelda as Helphand's Secretary (ep. 12)

== Music ==
The music accompanying the main title and credits is the Trauermarsch (Funeral March), the first movement of Mahler's Symphony No. 5. The closing theme music is the central section from the first movement of Shostakovich's Symphony No. 6.

== Reception ==
One positive review of the series states: "This ambitious series captivates the audience by depicting the years of revolution, in which the well cemented monarchies of central and eastern Europe slowly disintegrate. However, the show does not attach any sentiments with royalty or the happenings in wake of its collapse."

== Media ==
Fall of Eagles was released on video and DVD in autumn 2004 in the United Kingdom, with the release including a photo gallery and a comprehensive 40-page historical notes booklet written by Andy Priestner providing further details on the historical events and characters in the series. It includes new interviews with Gayle Hunnicutt (The Golden Bowl, Dallas, The Martian Chronicles), Charles Kay (Edge of Darkness, To Serve Them All My Days) and director David Cunliffe (The Onedin Line, The Sandbaggers, Victoria and Albert). It was later released in May 2006 in the United States, without the companion booklet.

A separate book based on the series titled The Fall of Eagles: The Death of the Great European Dynasties (ISBN 9780340216415) by Cyrus Leo Sulzberger II was first published by Crown in 1981.
