= Khvostov =

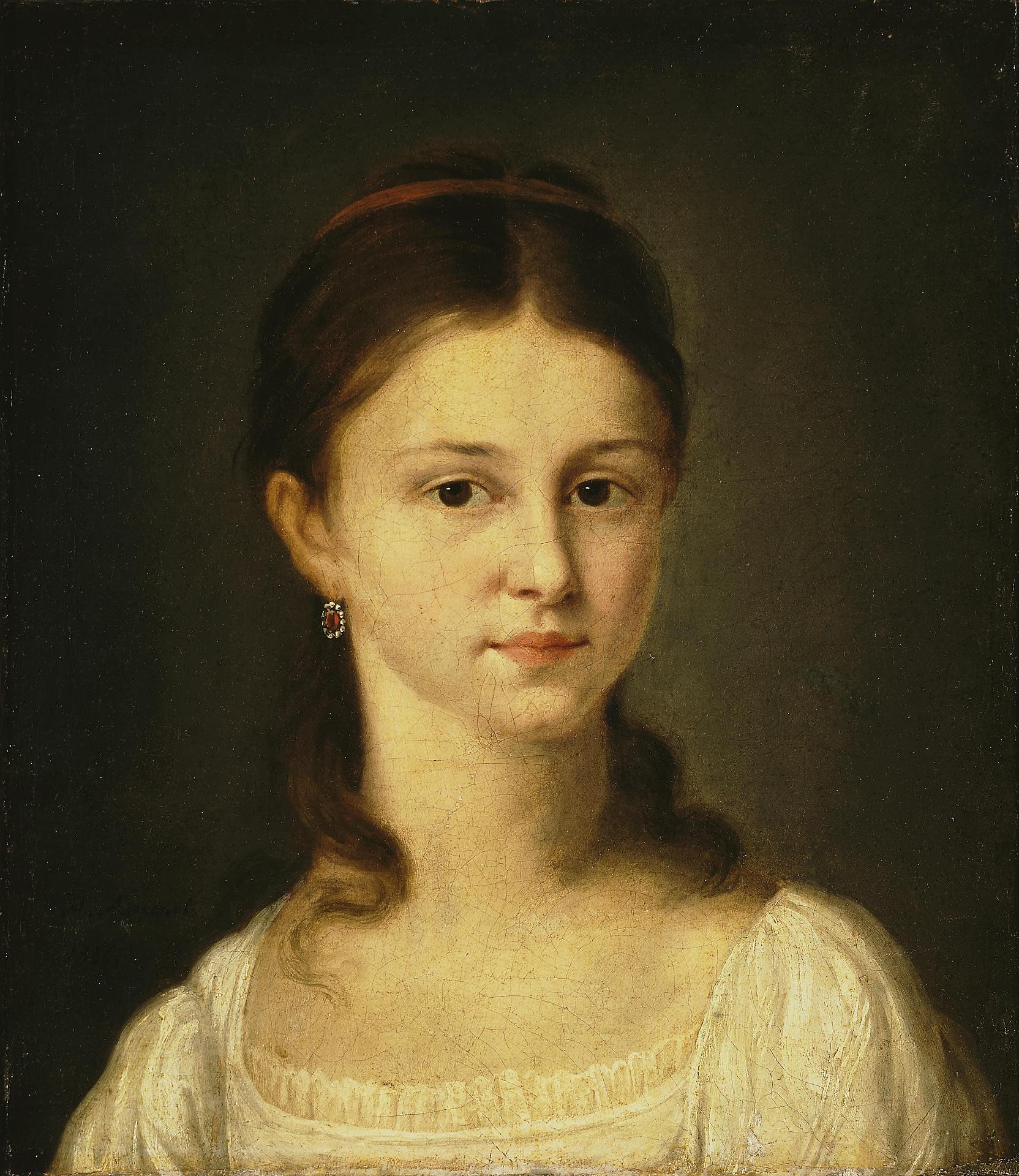
Portrait of Mrs Khvostova

Khvostov or Hvostov (Russian: Хвостов, from хвост meaning tail) is a Russian masculine surname, its feminine counterpart is Khvostova or Hvostova. It may refer to:

- Alexander Khvostenko-Khvostov (1895–1967), Ukrainian avant-garde artist
- Aleksandr Khvostov (1857–1922), Russian politician
- Aleksey Khvostov (1872–1918), Russian statesman and politician
- Dmitry Khvostov (1757–1835), Russian poet
- Dmitry Khvostov (basketball) (born 1989), Russian basketball player
- Evgeny Khvostov (born 1981), Russian ice hockey defenceman
- Mikhail Khvostov (born 1949), Belarusian ambassador
