= Nikolai Golitsyn =

Prime Minister of the Russian Empire in 1917

His Serene Highness Nikolai Golitsyn
- Николай Голицын
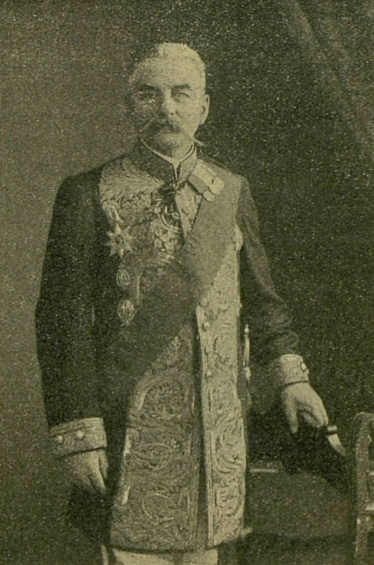
- Golitsyn in 1912

Prime Minister of Russia
- In office 9 January 1917 – 12 March 1917
- Monarch: Nicholas II
- Preceded by: Alexander Trepov
- Succeeded by: Georgy Lvov (As Minister-Chairman of the Russian Provisional Government)

Personal details
- Born: 12 April 1850 Moscow, Russian Empire
- Died: 2 July 1925 (aged 75) Leningrad, Russian SFSR, Soviet Union
- Education: Tsarskoye Selo Lyceum

Prince Nikolai Dmitriyevich Golitsyn (Russian: Никола́й Дми́триевич Голи́цын; 12 April 1850 – 2 July 1925) was a Russian aristocrat, monarchist and the last prime minister of the Russian Empire. He was in office from 29 December 1916 (O.S.) or 9 January 1917 (N.S.) until his government resigned after the outbreak of the February Revolution.

== Biography ==
Golitsyn was born in Porechye, a village in the Moscow Governorate near Mozhaisk, into the noble Golitsyn family. His father was Dmitry Borisovich Golitsyn (1803–1864) who came from Bolshiye Vyazyomy, the family estate. Nikolai passed his childhood in the Dorogobuzhsky District. He graduated from the Imperial Alexander Lyceum in 1871 and entered the Ministry of the Interior, where he was appointed to the Łomża Governorate (Congress Poland). He became vice-governor of Archangelsk (1879); vice-director of the Economics Department of the Ministry of Internal Affairs (1884); Governor of the guberniyas of Arkhangelsk (1885), Kaluga (1893), and Tver (1897). He was appointed senator in 1903. As a plenipotentiary of the Red Cross in Turgay and Uralskaya Oblasts and Saratov Governorate he organized aid for famine-stricken areas (1907–1908). He was a member of the State Council (1912) and chairman of the commission to render assistance to the Russian prisoners of war abroad (1915). He was a deputy chairman of one of Empress Alexandra's charity commissions.

=== Prime minister ===
On 25 December he was invited by Empress Alexandra for an interview, but received by the tsar. A hesitating Prince Golitsyn did not want to succeed prime minister Alexander Trepov, insisted on the resignation of the Minister of Internal Affairs Alexander Protopopov and begged Nicholas II to cancel his appointment, citing his lack of preparation for the role of prime minister. The tsar refused, but Pavel Ignatieff, Alexander Makarov and Dmitry Shuvayev were replaced; Nikolai Dobrovolsky was appointed. The Council of Ministers officially met once or twice a week (seven meetings in January, six in February). The main concern of the government was "food and transport." The most important thing, according to Prince Golitsyn, was the convocation of the Duma and the desire to work together with it and somehow make this work possible. The government discussed the timeframe for resuming the Duma sessions: it was originally scheduled to open on 12 January, then - on 31 January, but in the end, it was postponed until 14 February. Protopopov, who excused himself many times and did not attend the meetings, suggested dissolution or postponing the Duma even further.

Despite being the oldest member of the council (Golitsyn was 66, while the others were 36 to 63 years old), he was not a leader. (His advanced years led him to regularly fall asleep during State Council meetings.) In January 1917 two rival institutions, the Duma and the Petrograd Soviet, competed for power. On 8 February, at the wish of the tsar, Nikolay Maklakov, together with Protopopov drafted the text of the manifesto on the dissolution of the Duma (cancelled and scheduled to resume on 14 February 1917). On 14 February mass demonstrations broke out. On 15 February Alexander Kerensky made a speech in the Duma that almost called for the assassination of the emperor. A week later the demonstrations on Nevsky Prospekt became more serious. On 25th members of the government gathered at Golitsyn's apartment at Konnogvardeyskiy Bul'var, 13. Belyaev suggested his colleagues remove Protopopov from his post, as he saw in him the main cause of unrest.

On 26 February, the tsar ordered the army to suppress the rioting by force, but troops began to mutiny, joined the protesters, and demanded a new constitutional government. In the evening the meeting of the Duma was prorogued, although Golitsyn and Nikolai Pokrovsky opposed its dissolution. Golitsyn used a (signed, but not yet dated ukaze which had been given to Trepov) declaring that his majesty had decided to interrupt the Imperial Duma until 1 April, leaving it with no legal authority to act. The deputies refused to leave and a private committee of Duma members was formed to help restore order.

=== Downfall and execution ===
The Council of Ministers met the evening of 27 February 1917 and submitted its resignation to the emperor, asking Grand Duke Michael Alexandrovich to temporarily act as regent, which he refused. Following Nicholas's decision to abdicate, the Provisional Committee of the State Duma ordered former ministers and senior officials arrested. Golitsyn was arrested by police and transferred to the Peter and Paul Fortress for interrogation, where he was starved and tortured, then released on 13 March.

On 21 April 1917 he was again arrested by police and interrogated by the Extraordinary Commission of Inquiry of the Provisional Government. After the assumption of power by the Bolsheviks, Golitsyn was allowed to leave but decided to stay in Russia, earning his living by repairing shoes in Moscow or Petrograd and guarding vegetable gardens in Rybinsk. During the period from 1920 to 1924 he was twice arrested by the OGPU, on the suspicion of connection with counterrevolutionaries. After his third arrest (on 12 February 1925), he was executed on 2 July 1925 in Leningrad on the charge of participating in a "counter-revolutionary monarchist organization".

== Family ==
Prince Nikolai Golitsyn married in Saint Petersburg on 7 April 1881 Evgenia Andrejevna von Grünberg (Saint-Petersburg, 18 April 1864 - Nice, 18 July 1934). The couple had six children:

- Prince Dimitri Nikolayevich (Archangelsk, 1882 - Nice, 1928), married Frances Simpson Stevens
- Prince Nikolai Nikolayevich (Archangelsk, 1883 - executed at Solovki, 1931)
- Prince Alexander Nikolayevich (St. Petersburg, 1885 - Toulon, 1974), in exile married the Imperial Princess Marina Petrovna of Russia, daughter of Grand Duke Peter Nikolaevich of Russia.
- Prince Evgeni Nikolayevich (Archangelsk, 1888 - Paris, 1928)
- Princess Sofia Nikolayevna (1886 - 1891)
- Princess Olga Nikolayevna (1891 - 1892)

== Sources ==
- Igor SHUMEYKO The last prime of the empire
- V.I. Gurko. Features And Figures Of The Past. Government And Opinion In The Reign Of Nicholas II.
- Massie, Robert K., Nicholas and Alexandra, New York, Ballantine Books, 1967, ISBN 0-345-43831-0.
- Smith, Douglas, Former People: the Final Days of the Russian Aristocracy. Farrar, Straus and Giroux, 2012

Political offices
Preceded by Alexander Trepov	Prime Minister of Russia; 9 January 1917 [O.S. 27 December 1916] – 12 March [O.S. 27 February] 1917	Succeeded by Georgy Lvov
