= Panin =

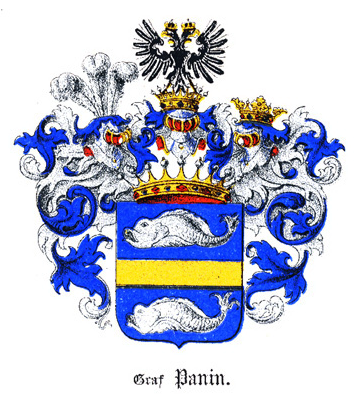
Coat of Arms of the Panin family

The Panin family was an old and prominent Russian noble family, known since the beginning of the 16th century. Members of the family held the title of Count in the Russian Empire, granted to them on 22 September 1767 by Catherine the Great. Panin (Russian: Па́нин), or Panina (feminine; Па́нина) is also a Russian surname.

"Panin" may refer to:

- Members of a Russian noble Panin family
  - Count Nikita Ivanovich Panin
  - Count Petr Ivanovich Panin
  - Count Nikita Petrovich Panin
  - Count Alexander Panin
  - Count Viktor Nikitich Panin, a Russian statesman
  - General Count Petr Ivanovich Panin
  - Count Gerard Panin
- Adam Panin
- Aleksei Panin (born 1977), Russian actor
- Andrey Panin (1962–2013), Russian actor and director
- Boris Panin (1848–1917), Prime Minister
- Cristian Panin (born 1978), Romanian footballer
- Gennady Panin (born 1981), Russian politician
- Ivan Panin (1855–1942)
- Ivan Panin (mathematician) (born 1959), Russian mathematician
- Nikita Fyodorovich Panin († 1652)
- Nikolai Panin (1872–1956), Russian figure skater and Olympic champion
- Pavel Panin (1909–1943), a Soviet aircraft pilot and Hero of the Soviet Union
- Stepan Panin
- Vasily Panin

"Panina" may refer to:

- Countess Sofia Panina (1871–1956), philanthropist and Kadet Party politician
- Valentina Panina, a Russian actress.
- Varya Panina (Varvara Panina, Varja Panina), (1872 – May 28, 1911), A famous Russian Gypsy romance singer of the beginning of the 20th century
- Several people called Natalya Panina
