= Khvostenko =

Khvostenko (Ukrainian: Хвостенко, from хвост meaning tail) is a gender-neutral Ukrainian surname that may refer to

- Alexander Khvostenko-Khvostov (1895–1967), Ukrainian avant-garde artist
- Alexei Khvostenko (1940–2004), Russian avant-garde poet, singer-songwriter and artist
- Oksana Khvostenko (born 1977), Ukrainian biathlete

== See also ==
- Khvostov
