= Alexander Protopopov =

Russian publicist and politician (1866–1918)

- Александр Протопопов
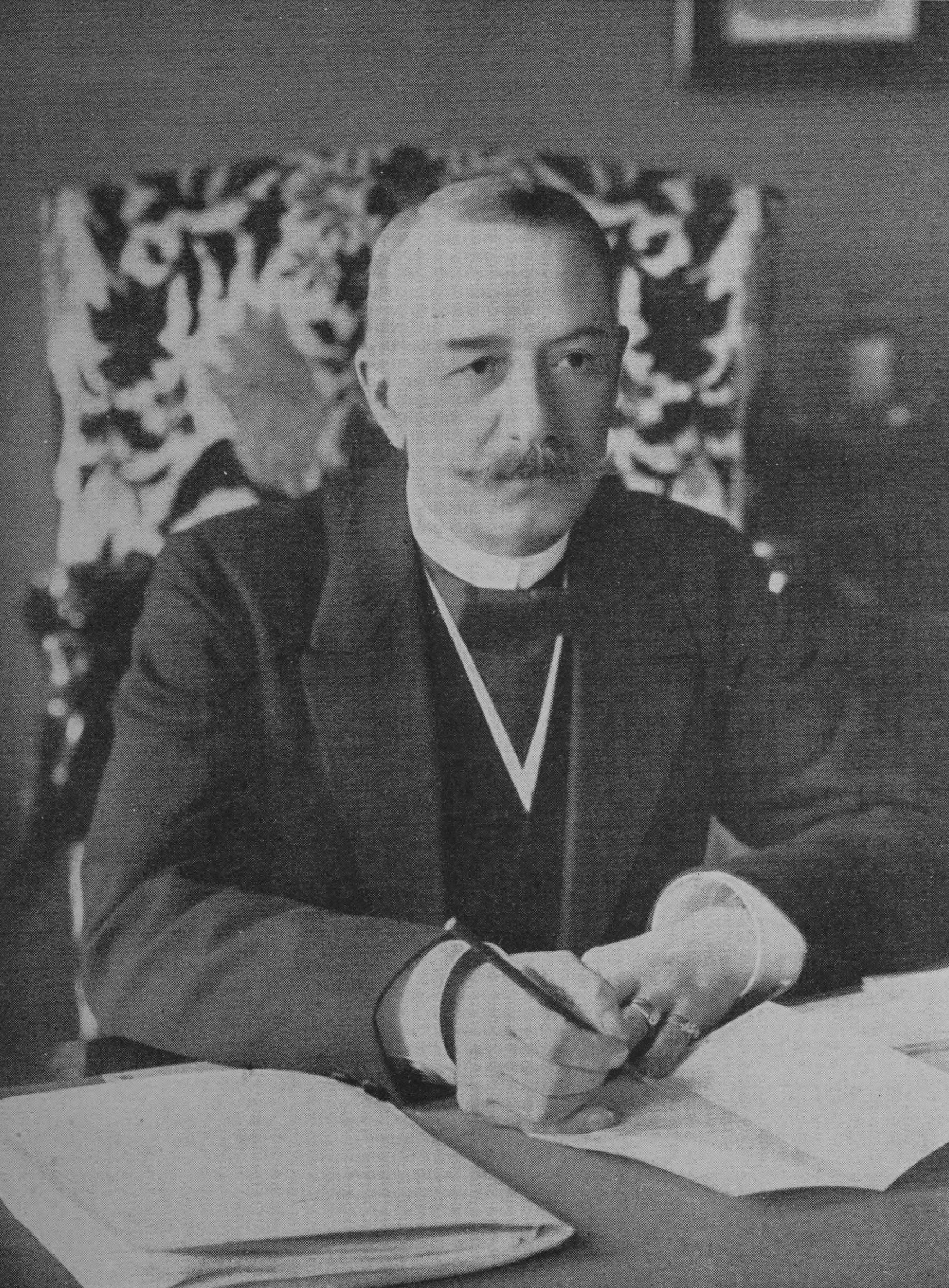
- Protopopov in 1918

Minister of Interior
- In office 6 September 1916 – 28 February 1917
- Monarch: Nicholas II
- Preceded by: Aleksandr Khvostov
- Succeeded by: Georgy Lvov

Personal details
- Born: Alexander Dmitryevich Protopopov; 18 December 1866 Maresevo, Nizhny Novgorod Governorate, Russian Empire
- Died: 27 October 1918 (aged 51) Moscow, Russian SFSR
- Party: Union of October 17
- Occupation: Politician

Alexander Dmitrievich Protopopov (Russian: Алекса́ндр Дми́триевич Протопо́пов; 30 December [O.S. 18 December] 1866 – 27 October 1918) was a Russian publicist and politician who served as the interior minister of the Russian Empire from September 1916 to February 1917.

Protopopov became a leading liberal politician in Russia after the Russian Revolution of 1905 and was elected to the State Duma with the Octobrist Party. Protopopov was appointed interior minister with the support of Empress Alexandra during World War I, but his inexperience and mental instability failed to relieve the effects of the war on Russia and contributed to the decline of the imperial government. Protopopov remained Minister of the Interior despite attempts to remove him for his policy failures, worsening mental state, and close relationship with Grigori Rasputin until he was forced to resign shortly before the February Revolution, and was later captured and killed by the Bolsheviks during the October Revolution.

According to Bernard Pares, Protopopov "was merely a political agent; but his intentions as to policy, considering the post which he held, are of historical interest."

== Early life ==
Alexander Dmitrievich Protopopov was born on 18 December 1866 in Marasevo, Lukoyanovsky Uyezd, Nizhny Novgorod Governorate, the son of a wealthy member of the local nobility who owned extensive land holdings and a textile factory. Protopopov attended the select Nicholas Cavalry College as a cadet before being commissioned into the Horse Grenadier Regiment of the Imperial Guard. After leaving the army in 1889, Protopopov studied law and became a director of his father's textile factory. At some point, Protopopov moved to Saint Petersburg where he became active in the financial community.

== Political career ==
Protopopov was elected in 1907 as a member of the centralist Octobrist Party as a delegate to both the Third and Fourth Dumas. In 1912, Protopopov was elected Marshal of Nobility of Karsunsky Uyezd. In 1916, was elected as Marshal of Simbirsk Governorate and also became president of the Council of the Metal-Working Industry, controlled by banks dependent on German syndicates.

In November 1913 or May 1914, Protopopov was appointed as vice-president of the Imperial Duma under Mikhail Rodzianko, serving as Deputy Speaker from 1914 to 1916. Protopopov founded a newspaper Russkaya Volya ("The Will of Russia") which was financed by the banks and appointed Nikolay Gredeskul and Alexander Amfiteatrov as journalists. According to Joseph T. Fuhrmann, Protopopov was hospitalized from the end of 1915 for six full months in the clinic of Peter Badmayev. In Spring 1916, at the request of Rodzianko, Protopopov led a delegation of Duma members with Pavel Milyukov to strengthen the ties with the Entente powers, Russia's western allies in World War I. Protopopov met with the German industrialist and politician Hugo Stinnes, the banker Fritz M. Warburg, and the Swedish Minister of Foreign Affairs Knut Wallenberg. Protopopov faced a violently hostile reception from the pro-British Russian liberals upon his return from France and the United Kingdom, and in self-defense alleged that Warburg had initiated the talks. Protopopov's secret contacts on peace and a swap between Russia and Germany became a scandal, which according to The New York Times was an indication of the rapprochement between the Russian and German Governments. Protopopov was widely suspected of contacts with German diplomat Hellmuth Lucius von Stoedten. In 1925, the Nazi journalist Theodor Fritsch rewrote the story, alleging Warburg had wrecked Imperial Germany, advanced the Communist cause, and changed the entire course of European history.

=== Minister of Interior ===
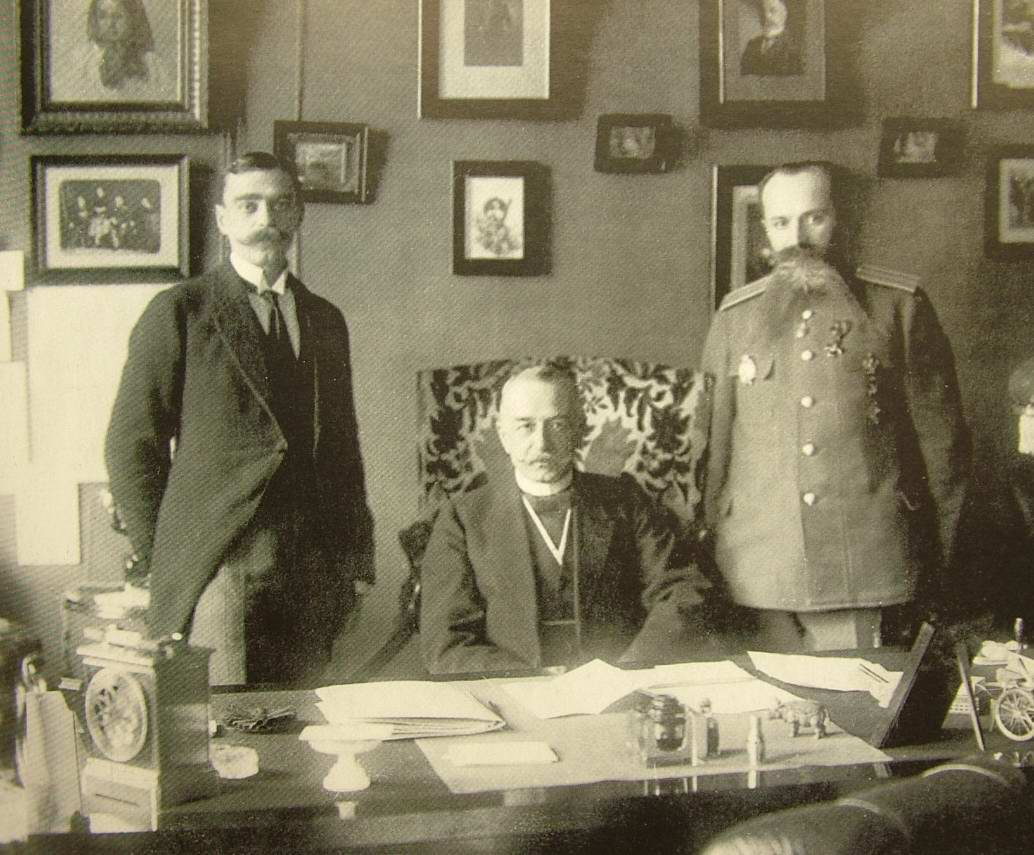
Alexander Protopopov and two aides, September 1916

On 20 July 1916, Protopopov formally met with Tsar Nicholas II who described him as "a man I like very much". Alexander Kerensky had described him as "handsome, elegant, captivating .... moderately liberal and always pleasant". Repeatedly, Empress Alexandra urged her husband to appoint Protopopov as Minister of the Interior as placing the vice-president of the Duma in a key post might improve the relations between the Duma and the monarchy. Although impressed by Protopopov's charm, Nicholas was initially doubtful about his suitability for a position that included responsibility for police and food supplies at a time of instability and shortages. Protopopov had no bureaucratic experience and knew little of the police department. However, the tsar approved his appointment as head of the Ministry of Interior some time between 16 and 20 September 1916. According to Richard Pipes, Protopopov received carte blanche to run the country. Although earlier considered fairly liberal, Protopopov saw his new role as that of preserving Tsarist autocracy. With the tsar absent at the Stavka headquarters, the government of Russia appeared managed as a kind of personal concern between the empress, Grigori Rasputin and Protopopov, with the auxiliary assistance of Anna Vyrubova. Protopopov continued the reactionary policies of his predecessor, Boris Stürmer, with support from the empress.

According to Rodzianko and Bernard Pares, by this point Protopopov was mentally unstable and his speeches were incoherent. "In spite of his planning on paper, he seems never to have had any effective proposal for the solution of any of the grave and critical problems which he was there to settle". In October, Protopopov proposed to let a group of Petrograd bankers purchase all the Russian bread and distribute it through the country. Protopopov ordered the release of Vladimir Sukhomlinov, the former Minister of War who was arrested in a high-profile scandal regarding allegations of high treason and abuse of power, and accused responsibility for Russia's numerous early defeats in World War I. When the Russian public learned Protopopov had visited the now-destitute and despised Sukhomlinov at his apartment, he was heavily criticized in the Duma and damaged the reputation of the government. Protopopov intended to suppress public organizations, especially Zemgor and the War Industry Committees, to win back the support of the business world, which he knew better than anything else. In November, Protopopov sought the dissolution of the Duma.

Alexander Trepov, the new prime minister, informed Protopopov that he wished him to give up his post in the ministry of the interior and take over that of Commerce, but Protopopov refused. In November 1916, Trepov made the dismissal of Protopopov an indispensable condition of his accepting the presidency of the Council. The empress, who disliked Trepov, tried to retain Protopopov in his influential position in the ministry of the interior. On 14 November 1916 (O.S.), Trepov travelled to the Stavka to meet with the Tsar to discuss the growing crisis caused by World War I, but threatened to resign on the next day. On 17 November, Nikolai Pokrovsky was appointed as a foreign minister, but announced his resignation four times over disagreements with Protopopov. Pokrovsky favored the attraction of the American financial capital into the Russian economy. On 7 December, the cabinet demanded that Protopopov should go to the tsar and resign, but he was instead re-appointed as minister at the request of the tsarina. In December 1916, Protopopov banned the zemstvos from meeting without police agents in attendance. "Protopopov felt that this organization was dominated by a revolutionary salaried staff and that in general the demand of opposition activists for a role in food-supply matters was meant to further political, and not practical, aims". When the supply problems proved beyond Protopopov's capabilities to manage, he lifted registration requirements on Jewish residents of Moscow and other cities. Early 1917 Protopopov, who excused himself many times and did not attend the meetings of the government; he suggested dissolution or postponing the Duma even further. On 8 February, at the wish of the tsar, Nikolay Maklakov, together with Protopopov ..., drafted the text of the manifesto on the dissolution of the Duma. On February 27 [O.S. February 14], the Duma was dissolved and Protopopov was proclaimed dictator.

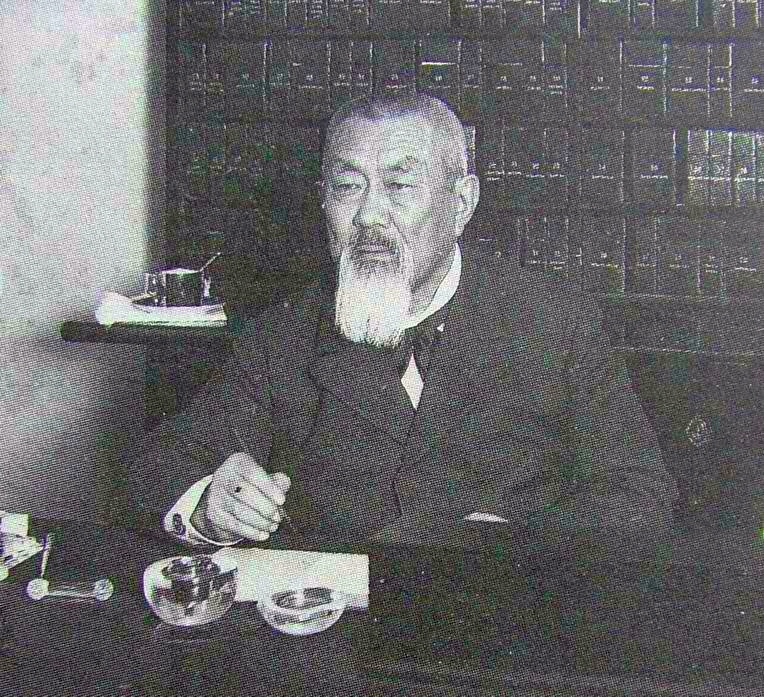
Protopopov was frequently treated by Peter Badmayev, a quack doctor close to the Russian imperial family.

== Relations with Rasputin ==
Grigori Rasputin had a closer relationship with Protopopov than with his predecessor Stürmer, and had known each other since 1912. Protopopov was suffering from the effects of advanced syphilis, which made him physically weak and mentally unstable, and resulted in a mystical and deeply superstitious condition. Protopopov was a frequent visitor to Peter Badmayev and Rasputin for treatment. On the evening of December 29 [O.S. December 16] 1916, Protopopov urged Rasputin not to visit Felix Yusupov that night. Rasputin however disregarded this advice and was murdered at the Yusupov Palace in Petrograd a few hours later. It is alleged that Protopopov subsequently sought advice from the dead Rasputin at seances.

== Revolution and death ==
On February 22, the workers of most of the big factories were on strike. On International Women's Day, March 8 [O.S. February 23] working women came out in the streets to demonstrate against starvation, war, and the tsardom. On 25 February 1917, during a session of the Council of Ministers gathered at prime minister Nikolai Golitsyn's apartment, Pokrovsky proposed the resignation of the whole government. Mikhail Belyaev suggested to remove Protopopov from his post, as he saw in him the main cause of unrest. The next day, Protopopov and Nikolay Iudovich Ivanov, the Commander of the Petrogradsky Military District, tried to suppress the February Revolution. However, Protopopov ignored warnings from the tsar's secret police, the Okhrana, that the ill-disciplined and poorly trained troops of the Petrograd garrison were unreliable. The reservist battalions of four regiments of the Russian Imperial Guard then mutinied and joined the revolutionaries. Pokrovsky reported about his negotiations with the Progressive Bloc led by Vasili Maklakov at the session of the Council of Ministers in the Mariinsky Palace, who spoke for the resignation of the government, but Protopopov refused to give up. Not long after his apartment and office were sacked by demonstrators, Protopopov took refuge at the Mariinsky Palace. According to M. Nelipa: "On February 28, Protopopov freely walked into the Tauride Palace at 11.00 p.m. and handed himself in". Protopopov was taken to the main hall, where the former cabinet ministers were surrounded by soldiers with fixed bayonets. The new Russian Provisional Government under Georgy Lvov requested him to retire from his post as Minister of the Interior, giving him the plea of "illness" if he desired. Protopopov and Prince Golitsyn were arrested and taken to the Peter and Paul Fortress that night.

In prison, Protopopov prepared detailed affidavits concerning his period in office, but he was soon taken to a military hospital suffering from hallucinations. After the October Revolution in November 1917 and the seizure of power by the Bolsheviks, Protopopov was transferred to Moscow and imprisoned in Taganka Prison. On 27 October 1918, Protopopov was executed by the Cheka, with his execution order implying his mental state as healthy.

Political offices
Preceded by Aleksandr Khvostov	Minister of Interior; 6 September 1916 O.S. – 28 February 1917	Succeeded by Georgy Lvov
