= Gombojab Tsybikov =

Russian-Mongolian Buryat explorer, ethnographer, and statesman (1873–1930)

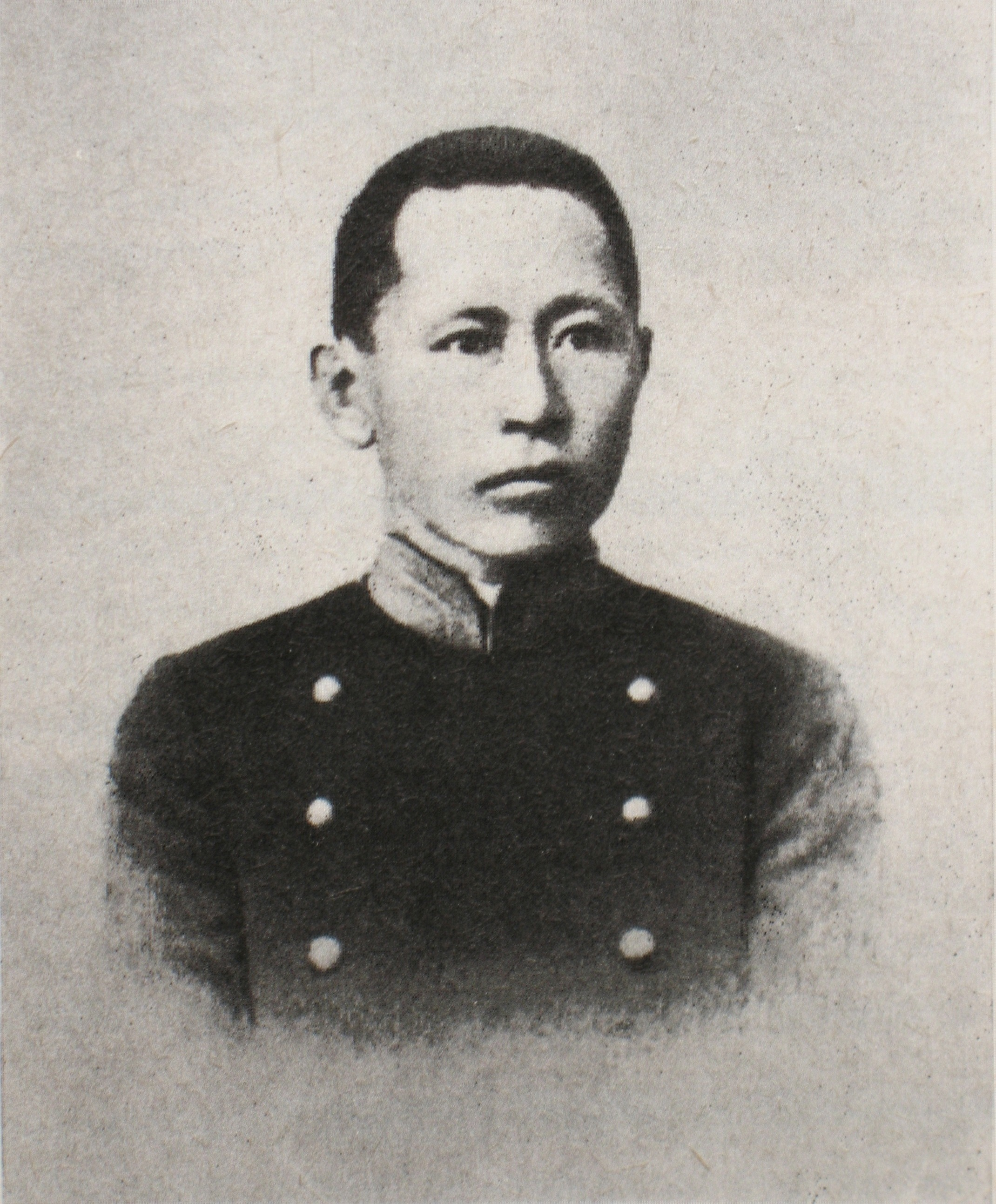
- Gombojab Tsybikov in a 1900 portrait
- Born: Gombojab Tsebekovich Tsybikov; 20 April 1873; Urda-Aga, Transbaikal Oblast, Russian Empire
- Died: 20 September 1930 (aged 57); Aginskoye, Buryat-Mongol ASSR, Soviet Union
- Occupations: Russian explorer of Tibet, social anthropologist, photographer, educator, statesman

Gombojab Tsybikov (Russian: Гомбожаб Цэбекович Цыбиков Gombozhab Tsebekovich Tsybikov; Buryat: Цэбэгэй Гомбожаб, Mongolian: Цэвэгийн Гомбожав, alternatively romanized as Gombozhab and Tsybikoff; 20 April 1873 – 20 September 1930) was a Russian explorer of Tibet from 1899 to 1902. Tsybikov specialized in ethnography, Buddhist Studies, and after 1917 was an important educator and statesman in Siberia and Mongolia.

Tsybikov is mostly credited for being the first photographer of Tibet, including Lhasa. His travelogue, issued in Russian in 1919, 1981, and 1991, and translated into several languages (Chinese, Czech, English, French, and Polish), included a lot of materials from Tibetan sources on Tibetan history and first-hand accounts on Tibetan affairs of the time, making it an important reference source.

== Biography ==
=== Early years ===
Gombojab Tsybikov, also during early life surnamed Montuev (Монтуев), was born to a Tibetan Buddhist family of Transbaikalian (Aga region) Buryats. Upon the traditional divisions, his family belonged to a Khori Buryat tribe of Kubdut, clan of Nokhoi Kubdut. His father Tsebek Montuyev studied Mongolian and Tibetan written languages and was locally elected to represent his kinsmen. Originally his idea was to send Gombojab to a Buddhist monastery to study, but later he sent his son to Aga (Orthodox Christian) parish school to study Russian, and later to Chita Gymnasium which Gombojab finished with honors. This earned him a Korf scholarship so that he could pursue a university degree. At that time he set his mind on becoming a medical doctor.

In mid-1890s in Tomsk University, while studying medicine, Gombojab Tsybikov met Dr Peter Badmayev who offered his support insisting that Tsybikov pursues a career in Asian affairs and studies in Saint Petersburg State University. Preparing for this new major, Tsybikov spent some time in Urga at Badmayev's Buryat school, studying Chinese, Mongolian, and Manchu languages.

In 1895 he enrolled at the Oriental Faculty of St Petersburg University with a grant from P. Badmaev. Later he lost Badmaev's support as it required Tsybikov's conversion from Buddhism to Christianity, which Tsybikov declined. He was able to continue studies with funds raised at his native place, and graduated summa cum laude in 1899.

=== Travel to Tibet ===
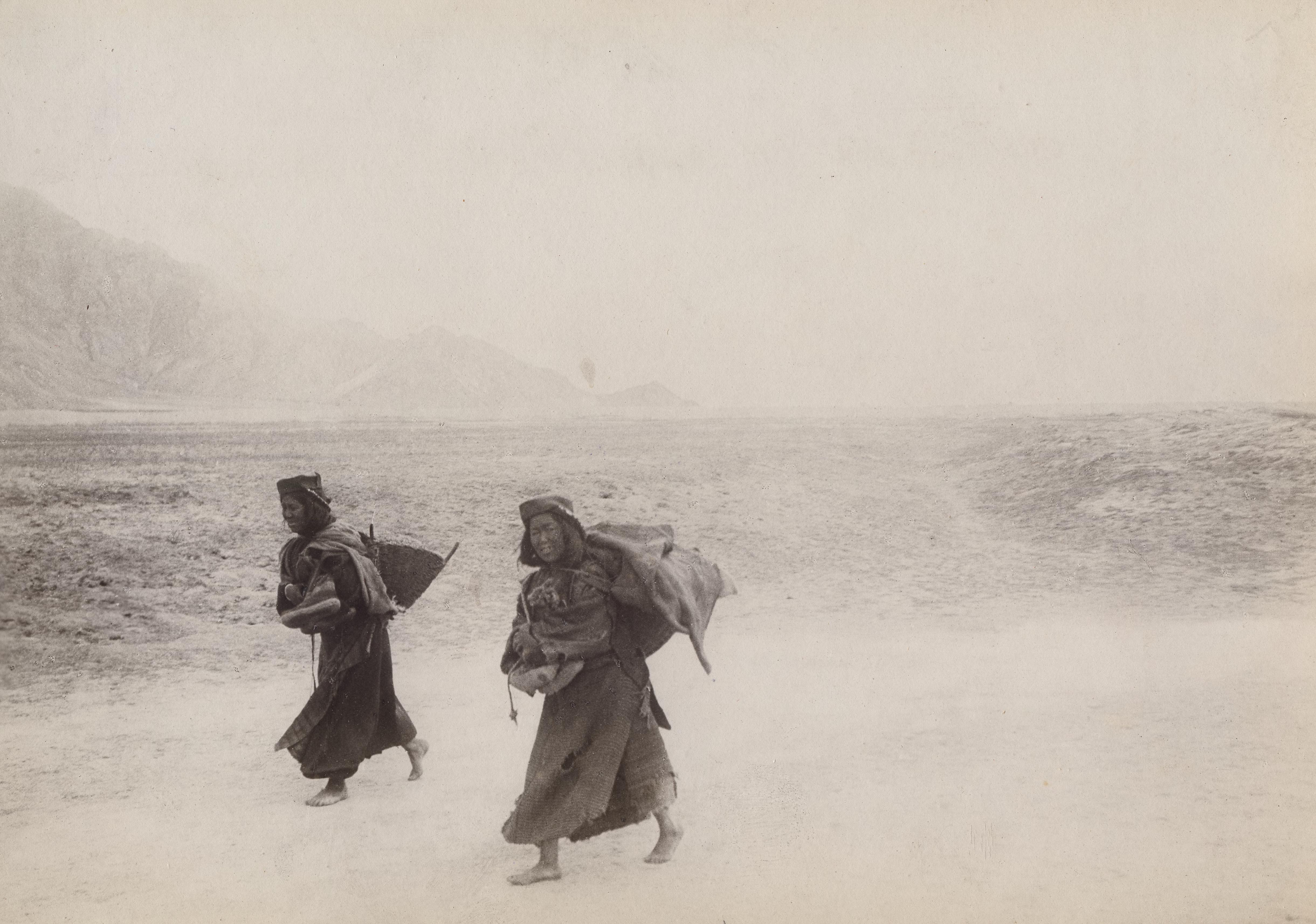
Photograph taken by Tsybikov or Norzunov. Two barefoot Tibetan women, carrying loads on their back, 1900-1

Soon after his graduation, the Academy sent Gombojab Tsybikov to explore Tibet. He left Russia by way of Mongolia, for Lhasa, Tibet, in a group of Buryat and Kalmyk pilgrims. He used experiences of British explorers to hide equipment and notes. The travel started in 1899 and finished in 1902. In Tibet proper, mostly in and around Lhasa, Tsybikov spent 888 days from 1900 to 1901. There, he secretly made around 200 pictures.

These, together with pictures made independently on the same pilgrimage by another, less documented Russian explorer, Kalmyk Ovshe Norzunov (Tsybikov arriving in Lhasa in August 1900, and Norzunov in the end of the year), were later to become the so-called Hallmark for National Geographic. The history of the magazine as it is known today, delivering pictures first, started with January 1905 edition of several full-page reprints of Tsybikov and Norzunov's pictures. Originally done because of the lack of texts, this publication gained the magazine wide success and popularity. He also had a formal audience with the Dalai Lama.

As the Dalai Lama fled the British expedition to Tibet in 1904 and resided for some time in Urga, Mongolia, he had series of talks with variety of Russian representatives. In these talks, Gombojab Tsybikov served as an interpreter. The Dalai Lama also received, with delight, an edition of Tsybikov's and Norzunov's pictures of Tibet issued by Russian Geographic Society.

However, after the catastrophic defeat in the Russo-Japanese War, the Russian Empire dismantled its active involvement in Tibetan affairs.

Tsybikov's other activities between the traveling and the Russian Revolution (1917) were academical. He got his travelogue ready for publishing, and started the translation of Je Tsongkhapa's Lamrim Chenmo. He also taught Mongolian and Tibetan in Vladivostok University.

=== After the Revolution ===
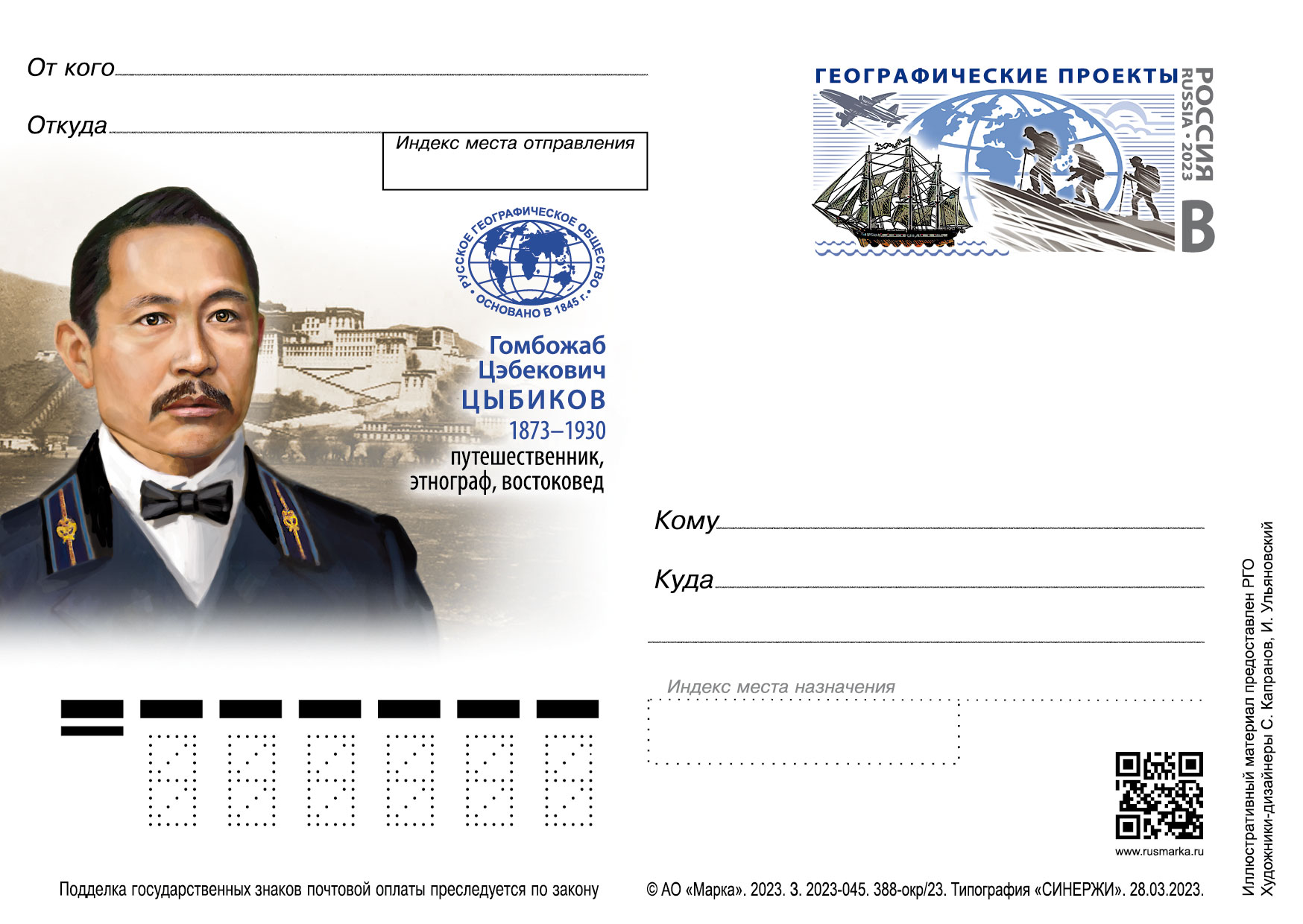
Tsybikov on a 2023 postal cover of Russia

In the Far Eastern Republic, Tsybikov became a deputy of the Constituent Assembly, and the member of Government of Buryat Autonomous Oblast.

In later years of his life he took to farming and was said by Nicholas Poppe to be very successful.

== Bibliography ==
=== Online publications in English ===
- Lhasa and Central Tibet at University of Wisconsin web site
- 22 photographic prints of Tsybikoff, G. Ts. at University of Wisconsin web site

=== In English ===
- Tsybikoff, G. Ts. Lhasa and Central Tibet // Smithsonian (Washington D.C. National Museum) Report for 1903, Pages 727–746. Publication 1534 / Washington: Government Printing Office, 1904.
- Tsybikoff G., Journey to Lhasa. // The Geographical Journal, Vol. XXIII, 1–1904. The Royal Geographical Society, London, 1904
- Tsybikov, Gombozhab Tsebekovich. A Buddhist pilgrim to the holy places of Tibet, from diaries kept from 1899 to 1902, translated by Roger Shaw, 1970. The English translation has been done for 'Human Relations Area Files', 1956, 1961 (8 microfiches), by Roger Shaw.

=== In Russian ===
- Цыбиков Г. Ц. Избранные труды. Наука. Новосибирск 1981 г. (тираж 10.500 экз.); переиздание: Наука. Новосибирск 1991 г. Издательство: Наука. Новосибирск, 1991 г. ISBN 5-02-029626-0 Тираж: 26500 экз.
  1. т.1 Буддист-паломник у святынь Тибета.
  2. т.2 О Центральном Тибете; О монгольском переводе "Лам-рим чэн-по"; Цзонхава и его сочинение "Лам-рим чэн-по"; Материалы к русскому перевода "Лам-рим чэн-по"; Дневник поездки в Монголию в 1895 г.; Дневник поездки в Китай в 1909 г.; Дневник поездки в Ургу в 1927 г.; Забайкальское бурятское казачье войско; Культ огня у восточных бурят-монголов; Цагалган; Шаманизм у бурят-монголов; О национальных праздниках бурят; Монгольская письменность как орудие национальной культуры.
- Цыбиков Г. Ц. Буддист паломник у святынь Тибета. Издание Русского Географического Общества. Петроград, 1918 (1919).

== Literature ==
- Tolmacheva M., 'Tsybikov, Gombozhab', in Literature of Travel and Exploration: An Encyclopedia (ed. by Jennifer Speake). Taylor & Francis, 2003. ISBN 1-57958-440-3, ISBN 978-1-57958-440-5 – pp. 1199–1201
