= Peter Badmayev =

Russian doctor and political figure (c. 1850–1920)

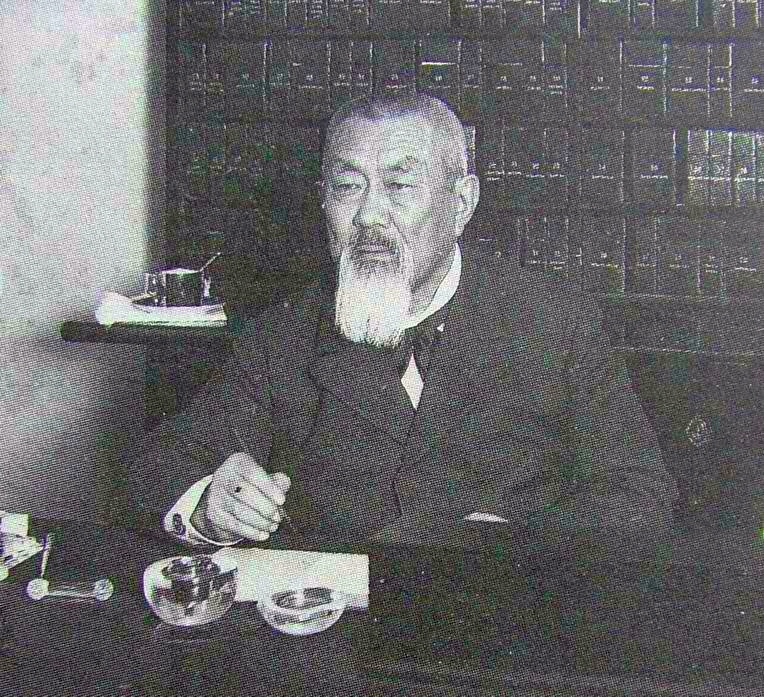
The Tibetan doctor Peter Badmayev

Pyotr Aleksandrovich Badmayev or Peter Badmayev, born Zhamsaran (Russian: Пётр Александрович Бадмаев: Pyotr Aleksandrovich Badmayev; Buryat: Бадмын Жамсаран; ca. 1850 – 29 July 1920), was a doctor and political figure in the Russian Empire. He was an ethnic Buryat from Buryatia. He played a large part in introducing Tibetan medicine to imperial Russia, and was also active in politics in the late 19th and early 20th century.

== Early life ==
Badmayev came from a Vajrayana Buddhist family, and his elder brother was Alexander Badmayev, a doctor of Tibetan medicine whose skills so impressed Alexander II that the tsar allowed him to practice in St. Petersburg. Peter converted to Orthodoxy after he became Alexander III’s godson and trained as an Orientalist and doctor. He served for many years in the Asia department of the Ministry of Foreign Affairs of the Russian Empire. He then worked as a physician from 1875 to the end of his life. The members of the royal family were among his patients.

Badmayev's older brother Sultim had a pharmacy in St. Petersburg; he invited his younger brother to the city after his graduation from the Russian Gymnasium in Irkutsk. In St. Petersburg, he studied at the Military Academy and the Oriental Faculty of St. Petersburg University, without graduating from either one. Instead, he began cutting a figure in the city's upper social classes. He married a wealthy woman, Nadezhda Vassilyevna around 1872 and set up a very successful clinic. Mysticism and the Tibetan worldview were all the rage in the upper reaches of Russian society at that time, and Badmayev translated the Tibetan Gyushi.

He served as an adviser on the Russian Foreign Ministry's Asian desk in 1873 and became a well-known figure in Russia's hand in the Great Game. He established a trading house in Chita as a cover for spies. He proposed arming the Mongols as a prelude for a Russian conquest of Mongolia, Tibet and China. His plan was not well received by Czar Alexander, but Badmayev persisted, visiting Mongolia and Tibet and peddling his ideas to various people of power in Russia, e.g., Prince Uhtomskii. He was appointed adviser on Tibetan affairs in 1894 after Nicholas II became Czar, in whom the Asia hawk found a more willing audience for his aspirations. Badmayev's designs received strong support from multiple successive war ministers and the Czar himself, ultimately leading to Russian advance into Manchuria in 1900.

Badmayev put out the first newspaper printed in Mongolian, a Russian-Mongolian affair called Light in the Far East in translation. He started a school at the end of the century. One of his pupils was Gombojab Tsybikov.

In 1912 the monk Iliodor hid in his house for one week. One of his patients was Alexander Protopopov, the last minister of interior before the fall of the Romanovs in 1917. According to Felix Yusupov, Grigori Rasputin is said to have given drugs to Tsarevich Alexei of Russia and his parents, supplied by Badmayev.

== Selected publications by Badmayev ==
- Badmayev, P. A. Answer to the Unfounded Assault of Members of the Medical Council Regarding Medical Science in Tibet [Russian]. 72 p., St. Petersburg 1911.
- Badmayev, P. A. "The Indo-Tibetan Medicine" [Russian]. Izvestiya [Moscow] issue 72, 24 March 1935.
- Badmayev, P. A. Über das System der medizinischen Wissenschaft Tibets. Aus dem Russischen übersetzt von Grigori Agalzew. 228 S. Privatdruck, Studiengruppe für tibetische Medizin, Padma AG, Zollikon/Schweiz 1994. [Russian original, 1898]
- Badmayev, Pyotr, 1898, O Sisteme Vrachebnoy Nauki Tibeta. Skoropechatiya "Nadezhda": St. Petersburg.

== Sources ==
- Gusev, Boris, 1995, Doktor Badmayev. Ruskaya kniga: Moscow.
- Gusev, Boris, 1995, Pyotr Badmayev . . .. OLMA-Press: Moscow.
