= Progressive Bloc (Russia) =

Legislative alliance during World War I

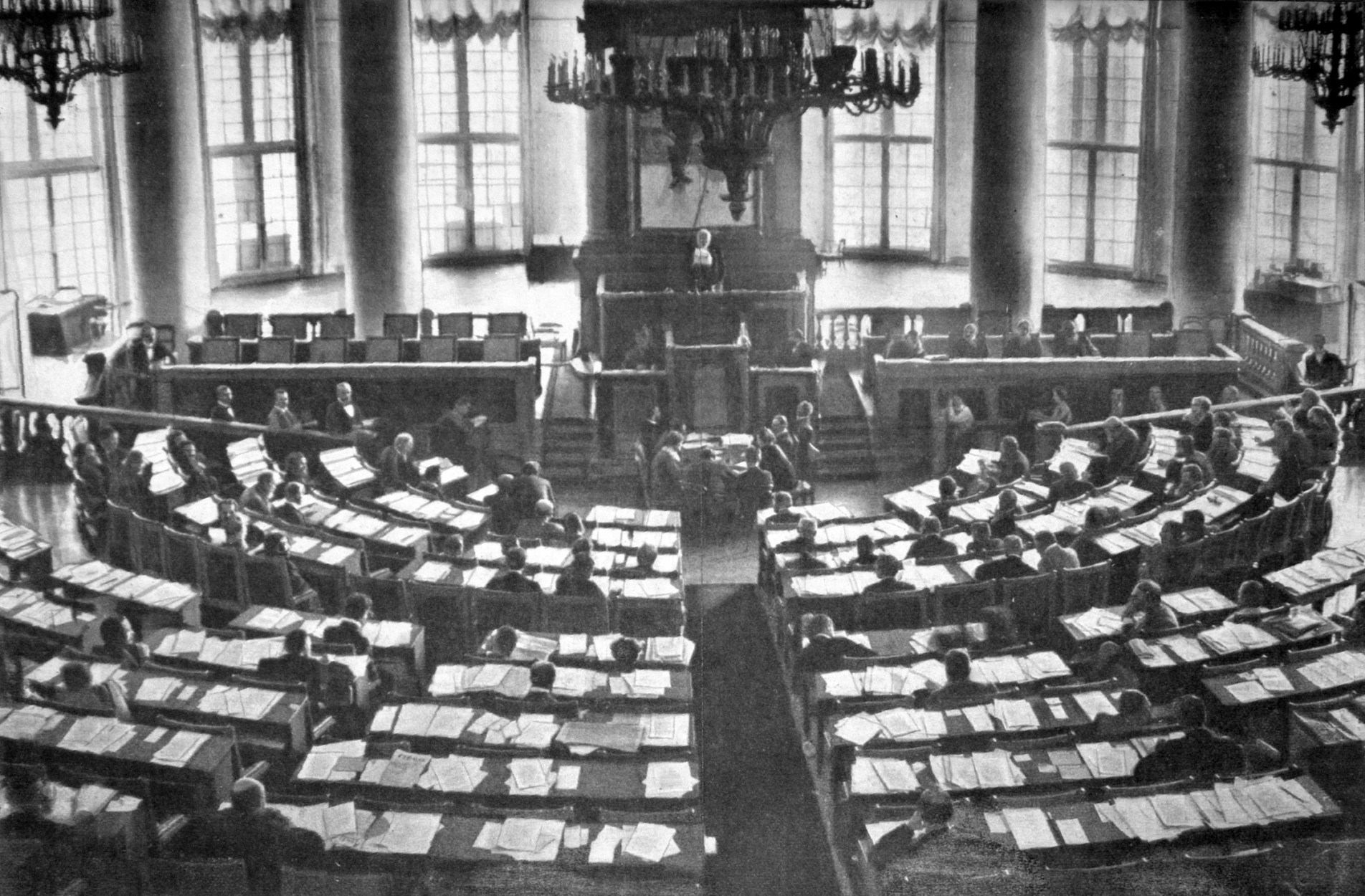
Hall of the sessions of the State Duma.

The Progressive Bloc was an alliance of political forces in the Russian Empire in the early twentieth century. It held 236 of the 442 seats in the Imperial Duma.

== History ==
The Bloc was formed when the Duma was recalled to session during World War I, one response of Nicholas II of Russia to mounting social tensions. On the instigation of Pavel Milyukov, the Progressist Party combined with the Kadet Party, left Octobrists, and progressive nationalists and individual politicians such as Vasily Shulgin to form a political front in the Duma that called for a "government of confidence". According to the Bolsheviks, the political front supported a social-chauvinist stance on the continuation of World War I.

The program content was determined by the desire to find common ground for an agreement with the government on the basis of a minimum of liberal reforms.

The Progressive Bloc's program included demands for political and religious amnesty, the abolition of restrictions on nationalities and faiths (Poles, Jews, etc.), and the freedom of trade unions. The Bloc's main demand was the formation of a "ministry of confidence". A meeting took place on 9 September 1915 between the Bloc's representatives and ministers, where the deputies not only demanded the fulfillment of the Bloc's program, but also the resignation of the ministers themselves. The negotiations resulted in the government advocating for the Duma's suspension, which took place on 16 September 1915."

The Imperial Duma was sent into recess by the Tsar and did not reconvene again until February 1916.

By the beginning of 1916, Alexei Khvostov came to a compromise with the Progressive Bloc. The Duma gathered on 9 February after the 76-year-old Ivan Goremykin, opposed to the convening of the Duma, had been dismissed and replaced by Boris Stürmer as prime minister. However, the deputies were disappointed by Stürmer's speech. Because of the war, he said, it was not the time for constitutional reforms. For the first time in his life, the Tsar made a visit to the Taurida Palace.

In October 1916, the opposition parties decided to attack Stürmer, his government and the "Dark forces". For the Octobrists and the Kadets, the liberals in the parliament, Grigori Rasputin, who believed in autocracy and absolute monarchy, was one of the main obstacles. On 1 November (O.S.) the Stürmer government was attacked by Milyukov. The Progressist Party left the Bloc after demanding a responsible government.

Stürmer and Alexander Protopopov (his unexpected appointment was seen as a provocation designed to split the Bloc) asked in vain for the dissolution of the Duma. Alexander Guchkov reported that five members of the Progressive Bloc, including Alexander Kerensky, Aleksandr Konovalov, Nikolai Vissarionovich Nekrasov and Mikhail Tereschenko would consider a coup d'etat, but did not proceed. Grand Duke Nikolai refused to cooperate, saying that the army would not support a coup. The Progressive Bloc supported a resolution that the Tsar was to be replaced by his son Alexei Nikolaevich. The new prime minister Alexander Trepov offered to satisfy some of the Bloc's demands.

In the lead-up to the February Revolution of 1917, the Bloc played a crucial role in the uprising's success through the suggestion to Tsar Nicholas II that he should establish a "government of public confidence". The Tsar instead made little attempt to make political reform or become a constitutional monarch that could have saved the Romanov dynasty.
