= Alexander Trepov =

Prime Minister of the Russian Empire in 1916

- Александр Трепов
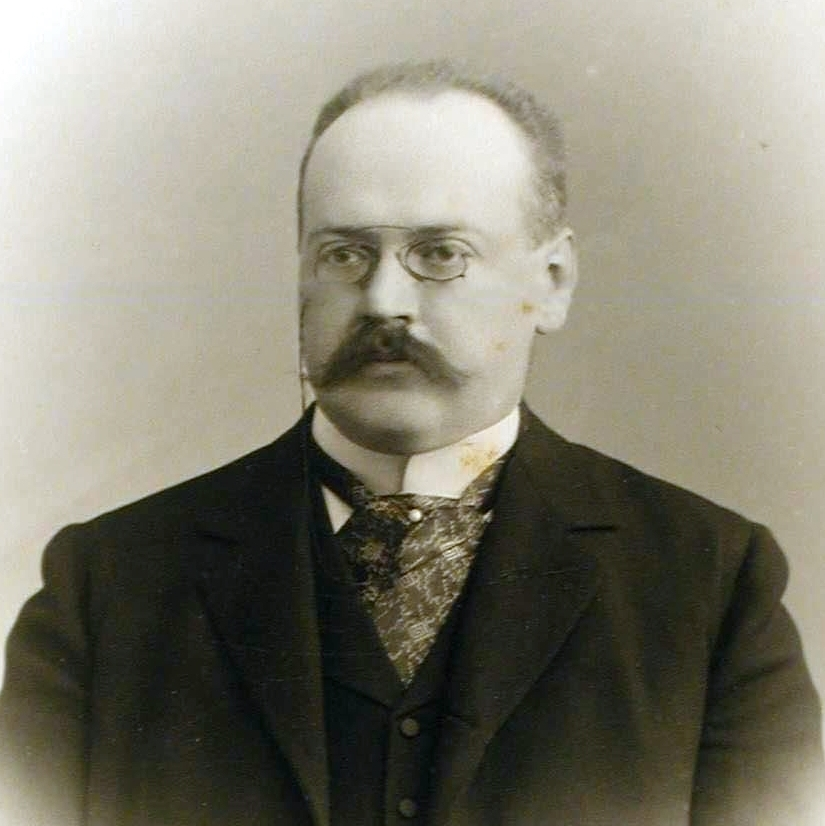
- Trepov in 1897

Prime Minister of Russia
- In office 23 November 1916 – 9 January 1917
- Monarch: Nicholas II
- Preceded by: Boris Stürmer
- Succeeded by: Nikolai Golitsyn

Minister of Transport of Russia
- In office 12 November 1915 – 9 January 1917
- Prime Minister: Boris Stürmer; Himself
- Preceded by: Sergei Rukhlov
- Succeeded by: Eduard Kriger-Voinovsky

Personal details
- Born: 30 September 1862 Kiev, Kiev Governorate, Russian Empire
- Died: 10 November 1928 (aged 66) Nice, France
- Parent: Fyodor Trepov (father)
- Education: Page Corps

Alexander Fyodorovich Trepov (Russian: Александр Фёдорович Трепов; Ukrainian: Олександр Федорович Трепов; 30 September 1862 – 10 November 1928) was the Prime Minister of the Russian Empire from 23 November 1916 until 9 January 1917. He was conservative, a monarchist, a member of the Russian Assembly, and an advocate of moderate reforms opposed to the influence of Grigori Rasputin.

== Biography ==
=== Early life ===
Alexander was the youngest of the four sons of general Fyodor Trepov, who was involved in the suppression of the January Uprising in 1864 and between 1873 and 1878 served as Governor of St Petersburg. All of his three brothers held senior positions during the reign of Nicholas II. According to MP-nationalist AI Savenko, Alexander was "the most intelligent of the brothers, capable, very determined, with lots of character".

Alexander was educated in His Majesty's Page Corps. He worked in the Ministry of the Interior (1889–1892), was elected Marshal of Nobility of Pereiaslavl Uezd (1892–1895), and assistant State Secretary (1899).

Alexander was appointed as a member of the special commission to draft a plan for a State Duma, according to the rescript of February 18, 1905, and the Manifesto of October 17.

He was the brother of General Dmitri Feodorovich Trepov, who during the Revolution of 1905/1906 served as deputy minister of the interior, played a major role in the repression of unrest and was described as the real ruler of the country.

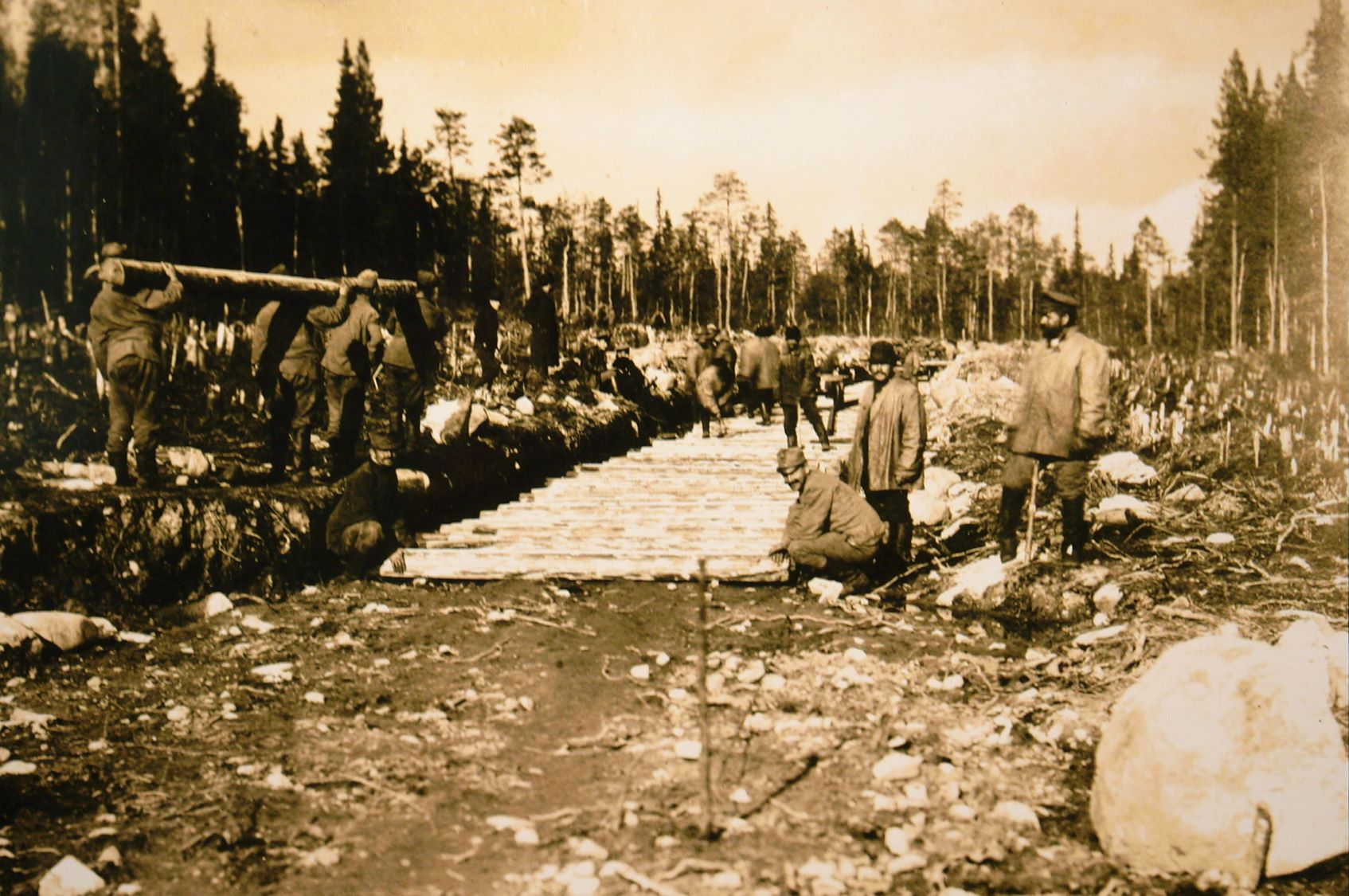
POWs constructing the Kirov Railway (1916)

Trepov became senator in the Governing Senate in 1906. In an unknown year he was sent abroad to study the parliamentary systems of Western Europe. In 1914 he was appointed in the State Council. Trepov was appointed Minister of Transport, Railways and Communication on November 12 (30 October O.S.), 1915, and Grigori Rasputin was grieved. He developed the Kirov Railway, constructed with a number of war prisoners, to improve the transport connections between the ice-free port of Murmansk with the Eastern Front during World War I. The food problem in the big cities was a difficult issue. Aleksandr Naumov suggested to create a special meeting of five Ministers on Military, Internal Affairs, Communications, Agriculture, and Finance. It was headed by Trepov. On 1 January 1916 Trepov became minister of Transport under Ivan Goremykin, who was succeeded shortly after by Boris Stürmer. Trepov had secretly designed a plan of railway construction and introduced it in government. Trepov quickly established himself in office and showed that his ambition went further. Having proven himself to be a competent organizer, Trepov was now willing to become the next prime minister. According to Naumov, Trepov was one of the most temperamental and talkative members of the Council of Ministers, dealing with an almost dictatorial Stürmer as Prime Minister, Interior Minister and Foreign Minister.

=== Prime minister ===
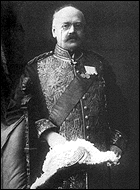
Alexander Fyodorovitch Trepov in 1916

On 8 November Boris Stürmer (pro-peace) was dismissed as prime minister/minister of foreign affairs, to the rejoicing of the Duma. On 9 November Empress Alexandra proposed to appoint Ivan Shcheglovitov to Foreign Affairs, but he seemed to be unacceptable. On 10 November 1916 the bellicose Trepov was appointed new prime minister, promising to promote a parliamentary system, but keeping his position of transport minister. Trepov's declaration contained promises to urgently reform the municipal government, to enter the rural municipality district council and to remove national and religious restrictions to education. Because of the shortage in food in the big cities Aleksei Aleksandrovich Bobrinsky, the minister of agriculture had to give up his post; he was succeeded by Aleksandr Aleksandrovich Rittikh. On 17 November Nikolai Pokrovsky was appointed to the ministry of foreign affairs. According to Orlando Figes it was the Russian liberals final opportunity to 'make their peace' with the government.

Trepov was a new, 'modern day Stolypin', and was determined to win over the more moderate Duma politicians by making concessions; Pavel Milyukov and Alexander Guchkov were ready to accept his gesture (and possibly a position in his cabinet), but the more radical and socialist Duma members remained determined to bring down the government.

Trepov was supposed to achieve the resignation of four of the most unpopular ministers. On 16 November Trepov informed Alexander Protopopov that he wished him to give up his position in the Ministry of the Interior and take over that of Trade and Industry, but Protopopov refused. Trepov had made the dismissal of Protopopov an indispensable condition of his accepting the presidency of the council, Protopopov being a 'protege of Rasputin'. and supposedly having mental problems. On 19 November Trepov declared full transfer of the food issue at the request of the Duma to the ministry of agriculture.

On 27 November both Protopopov and Alexandra travelled to Stavka. Trepov threatened to resign on the next day. On 29 November/12 December the German Chancellor, Theobald von Bethmann Hollweg, in a speech in the Reichstag, offered to open negotiations with the Entente in a neutral country. On 2 December, on his appearance in the Imperial Duma, Trepov revealed France and Britain promised Russia Constantinople and the Bosporus, but was loudly hissed at by the Socialists. The deputies shouted "down with the Ministers! Down with Protopopov!". Pokrovsky said that Russia would never sign a peace treaty with the Central Powers, which caused a storm of applause. On 7 December the cabinet demanded that Protopopov should go to the emperor and resign, but at the request of the Tsar, his wife, Anna Vyrubova and Rasputin combined the pro-peace Protopopov stayed in his job.

=== Rasputin ===
Trepov having failed to eliminate Protopopov tried to bribe Rasputin. With the help of general A.A. Mosolov, his brother-in-law, Trepov offered a substantial amount of money, a bodyguard and a house to Rasputin, when he would leave politics. Trepov had offered Rasputin 200,000 roubles in cash to return to Siberia and never again involve himself in politics. Rasputin refused the offer and informed Alexandra. The tsar received Trepov on Monday the 12th Dec. On 13 December Rasputin warned against the influence of Trepov. Alexandra reacted with a letter to her husband against Trepov. She hated Trepov and Makarov; the tsarina even wanted Trepov hanged. Fighting the war against Germany had to go on. Woodrow Wilson planned to bring the United States into the war, when the Germans attempted to negotiate peace with the allies. As a result, and in short Alexandra's and Rasputin's standing and prestige in society fell, and led to the final determined conspiracy by Prince Felix Yusupov, and Grand Dukes Grand Duke Dmitry Pavlovich and Grand Duke Nikolai Mikhailovich to have him murdered in the hope stopping Alexandra's interference in politics.

=== Post-Premier ===
On 16 December 1916 the Imperial Duma was closed for Christmas until 28 December (which is 29 December until January 9, 1917 N.S.). On 17 December Rasputin was murdered. On 29 December a hesitating prince Nikolai Golitsyn became the successor of Trepov, who was dismissed on the 27th. Also Pavel Ignatieff, Alexander Makarov and Dmitry Shuvayev were replaced.

In the seventeen months of the `Tsarina's rule', from September 1915 to February 1917, Russia had four Prime Ministers, five Ministers of the Interior, three Foreign Ministers, three War Ministers, two Ministers of Transport and four Ministers of Agriculture. This "ministerial leapfrog", as it came to be known, not only removed competent men from power, but also disorganized the work of government since no one remained long enough in office to master their responsibilities.

According to Bernard Pares Trepov was probably appointed as a curator at the Tsarskoye Selo Lyceum, where he met the tsar on February 1, 1917.

After the October Revolution he was arrested by the Cheka. Trepov collaborated with Count Paul von Benckendorff to protect the imperial family. From autumn 1918 to January 1919 he led in Helsinki the "Special Committee for Russian in Finland". In the 1920s Trepov emigrated to France, from where he supported the White Army. He became president of the "Union des Organisations monarchiques russes". In 1921 he and his brother-in-law Alexander Mosolov participated in the "Congrès monarchiste russe", organized in Bad Reichenhall.

He died in 1928 and was buried at the Russian Orthodox Cemetery, Nice.

== Bibliography ==
- Figes, Orlando (2014). A People's Tragedy: The Russian Revolution 1891–1924. London: The Bodley Head. ISBN 9781847922915.
- The PENULTIMATE PRIME Minister of the RUSSIAN EMPIRE A. F. TREPOV by FEDOR ALEKSANDROVICH GAIDA (2012)
- Gurko, Vladimir I. (1939). Features And Figures Of The Past Covernment And Opinion In The Reign Of Nicholas II. New York: Russell & Russell.
- Massie, Robert K. (2013). Nicholas and Alexandra: The Tragic, Compelling Story of the Last Tsar and his Family. Head of Zeus. ISBN 9781781850565.
- Mosolov, Aleksandr (1935). At the court of the last tsar: being the memoirs of A. A. Mossolov, head of the court chancellery, 1900-1916. Methuen. ISBN 978-0-598-66681-9.
- Pares, Bernard. The Fall of the Russian Monarchy
- Pipes, Richard (1991). The Russian Revolution. New York: Vintage Books. ISBN 9780307788573.
- Radzinsky, Edvard (2010). The Rasputin File. Knopf Doubleday Publishing Group.
- Seeger, Charles Louis (1921). Recollections Of A Foreign Minister. Doubleday Page & Company.
- Spargo, John (1919). Bolshevism: The Enemy of Political and Industrial Democracy. Elamedia Group LLC. ISBN 9781449550752.
- Walsh S.J., Edmund A. (2009). The Fall of the Russian Empire: The Story of the Last of the Romanovs and the Coming of the Bolshevik. Wildside Press LLC.

=== Other ===
- An obituary can be found in The Times, Monday, Nov 12, 1928; p. 18 (using the old transliteration Trepoff).

Political offices
Preceded by Boris Stürmer	Prime Minister of Russia; 23 November [O.S. 10 November] 1916 – 9 January 1917 [O.S. 27 December 1916]	Succeeded by Nikolai Golitsyn
Preceded by Sergei Rukhlov	Minister of Transport; 12 November [O.S. 30 October] 1915 – 9 January 1917 [O.S. 27 December 1916]	Succeeded by Eduard Kriger-Voinovsky
