= Evgeny Khvostov =

Russian ice hockey player

- Born: May 28, 1981 (age 43); Surgut, Russian SFSR
- Height: 5 ft 10 in (178 cm)
- Weight: 187 lb (85 kg; 13 st 5 lb)
- Position: Defence
- Shot: Left
- Played for: HC Yugra
- Playing career: 1999–2016

Evgeny Khvostov (born May 28, 1981) is a Russian former professional ice hockey defenceman who most notably played for HC Yugra of the Kontinental Hockey League (KHL). After retiring from 17 seasons professionally, Khvostov remained with Yugra, as an assistant coach with their MHL club, before moving to the same role in KHL until he was released on September 29, 2017.
