= Historical structures of Governments of the Russian Federation =

The structure of Government of the Russian Federation from the time the state formed in 1991 underwent several major changes. In the first years governing bodies, primarily different Ministries, were under massive reorganizations in order to adopt the older Soviet governing networks to the new form of state. Many reshufflings and renamings were made.

In July 2004 there was a major reform of the government when some ministries were split and some ministerial offices turned into agencies, some new services were established as government bodies. Resulting in 17 Ministries, 7 Federal Services and over 30 Federal Agencies.

In May 2008, after inaugurating of Dmitry Medvedev as president and Vladimir Putin becoming prime minister, another major reshuffling was made with several ministries being renamed, and agencies re-subordinated.

E. g. the Soviet-time "Ministry of communications of the RSFSR" was through 1990s transformed to "Ministry for communications and informatization" and in 2004 it was renamed to "Ministry of information technologies and communications (Mininformsvyazi)", and in 2008 – "Ministry of connections and mass communications (Minkomsvyaz)".

The "Ministry of press and information of the RSFSR" was in 1990s renamed to "Ministry of Press, Broadcasting and Mass Communications (Minpechati)" and in 2004 it was turned into the "Federal Agency on Press and Mass Communications (Rospechat)" which was no longer a standalone ministry but a subdivision to the "Ministry of Culture and Mass Communications" (originally "Ministry of culture of the RSFSR"). In 2008 it was re-subordinated back to "Minvsyazi".

== Structure development ==
=== 1991 ===
On 28 November 1991 the President of the RSFSR Boris Yeltsin signed the Presidential Decree No. 242 "On reorganization of the government bodies of the RSFSR" (Russian: "О реорганизации центральных органов государственного управления РСФСР"). This ukaz established structure of the Government of the RSFSR, included following structures:

- Ministry of architecture, construction and housing and communal services of the RSFSR
- Ministry of public health of the RSFSR
- Ministry of foreign affairs of the RSFSR
- Ministry of culture of the RSFSR
- Ministry of science, high school and technical policy of the RSFSR
- Ministry of education of the RSFSR
- Ministry of press and information of the RSFSR
- Ministry of industry of the RSFSR
- Ministry of communications of the RSFSR
- Ministry of agriculture of the RSFSR
- Ministry of social protection of the RSFSR
- Ministry of fuel and energy of the RSFSR
- Ministry of trade and material resources of the RSFSR
- Ministry of transport of the RSFSR
- Ministry of labor and employment of the RSFSR
- Ministry of ecology and natural resources of the RSFSR
- Ministry of economics and finances of the RSFSR
- Ministry of justice of the RSFSR
- State committee of the RSFSR for antimonopoly policy and supporting of new structures
- State committee of the RSFSR for national policy
- State committee of the RSFSR for defense
- State committee of the RSFSR for social protection for victims of Chernobyl and other radiation disasters
- State committee of the RSFSR for social and economical development of the North
- State committee of the RSFSR for management the federal property
- State tax committee of the RSFSR
- State Customs committee of the RSFSR
- Head direction of the special construction of the RSFSR
- Committee for the archives of the Government of the RSFSR
- Committee for state reserves of the RSFSR
- Committee for assistance to the Olympic movement in the RSFSR
- Head direction for staff training for the Government of the RSFSR

=== 2004 ===
The structure of the Government according to 2004 Administrative Reform was set up in President's ukaz of 28 July 2004 (with later corrections) "About structure of the federal executive bodies".

I. The federal ministries, federal services and federal agencies, management of which activity is carried out by the President of the Russian Federation, federal services and federal agencies subordinated to these federal ministries

Ministry of interior of the Russian Federation – Arabic, English, German, Russian

Federal migratory service

Ministry of the Russian Federation for the affairs of civil defence, extraordinary situations and disaster relief – English, Russian

Ministry of foreign affairs of the Russian Federation – English, Russian

Ministry of defence of the Russian Federation – English, Russian

Federal service of military-technical cooperation – English, Russian
Federal service of defensive procurement – Russian
Federal service of technical and export control
Federal agency of special construction – Russian

Ministry of justice of the Russian Federation – English, Russian

Federal service of execution of punishments
Federal registration service
Federal service of court bailiffs
Federal agency of a cadastre of the real estate – Russian

State special cerier service of the Russian Federation

Foreign intelligence service of the Russian Federation – Russian

Federal security service of the Russian Federation – Russian

Federal service of the Russian Federation on the control over a turnover of narcotics – Russian

Federal protective service of the Russian Federation – Russian

Chief directorate of special programs of the President of the Russian Federation – Russian

Directorate of the President of the Russian Federation – Russian

II. The Federal ministries, management with which is carried out by the Government of the Russian Federation, federal services and the federal agencies subordinated to these federal ministries

Ministry of health and social development of the Russian Federation – Russian

Federal service of supervision in sphere of protection of the rights of consumers and well-being of the person – Russian
Federal service of supervision in sphere of public health services and social development
Federal service of work and employment
Federal agency of public health services and social development
Federal medical and biologic agency
Federal agency of hi-tech medical aid

Ministry of informational technologies and communications of the Russian Federation – Russian

Federal agency on informational technologies
Federal agency of communication

Ministry of culture and mass communications of the Russian Federation – Russian

Federal archival agency – Russian
Federal agency on culture and cinematographics – Russian
Federal agency on a press and mass communications

Ministry of education and sciences of the Russian Federation – English, Russian

Federal service of intellectual property, patents and trade marks
Federal service of supervision in sphere of education and a science
Federal agency of a science and innovations
Federal agency of education – Russian

Ministry of natural resources of the Russian Federation – Russian

Federal service of supervision in sphere of wildlife management
Federal agency of water resources
Federal agency of forestry
Federal agency of use of mineral resources

Ministry of the industry and energy of the Russian Federation – Russian

Federal agency on industry – Russian
Federal agency of technical regulation and metrology
Federal agency of energy

Ministry of regional development of the Russian Federation – Russian

Federal agency of construction, housing and housing services – Russian

Ministry of agriculture of the Russian Federation – Russian

Federal service of veterinary and fytosanitory supervision

Ministry of transport of the Russian Federation – Russian

Federal service of supervision in sphere of transport
Federal agency of air transport
Federal agency of a geodesy and cartography – Russian
Federal road agency
Federal agency of a railway transportation
Federal agency of sea and river transport

Ministry of finance of the Russian Federation – Russian

Federal tax service
Federal service of insurance supervision
Federal service of financial-budgetary supervision
Federal treasury – Russian

The ministry of economic development and trade of the Russian Federation – Russian

Federal agency of the state reserves
Federal agency of management of federal property
Federal agency of management of special economic zones – Russian

III. Federal services and federal agencies, a management of with which are carried out by the Government of the Russian Federation

State committee of the Russian Federation on fishery

Federal antimonopoly service – Russian

Federal aeronavigation service

Federal service of hydrometeorology and monitoring of an environment – Russian

Federal service of the state statistics – Russian

Federal service of supervision in sphere of mass communications, communication and protection of a cultural heritage – Russian

Federal customs service

Federal service of tariffs – Russian

Federal service of financial monitoring

Federal service of the financial markets – Russian

Federal service of ecological, technological and nuclear supervision – Russian

Federal agency of atomic energy

Federal space agency – Russian

Federal agency of deliveries of arms, of military and special equipment, and of material means

Federal agency of tourism

Federal agency of physical culture and sports

=== 2007 ===
Viktor Zubkov made a slight reshufflement in September 2007.

=== 2008 ===
In May 2008, after inaugurating of Dmitry Medvedev as president and Vladimir Putin becoming prime minister, another major reshuffling was made with several ministries being renamed, and agencies re-subordinated.
