= Aleksandr Naumov =

Russian politician (1868–1950)

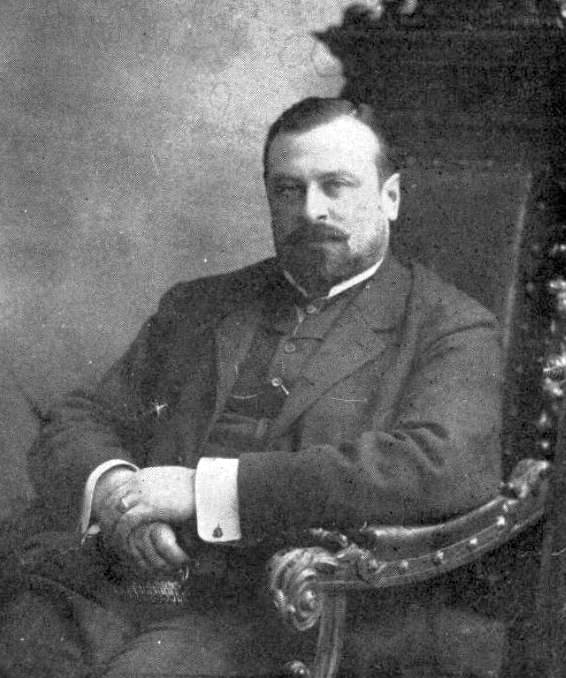
A.N. Naumov

Aleksandr Nikolaevich Naumov (Russian: Алекса́ндр Никола́евич Нау́мов; 1868 in Simbirsk – 1950 in Nice) was a Russian politician.

== Life ==
Naumov, a graduate of Moscow University, was a land captain in Samara Governorate from 1893 to 1897, a member of the Zemstvo Assembly of Stavropol Uezd in Samara Governorate from 1894 to 1897, and, from 1897 to 1902, the Chairman of the Zemstvo Board of Samara Governorate. The Tsar bestowed on him the title of Marshal of Nobility of Stavropol Uezd in 1902, and of Samara in 1905. Naumov was the publisher of the periodical Golos Samary; he was elected a member of the Russian State Council in 1909, 1912, and 1915 and again in 1916. He served as the Russian Minister of Agriculture during 1915 and 1916, then fled in the wake of the October Revolution.

Preceded by Alexander Krivoshein	Minister of agriculture of Russia; November 1915 – July 1916	Succeeded by Alexei Bobrinsky
