= Aleksandr Aleksandrovich Makarov =

Russian politician

Alexander Makarov
- Александр Макаров
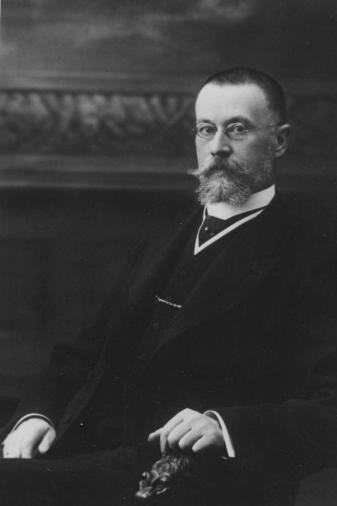
- Makarov in 1916

Minister of Justice
- In office 7 July 1916 – 20 December 1916
- Monarch: Nicholas II
- Prime Minister: Boris Stürmer; Alexander Trepov
- Preceded by: Aleksandr Khvostov
- Succeeded by: Nikolai Dobrovolsky

Minister of Interior
- In office 20 September 1911 – 16 December 1912
- Monarch: Nicholas II
- Prime Minister: Vladimir Kokovtsov
- Preceded by: Pyotr Stolypin
- Succeeded by: Nikolay Maklakov

Personal details
- Born: July 19, 1857 St. Petersburg, Russian Empire
- Died: February 1919 Moscow, Russian SFSR
- Education: St. Petersburg University (1878)

Aleksandr Aleksandrovich Makarov (Russian: Алекса́ндр Алекса́ндрович Мака́ров; 19 July [O.S. 7 July] 1857 – 1919) was a Russian politician who served as the interior minister of the Russian Empire from 1911 to 1912 and as justice minister in 1916.

== Life ==
After graduating from the University of Saint Petersburg, he entered the Ministry of Justice. He rose to the position of Public Prosecutor, and eventually Chairman of a District Court. In 1906, he was appointed Chairman of the Kharkov Court of Appeals. In 1906, he was appointed Assistant Minister of the Interior in charge of the Police under Stolypin until he was appointed Imperial Secretary in 1909. He was appointed Minister of the Interior in 1911 after Stolypin's assassination on the recommendation of Kokovstsov. He left the position of Minister in December 1912 after the Lena Minefields incident and disagreements over regulation of the press about a sexual connection between Grigori Rasputin and the Tsarina.

Makarov received an appointment to the State Council where he was aligned with the political right wing parties. He was appointed Minister of Justice in July 1916, against the wish of Alexandra and Rasputin, but there was a lack of competent men. He lost the post in December after hindering the investigation into the assassination of Rasputin since he had given Felix Yusupov, a participant in Rasputin's assassination, permission to leave the city.

After the February Revolution he was arrested on March 1, 1917, released and re-arrested in October 1917. He was executed by the Cheka in a Moscow prison in 1919.

== Sources ==
- Out of My Past: The Memoirs of Count Kokovtsov Edited by H.H. Fisher and translated by Laura Matveev; Stanford University Press, 1935.
- The Memoirs of Count Witte Edited and translated by Sydney Harcave; Sharpe Press, 1990.
- Margarita Nelipa (2010) The Murder of Grigorii Rasputin. A Conspiracy That Brought Down the Russian Empire, Gilbert's Books. ISBN 978-0-9865310-1-9.

Political offices
Preceded by Pyotr Stolypin	Minister of Interior; 20 September 1911 – 16 December 1912	Succeeded by Nikolai Maklakov
Preceded by Aleksandr Khvostov	Minister of Justice; 7 July 1916 – 20 December 1916 (O.S.)	Succeeded by Nikolai Dobrovolsky
