= Varvara Panina =

Russian singer (1872–1911)

Varvara Vasilyevna Panina
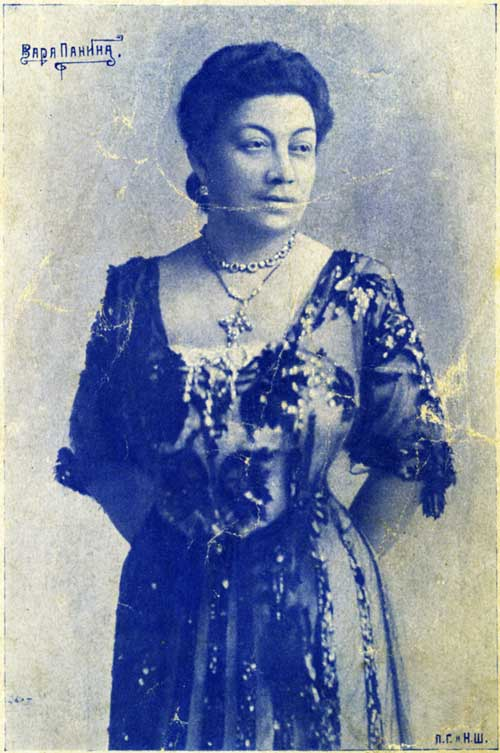
- Born: Varvara Vasilyevna Vasilyeva; 1872; Moscow, Russian Empire
- Died: June 10, 1911 (aged 38–39); Moscow, Russian Empire
- Occupation: singer
- Years active: 1884–1910
- Varvara Panina's songs recorded 1905–1910

Varvara Vasilyevna Panina (Russian: Варва′ра Васи′льевна Па′нина; 1872 – June 10 [O.S. May 28], 1911) was a Russian singer of Romani origins, famous for her deep contralto, one of the Russian popular music stars of the early 20th century.

== Biography ==
Varvara Vasilyeva (her birth name) was born to the family of Gypsy horse traders, based in Moscow. She started singing at the age of 14, first in the Gypsy choir directed by Alexandra Panina, at the Strelna restaurant. Having married Panina's nephew Fyodor Artemyevich Panin, she moved to the Moscow Yar restaurant, famous for its Gypsy concerts. In 1902 Varya Panina debuted on stage at the Saint Petersburg's Dvoryanskoye Sobranye (The Gentry Assembly) and had her first success. Since then she performed only on stage, giving solo concerts, performing Gypsy songs and Russian romances to rapturous response. Among her fans were poet Alexander Blok, writers Leo Tolstoy, Alexander Kuprin, Anton Chekhov, painter Konstantin Korovin and members of the Russian Royal family. Panina made numerous recordings of which more than 50 remain. She died of a heart attack on May 28, 1911, and was buried at the Vagankovo cemetery.
