= Nikolai Pokrovsky =

Russian politician (1865–1930)

- Николай Покровский
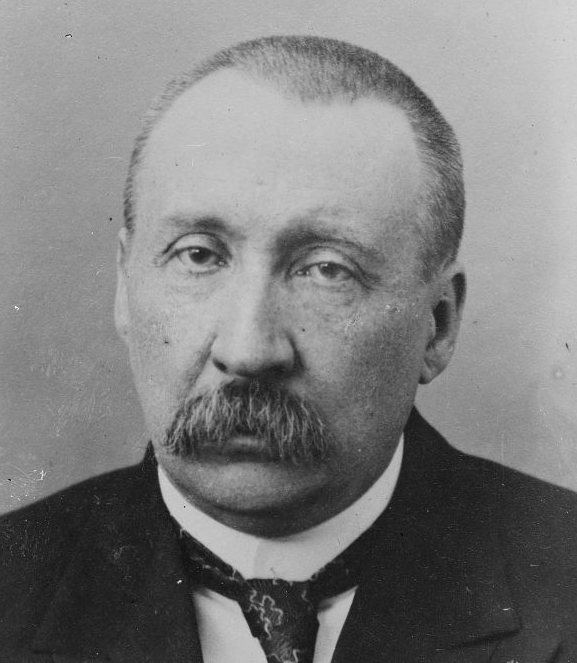
- Nikolai Pokrovsky

Foreign Minister of the Russian Empire
- In office 14 December 1916 – 2 March 1917
- Monarch: Nicholas II
- Preceded by: Boris Stürmer
- Succeeded by: Pavel Milyukov ( as Foreign Minister of the Russian Republic)

Personal details
- Born: 27 January 1865 Saint Petersburg, Russian Empire
- Died: 12 December 1930 (aged 65) Kaunas, Lithuania
- Education: Imperial Moscow University; Saint Petersburg University
- Profession: Diplomat, Russian foreign minister, teacher

Nikolai Nikolaevich Pokrovsky (Russian: Николай Николаевич Покровский) (27 January 1865 – 12 December 1930) was a nationalist Russian politician and the last foreign minister of the Russian Empire.

== Life ==
Pokrovsky was born in St Petersburg. He attended the law schools of the Imperial Moscow University and St Petersburg University. In 1889, he began his career at the Ministry of Finance. In 1902-1903, Pokrovsky was a deputy chairman (chairman from 1904) of the Department of Taxation of the Ministry of Finance. In 1906, he was appointed deputy finance minister and mainly oversaw taxation affairs. In 1914-1916, Pokrovsky was a member of the State Council (retaining his post of the deputy finance minister until July 1914). From January to December 1916, Pokrovsky held the post of state inspector.

=== Minister of Foreign Affairs ===
On 14 December 1916 (N.S), he was appointed minister of foreign affairs. He succeeded Boris Stürmer, in favour of a peace treaty with Germany, and took over the office from Stürmer's deputy Anatoly Neratov. Some of the English newspapers regarded his nomination as a sign of final suppression of Germanophilic agitation in Russia; a defeat for Rasputin and his friends. On his first speech in the Duma on 2 December Pokrovsky announced in the Imperial Duma that the Constantinople Agreement of 1915 with Great Britain and France (later signed by Italy, as well) had finally established Russia’s right on the straits and Constantinople. On 12 December the German Chancellor, Theobald von Bethmann Hollweg, in a speech in the Reichstag, offered to open negotiations with the Entente in a neutral country. On 15 December Pokrovsky said that Russia would never sign a peace treaty with the Central Powers, which caused a storm of applause in the Duma.

Pokrovsky favored the attraction of the American financial capital into the Russian economy. With the support of the Ministry of Finance, he proposed to send a special commission on economic and financial affairs to the United States. In January 1917, Pokrovsky prepared a document, in which he defended the idea of establishing close ties with the US in light of this country’s potentially decisive role in ending the war. In his note to the tsar from 21 February Pokrovsky expressed his confidence in victory over Germany and inquired about a possibility to prepare an expeditionary force for deployment in Constantinople by October 1917. During a session of the Council of Ministers on 25 February 1917, Pokrovsky proposed the resignation of the whole government. He was sent to negotiate this matter with the Duma and Progressive Bloc. On 26 February Pokrovsky reported about his negotiations with the Bloc (led by Vasili Maklakov) at the session of the Council of Ministers in the Mariinsky Palace. The Bloc spoke for the resignation of the government.

After the February Revolution, Pokrovsky headed the Russo-American Committee on Assistance to the Economic Rapprochement between Russia and the US. After the October Revolution, Pokrovsky emigrated from Russia and taught at the Vytautas Magnus University in Kaunas, Lithuania, where he died in 1930.

Political offices
Preceded by Boris Stürmer	Foreign Minister of Russia; 1 December 1916 (O.S.) – 2 March 1917 (O.S.)	Succeeded by Pavel Miliukov
