= Alexei Khvostov =

Russian politician (1872–1918)

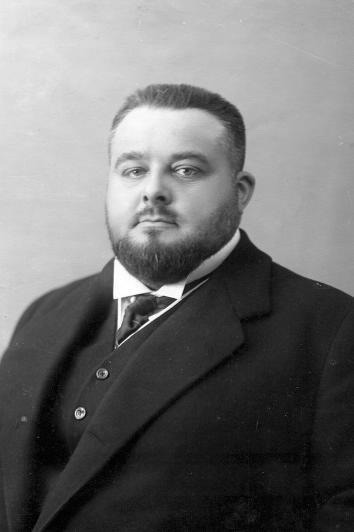
Aleksey Khvostov (1913)

Aleksey Nikolayevich Khvostov (Russian: Алексе́й Никола́евич Хвосто́в, IPA: [xvɐˈstof]) (1 July 1872 – 23 August 1918) was a right-wing Russian politician and the leader of the Russian Assembly. He was a governor, a Privy Councillor (Russia), a chamberlain, a member of the Black Hundreds, and anti-German. He supported the Union of the Russian People. He was Minister of Interior for five months, opposed constitutional reforms and publicly accused Rasputin of spying for Germany.

== Life ==
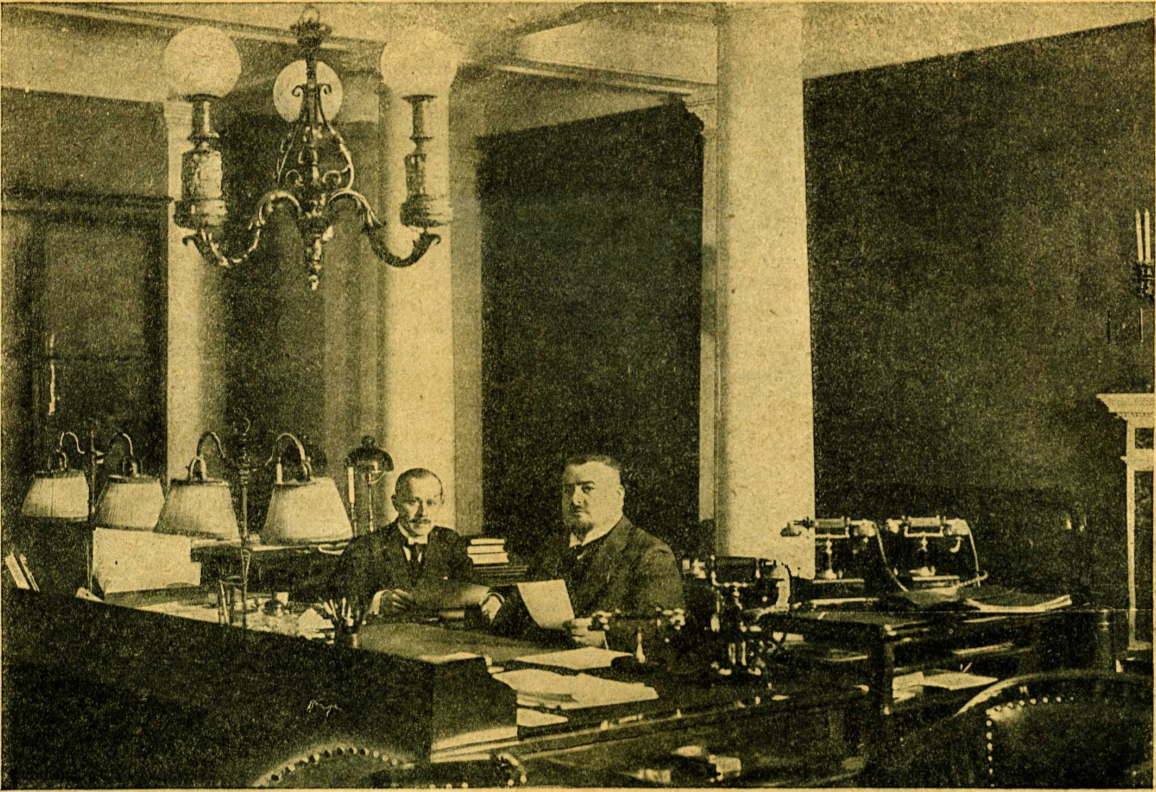
Khvostov in his office as Minister of Interior

Khvostov was born in a noble family of land proprietors. After finishing the Imperial Alexander Lyceum in Tsarskoye Selo, he became a student in Law. In 1898 he married Ekaterina Popova, the daughter of Alexander Popov (1835-1914), a senator. In 1904 he became vice governor of Minsk and later that year was appointed to Tula. In 1906 Khvostov became Vice Governor and then Governor of Nizhny Novgorod. When Pyotr Stolypin was murdered, Grigori Rasputin paid him a visit by order of the Tsar "to look in his soul", but came to the conclusion he was too young to be appointed as minister. Also Count Kokovtsov had opposed the appointment.

In 1906 it is believed that Khvostov participated in a massacre of peasants in the province of Chernihiv after they stole grain from a landowner as a result of the issuing of the Russian Constitution of 1906. This caused the Socialist-Revolutionists' Party to call for his assassination, a task that was placed upon Mariya Shkolnik and a comrade of hers by the name of Nicholai. The assassination of Khvostov failed after a bomb thrown by Nicholai failed to detonate, and Shkolnik's bomb failed to kill him. Shkolnik and Nicholai were sentenced to death following the attempted assassination, but their sentence was ultimately commuted to a life sentence of hard labor in the Transbaikal by Tsar Nicholas II.

In 1912 he was elected to the Fourth Imperial State Duma as a member and president of the Russian Assembly, one of the right wing parties. He was Minister of the Interior from September 26, 1915 (Old Style) to March 3, 1916. His uncle Aleksandr Khvostov was opposed to the appointment of his nephew.

The Russian Minister of the Interior, A.N. Chvostov, has recently declared himself in favor of inaugurating a fight against the "yellow press", which has grown considerably during recent years. Not long ago, some of these newspapers were involved in "society scandals", their part in them being exposed by rather sensational trials. Mr. Chvostov's Ministry has under consideration a plan for exiling from Petrograd the journalists who were connected with the newspapers involved in the scandals.

After Khvostov came into office he began to intrigue against his colleagues, against the Prime Minister himself in order to get his place, and finally against his benefactor Rasputin. Khvostov and Iliodor concocted a plan to kill Rasputin. Khvostov had come to the conclusion that Rasputin was a German spy or agent. Evidence that Rasputin actually worked for the Germans is flimsy at best. In his efforts to plot against Rasputin (and not becoming Prime Minister) Khvostov had to resign. After Boris Stürmer, his uncle Aleksandr Khvostov, became his successor.

Khvostov was arrested and imprisoned in the Peter and Paul Fortress by the Russian Provisional Government during the February Revolution of 1917. In 1918, less than a year after the Bolsheviks seized power he was executed by firing squad in Petrovsky Park, Moscow.

Political offices
Preceded by Nikolai Borisovich Shcherbatov	Minister of Interior; September 26, 1915 – March 3, 1916	Succeeded by Boris Stürmer
