= Aleksandr Khvostov =

Russian politician (1857–1921)

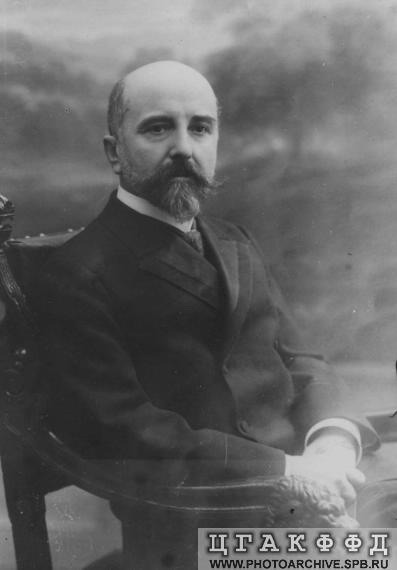
Aleksandr Khvostov in 1915.

Aleksandr Alekseevich Khvostov (Russian: Александр Алексеевич Хвостов; 8 January 1857 – 23 November 1921) was an Imperial Russian politician. After graduating from the Imperial Alexander Lyceum, he entered the Ministry of Justice.

He served as Minister of Justice from July 19, 1915, to July 22, 1916, and was responsible for the trial of Vladimir Sukhomlinov. He became Minister of Interior from July 22, 1916, to September 29, 1916 (New Style).

He was (and became known as) the uncle of Alexei Khvostov.

== Sources ==
- Out of My Past: The Memoirs of Count Kokovtsov Edited by H.H. Fisher and translated by Laura Matveev; Stanford University Press, 1935.
- The Memoirs of Count Witte Edited and translated by Sydney Harcave; Sharpe Press, 1990.

Political offices
Preceded by Ivan Shcheglovitov	Minister of Justice; 6 July 1915 – 7 July 1916 (Old Style)	Succeeded by Alexander Alexandrovich Makarov
Preceded by Boris Stürmer	Minister of Interior; 9 July 1916 – 3 September 1916 (Old Style)	Succeeded by Aleksandr Protopopov
