= Boris Shturmer =

Prime Minister of the Russian Empire in 1916

Baron Boris Shturmer
- Борис Штюрмер
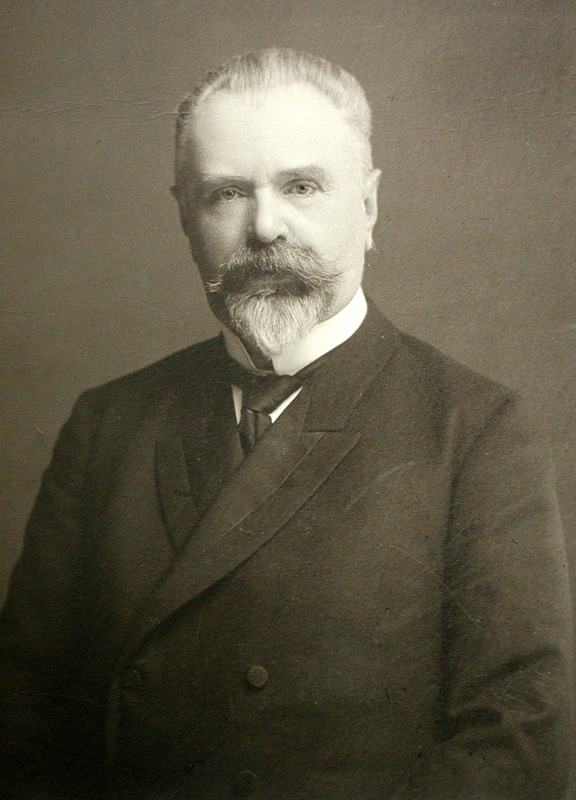

5th Prime Minister of Russia
- In office 2 February 1916 – 23 November 1916
- Monarch: Nicholas II
- Preceded by: Ivan Goremykin
- Succeeded by: Alexander Trepov

Minister of Foreign Affairs of Russia
- In office 7 July 1916 – 10 November 1916
- Preceded by: Sergey Sazonov
- Succeeded by: Nikolai Pokrovsky

Minister of the Interior of Russia
- In office 3 March 1916 – 7 July 1916
- Preceded by: Alexei Khvostov
- Succeeded by: Aleksandr Khvostov

Yaroslavl Governor
- In office 30 July 1896 – 10 August 1902
- Preceded by: Alexey Fride
- Succeeded by: Alexey Rogovich

Novgorod Governor
- In office 14 April 1894 – 30 July 1896
- Preceded by: Alexander Molosolov
- Succeeded by: Otton Medem

Personal details
- Born: 27 July 1848 Baykovo, Tver Governorate, Russian Empire
- Died: 2 September 1917 (aged 69) Petrograd, Petrograd Governorate, Russia
- Education: Saint Petersburg State University

Baron Boris Vladimirovich Shturmer (Stürmer) (Note: Also spelled Shtyurmer or Sturmer) (Russian: Бори́с Влади́мирович Штю́рмер; 27 July [O.S. 15 July] 1848 – 2 September [O.S. 20 August] 1917) was a Russian lawyer, a Master of Ceremonies at the Russian Court, and a district governor. He became a member of the Russian Assembly and served as prime minister in 1916. A confidant of the Empress Alexandra, under his administration the country suffered drastic inflation and a transportation breakdown, which led to severe food shortages. During the course of his career, he was Minister of Internal Affairs and Foreign Minister of the Russian Empire.

== Biography ==
Stürmer was born into a landowning family in Baykovo, Kesovogorsky District, Tver Governorate. His father Vladimir Vilgelmovich Stürmer was of German descent and a retired Captain of Cavalry in the Imperial Russian Army. His mother was Ermoniya Panina.

A graduate of the Faculty of Law, Saint Petersburg State University in 1872, Stürmer entered the Ministry of Justice, the Governing Senate and the Interior Ministry. He was appointed in 1879 as Master of the Bedchamber at the Russian Imperial Court.

=== Governor ===
In 1891 he became chairman of the district council in Tver. An appointment as Governor of Novgorod in 1894 and Yaroslavl in 1896 followed. Stürmer avoided any clash with the zemstvo, remaining patient. In a very delicate situation he declared himself a "conservative not out of fear but out of conscience".

In 1902 Vyacheslav von Plehve, the Minister of Interior appointed him as Director of the Department of General Affairs at the Ministry of Interior. After Plehve was killed, Stürmer was willing to succeed him. The tsar even signed a ukase to that effect, yet the post eventually went to Prince Svyatopolk-Mirsky. Stürmer was then admitted into the State Council of Imperial Russia in 1904. This appointment was an "absolutely exceptional example in the history of the Russian bureaucracy". He did not have the formal service qualification necessary for such a high appointment to hold the post of minister or the rank of senator. After Bloody Sunday (1905) again Stürmer was mentioned to become Minister of Interior. Stürmer became close friends with Alexei Bobrinsky. He dreamed of "autocracy, located in combination with the constitutional regime". Stürmer was one of those representatives of the bureaucratic elite, who preferred to distance themselves from the extreme right. Few members of the Council of State could boast of such a relationship with the monarch.

In the State Council, he supported Pyotr Stolypin and his closest collaborators on agrarian reform, land management and agriculture Chief Governor Alexander Krivoshein "in their endeavors in the field of devices peasants". Stürmer, being a dualist, opposed, on one hand, the Black Hundreds, speaking for unlimited autocracy, and the other – the Octobrists and the Kadets, to practice the idea of parliamentarism. Stürmer believed that the division of bureaucrats on the right and liberals required a very cautious attitude.

In the 1913 countrywide celebrations of the Romanov Tercentenary, he accompanied the tsar and his family on a journey to Tver. In autumn of the same year, he was appointed as mayor of Moscow as the candidate from the left was unacceptable to the tsar. He became a member of the Domestic Patriotic Union (OPS) – a moderately right-monarchist organization, founded in 1915. In November 1915 it was proposed the old prime minister Ivan Goremykin should be replaced by Alexei Khvostov. Though on 18 January 1916 the tsar invited Stürmer to discuss the possibility of a new job.

=== Prime minister ===
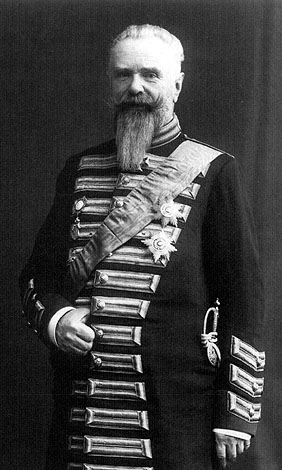
Boris Vladimirovich Stürmer (1913)

Stürmer petitioned Nicholas II to sanction the change of his German-surname to Panin. Since the Panins were a distinguished family of Russian nobility, the monarch could not agree to Stürmer's request until he had consulted all members of the Panin family. The tsarina and Grigori Rasputin had the opinion it was not necessary for Stürmer to change his name. Pending these proceedings, Stürmer was appointed prime minister on 20 January 1916, following the 76-year-old Ivan Goremykin, who was opposed to the convening of the Duma. Nicholas ordered the new prime minister to "take all measures" to ensure that "the government avoided any conflicts with the State Duma", and gave "specific instructions" to "improve relations between the government and the Romanovs".

On the eve of the opening of the Duma, the Prime Minister told Mikhail Rodzianko that "the government is ready to make a concession to the Progressive Bloc, provided that the unit itself is also ready to make compromises". It was a shift to the left; they expected he would launch a more liberal and conciliatory politics. The Duma gathered on 9 February 1916. The deputies were disappointed when Stürmer held his speech, as the politicians tried to bring the government under the control of the Duma. For the first time in his life, the tsar had made a visit to the Tauride Palace, which made it practically impossible to hiss at the new prime minister.

"As Director of his Secretariat Sturmer selected Manasyevich-Manuilov. This choice, which is regarded as scandalous, is significant." "The extreme right-wing deputy (A.I. Savenko, a leader of the Black Hundreds) could declare at the session of the Duma on February 29, 1916:

What a terrible thing it is for the country that, during the time of the greatest trials experienced by our fatherland, the country does not trust the government; no one trusts the government, even the right does not trust the government – in fact, the government does not trust itself and is not sure about tomorrow.

A strongly prevailing opinion that Rasputin was the actual ruler of the country was of great psychological importance. Alexei Khvostov and Iliodor concocted a plan to kill Rasputin. Khvostov created the rumour suggesting that Alexandra and Rasputin were German agents or spies. Evidence that Rasputin actually worked for the Germans is flimsy at best. Rather paranoid, Rasputin went to Alexander Spiridovich, head of the palace police, on 1 March. He was constantly in a state of nervous excitement. Khvostov had to resign within a week and Boris Stürmer was appointed in his place. In the same month Minister of War Alexei Polivanov, who in his few months of office had brought about a recovery of the efficiency of the Russian army, was removed and replaced by Dmitry Shuvayev. Because of the stresses of war on an inefficient government and at random politics, bureaucracy, zemstvos, in two months of office Stürmer succeeded in making the public want Goremykin back. According to Maurice Paléologue he had a taste for history, particularly the anecdotal and picturesque side of history. Again according to Paléologue Stürmer consulted Anna Vyrubova about everything. The French ambassador was aghast, depicting Stürmer as "worse than a mediocrity – a third rate intellect, mean spirit, low character, doubtful honesty, no experience, and no idea of state business".

From then everything went down, according to Alexei Khvostov. For War Minister Alexei Polivanov – who both had to leave politics in March 1916 – it was the beginning of the end. Stürmer took over the Ministry of Interior. After he was simultaneously acting as Minister of the Interior and Minister of Foreign Affairs, he was regarded by Rodzianko as a "dictator with full powers". Under his administration, the country suffered drastic inflation and a transportation breakdown, which led to severe food shortages. Russia's economy, which had been growing until the beginning of the Great War, was now declining at a very rapid rate. Stürmer was inclined to peace negotiations but his appointment was received with consternation, as an open affront to the whole nation. In June the tsar had to decide on the question of Polish autonomy, already academic given that Poland had been occupied by the Germans the previous year. Stürmer and most of his colleagues were more hostile to the idea than ever. The Minister of Foreign Affairs Sergey Sazonov, who had pleaded for an independent and autonomous Congress Poland, was replaced on 23 July ("Sturmer is secretly carrying on a very active campaign against him"). They disagreed on too many questions. "After Sazonov's dismissal Stürmer took the portfolio of Foreign Affairs; the emperor had ordered him to conduct the foreign policy of the Empire on the same principles as before, i.e., in the closest co-operation with the Allied Governments. His activities in this department resulted in the premature declaration of war by Romania, so disastrous for that country and for Russia." In July Aleksandr Khvostov, not in good health, was appointed as Minister of Interior (after the Brusilov Offensive Romania joined the Allies in August and attacked Transylvania). In September Alexander Protopopov, had been appointed as his successor. Protopopov, an industrialist, and landowner, raised the question of transferring the food supply from the Ministry of Agriculture to the Ministry of the Interior. A majority of the zemstvo leaders announced that they would not work with his ministry. His food plan was universally condemned. In October Vladimir Sukhomlinov was released from prison on the instigation of Alexandra, Rasputin, and Protopopov (on 24 October (O.S) the Kingdom of Poland was established by its occupiers). This time the public was outraged and the opposition parties decided to attack Stürmer, his government, and the "Dark forces". For them Stürmer simply let matters drift. The opposition parties decided to attack Stürmer, his government and the "Dark forces". Since Stürmer has been in power Rasputin's authority has greatly increased. For the liberals in the parliament, Grigori Rasputin, who believed in autocracy and absolute monarchy, was one of the main obstacles.

=== Downfall ===
On 1 November, Pavel Milyukov, concluding that Stürmer's policies placed in jeopardy the Triple Entente, delivered his famous "stupidity or treason" speech at the Imperial Duma, which had not been gathering since February. He highlighted numerous governmental failures. Alexander Kerensky called the ministers "hired assassins" and "cowards" and said they were "guided by the contemptible Grishka Rasputin!". Stürmer, followed by all his ministers, walked out. Grand Duke Alexander and his brother Grand Duke George requested the Tsar to fire Stürmer. Even the Tsar had to concede that Stürmer was as much of a red rag to the Duma as to everyone else. On 10 November he was sacked, the foreign ministry was temporarily led by his deputy Anatoly Neratov. It appeared to Maurice Paléologue, the French ambassador, Stürmer was a broken man. Following his resignation, Stürmer ran for a seat in the Fourth Duma.

He was arrested by the Russian Provisional Government after the February Revolution in 1917 and died of uremia in September at the hospital of the Peter and Paul Fortress (or the Kresty Prison).

== Notes ==
Political offices
Preceded by Ivan Goremykin	Prime Minister of Russia; 2 February – 23 November 1916 (N.S.)	Succeeded by Alexander Trepov
Preceded by Alexei Khvostov	Interior Minister of Russia; 3 March – 9 July 1916	Succeeded by Aleksandr Khvostov
Preceded by Sergei Sazonov	Foreign Minister of Russia; 20 July – 23 November 1916	Succeeded by Nikolai Pokrovsky
