= Marshal of Nobility (Russia) =

Local elected office in Russian Empire

Marshal of Nobility (Russian: предводитель дворянства) was an elected position in Russian local self-government prior to the Russian Revolution of 1917.

== History ==
The nobility of each governorate formed a corporation, the Noble Society (ru:Дворянское общество), governed by the Assembly of Nobility with an elected Marshal of Nobility at its head. Each subdivision of a governorate (uyezd) also had its elected Marshal of Nobility.

Besides the Assembly of Nobility, Marshals of Nobility also chaired several local boards including the council of Justices of the peace, local education boards, boards that administered drafting of the men into the army, etc.

After creation of all-estate Zemstvo local self-government system, Marshals of Nobility presided over Zemstvo assemblies.
