= Lanskoy =

Lanskoy is a surname. Notable people with the surname include:

- Alexander Lanskoy (1758-1784), Russian general, favourite and lover of Catherine the Great
- André Lanskoy (1902–1976), Russian painter and printmaker
- Michel Lanskoy, French table tennis player
- Sergey Stepanovich Lanskoy (1787-1862), Russian statesman
- Vasily Lanskoy (1754–1831), Russian statesman and politician
