= Valuev Circular =

Decree issued by the Russian Empire

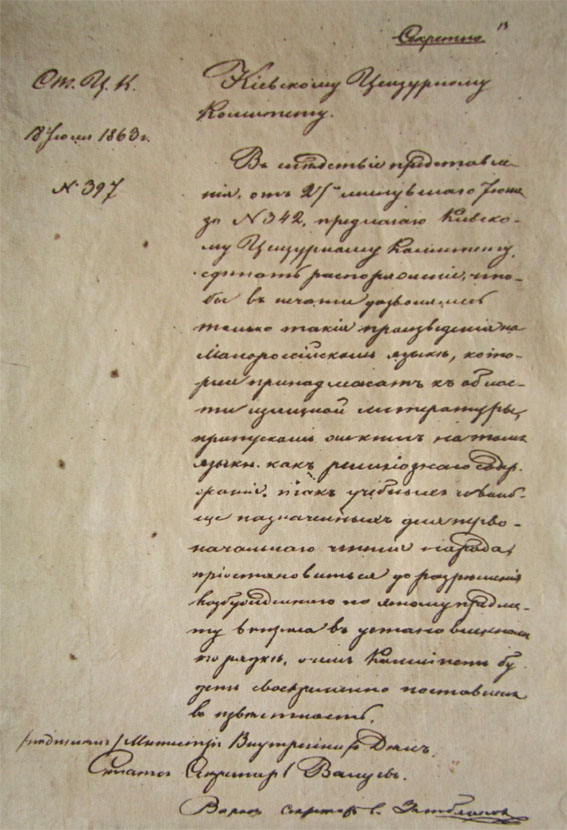
Valuev Circular

The Valuev Circular (Russian: Валуевский циркуляр, romanized: Valuyevsky tsirkulyar; Ukrainian: Валуєвський циркуляр, romanized: Valuievskyi tsyrkuliar) of 18 (30) July 1863 was a decree (ukaz) issued by Pyotr Valuev (Valuyev), Minister of Internal Affairs of the Russian Empire, by which many publications (religious and educational literature recommended for the use in primary literacy training) in the "Little Russian" (Ukrainian) language were forbidden, except for belles-lettres works.

== History ==
The circular put the reason for the growing number of textbooks in Ukrainian and beginner-level books in Ukrainian as "the Poles' political interests" and the "separatist intentions of some of the Little Russians". The circular quoted the opinion of the Kiev Censorship Committee that "a separate Little Russian language never existed, does not exist, and shall not exist, and the tongue used by commoners (i.e. Ukrainian) is nothing but Russian corrupted by the influence of Poland."

The circular ordered the Censorship Committees to ban the publication of religious texts, educational texts, and beginner-level books in Ukrainian; but permitted publication of belles-lettres works in the language.

Further restrictions were placed on Ukrainian by the Ems Ukaz in 1876, which completely prohibited the usage of the language in open print.

== Gallery ==
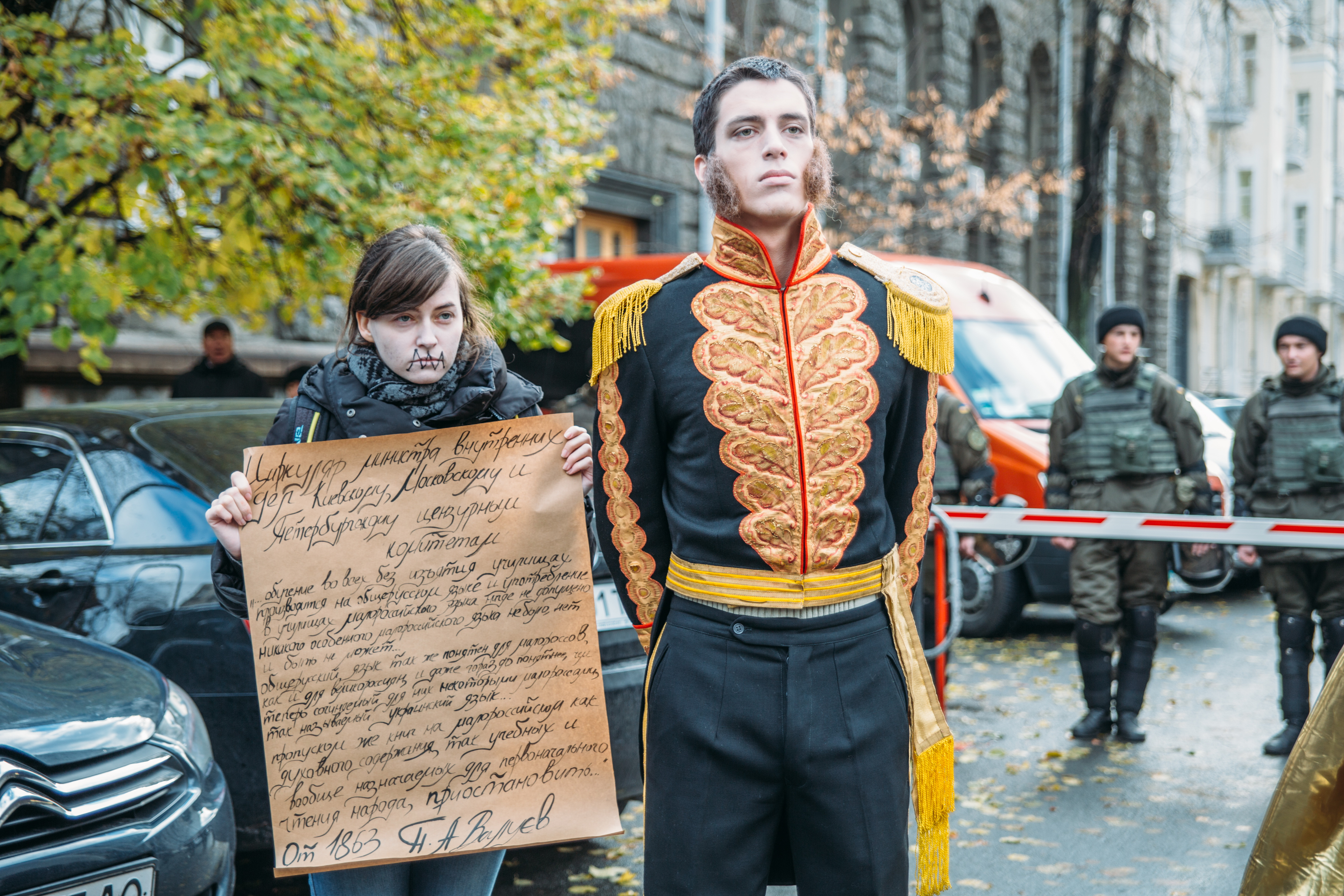
"Pyotr Valuyev" and his "Circular" near the Administration of the President of Ukraine. Performance against Russification and with the demand of legislative protection for the Ukrainian language. Day of Ukrainian Literature and Language, 2015.

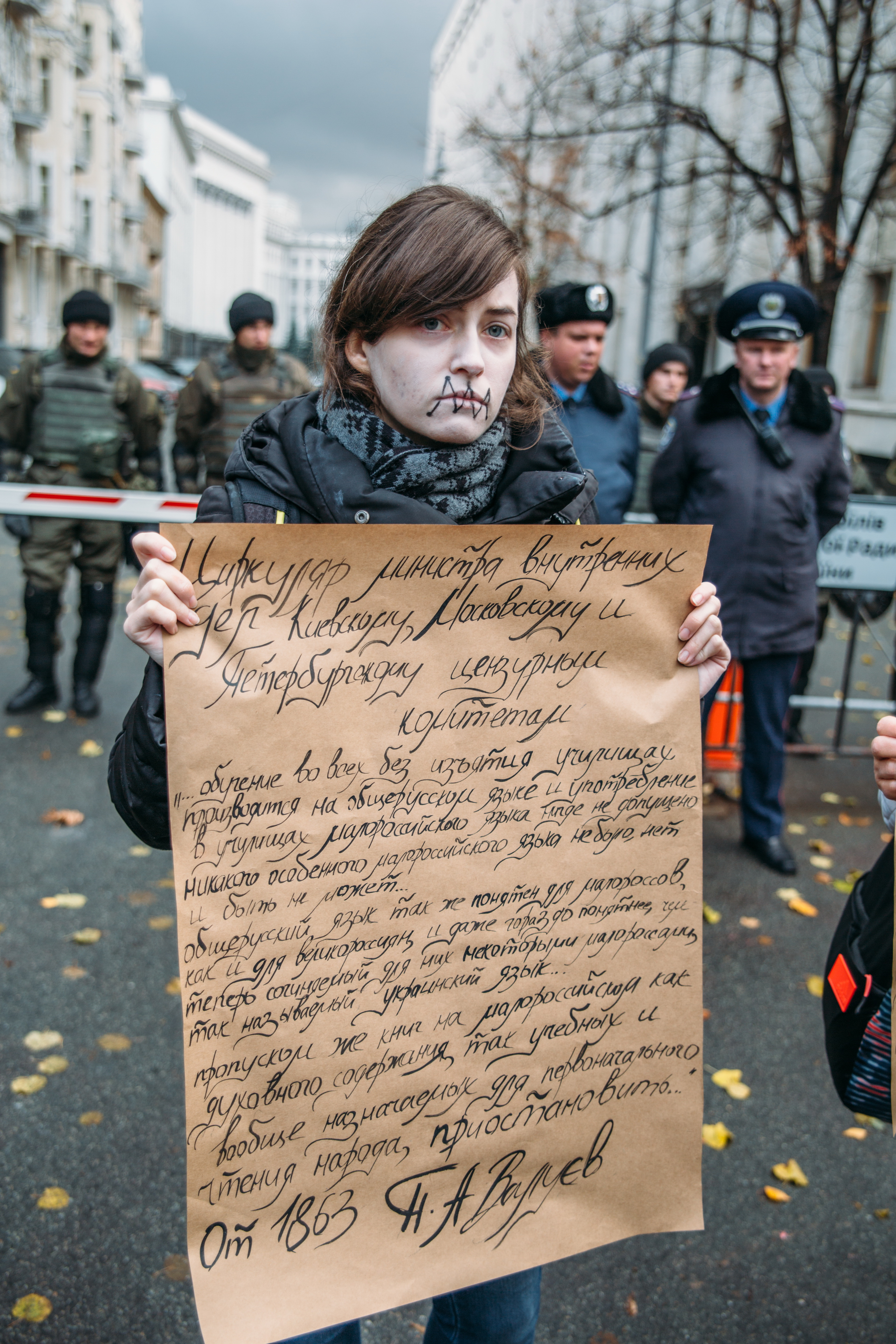
Imitation of the Valuev Circular. Performance against Russification

== See also ==
- Lithuanian press ban
