= Nikolai Shcherbatov =

Russian politician

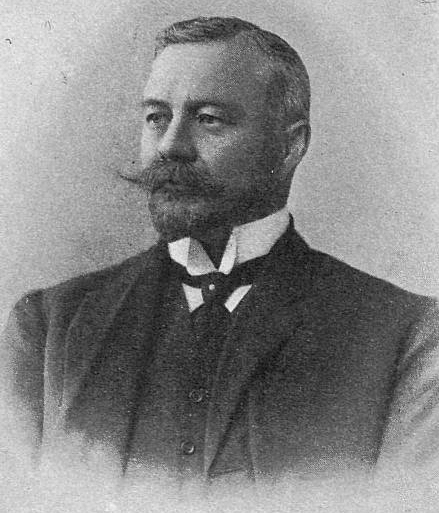
Nicholay Borisovich Chtcherbatov

Prince Nicholay Borisovich Shcherbatov (Russian: Никола́й Бори́сович Щерба́тов), born on 22 January 1868 (corresponds to 3 February in the Julian calendar) in Tsarskoe Selo, and died on 29 June 1943 in Starnberg, Bavaria. He was a Russian politician and served as the minister of the Interior from 5 June 1915 to 26 September 1915.

== Life ==
He was born as prince Nikolai Borisovich Shcherbatov in the princely Rurik dynasty. He came out a graduate of the Corps of Pages, as early as 1889. He served in the famous 44e regiment of dragoons of Nizhny Novgorod. In 1892, he was transferred to a regiment of reserve cavalry guards. By 1889 two members of the Russian nobility, Count Stroganov and Prince Shcherbatov, established Arabian stud farms to meet the continued need to breed Arabians as a source of pure bloodstock.

=== Political career ===
Between 1895 and 1897, he held posts at the Ministry of State Property, and then returned to live on his domain, located in the province of Poltava, where he owned distilleries and beet-sugar factories. In 1905 the prince managed to gather around him a circle of moderate supporters in the Kharkov Governorate. He was one of the founders of the right wing Party of Law and Order. In December 1905, the party held a meeting in St. Petersburg, the assembly appointed to sit as a member of the imperial Council of the Party of Law and Order. Some time later, he was elected president of the same party. During the holding of congresses of the workers working in rural and urban areas, the prince served as a delegate of the zemstvos of the governorate of Poltava. From 1905 to 1907, after having been elected, Chtcherbatov served as a member of the United Nobility. In 1907, during the convocation of the Third Duma and the Russian nobility, the prince sat in the quality of voter.

In 1907, the prince was elected Marshal of Nobility of the Poltava Oblast. In 1909, he was entrusted the charge of chamberlain. He was one of the founders of the all-Russian Bank for grain trade (1910). In 1912, elected, he served as State councillor of the centre right to the zemstvo of Poltava. On 1 January 1913, Nicholas II of Russia gave him the task of managing the production of the breeding of horses as a great connoisseur of race horses.

On 5 June 1915, during World War I, the prince succeeded Nikolay Maklakov on the post of minister of the Interior; he headed the Special Corps of Gendarmes, the uniformed security police. In opposition circles Shcherbatov was seen as a possible candidate for the presidency of the Council of Ministers in the "Ministry of confidence." On 26 September 1915, the prince resigned from his post of minister of the Interior. Alexei Khvostov succeeded him. In the same year, he was elected to the State Council of Imperial Russia by the zemstvo of Poltava. Shcherbatov issued "On the prohibition of the slaughter for sale of calves and the sale and purchase of these calves" (1916), and "On measures to reduce the consumption of meat and meat products from cattle, calves, sheep, pigs and piglets" (1916).

== Exile ==
After the October Revolution, the prince moved to Germany. From 4 April to 11 April 1926 he attended the meeting of the Russian Foreign Congress at the Hotel Majestic in Paris, which brought together representatives of Russian diasporas from 26 countries. He died in Starnberg, a shelter for millionaires.

Political offices
Preceded by Nikolay Maklakov	Minister of Interior; June 5, 1915 – September 26, 1915	Succeeded by Alexei Khvostov
