= Pyotr Valuyev =

Russian statesman

Count Pyotr Aleksandrovich Valuev
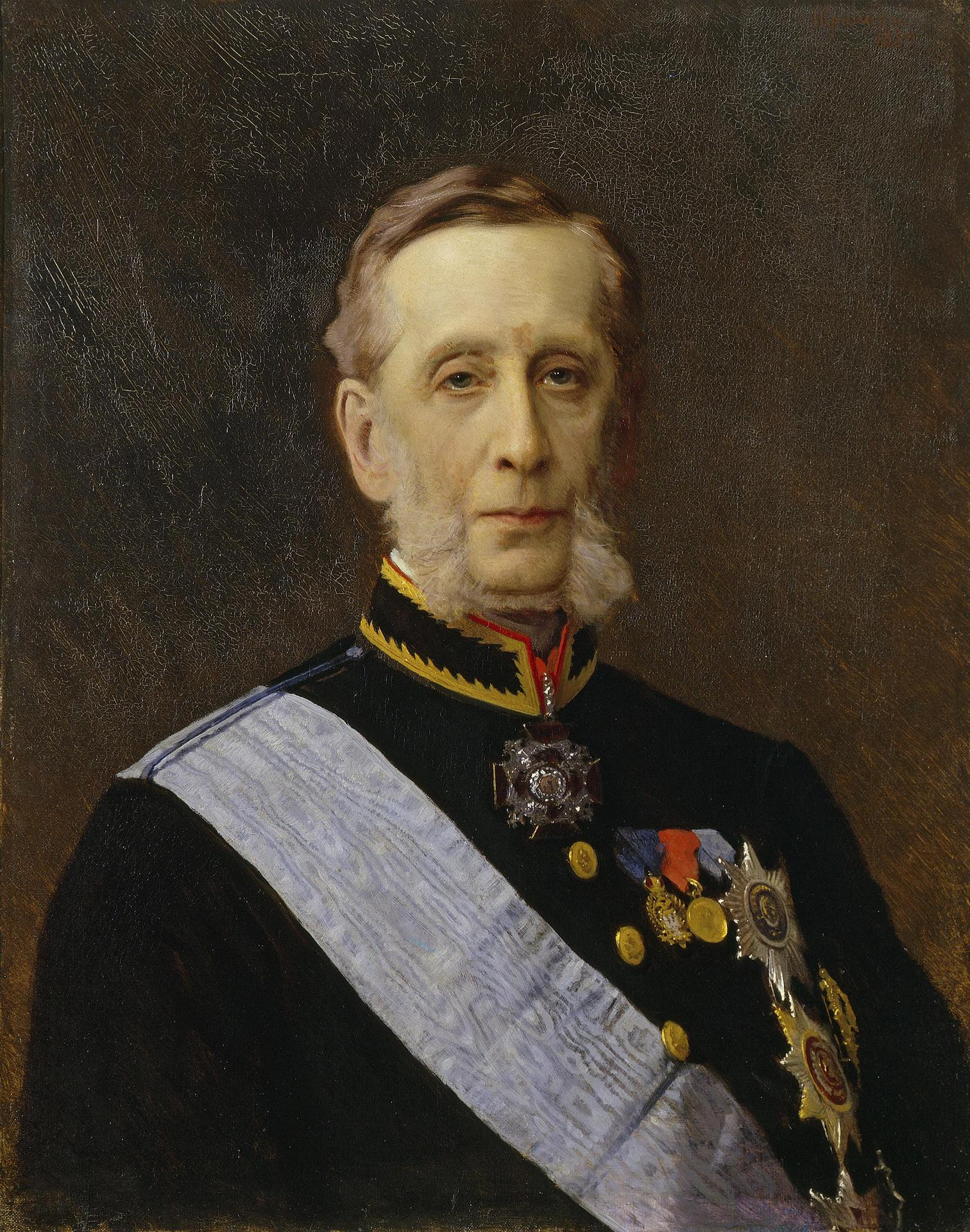
- Portrait by Ivan Kramskoi
- Born: 22 September 1815; Tsaritsyno District, Russia
- Died: 27 January 1890 (aged 74); St. Petersburg, Russia

Count Pyotr Aleksandrovich Valuev (Russian: Граф Пётр Алекса́ндрович Валу́ев; September 22, 1815 – January 27, 1890) was a Russian politician and writer.

== Biography ==
Valuev was born in the Tsaritsyno District of Moscow on September 22, 1815.

Valuev served as Emperor Alexander II's Minister of Interior between April 23, 1861 to March 9, 1868, and as Minister of State Assets from February 17, 1872 to 1877.

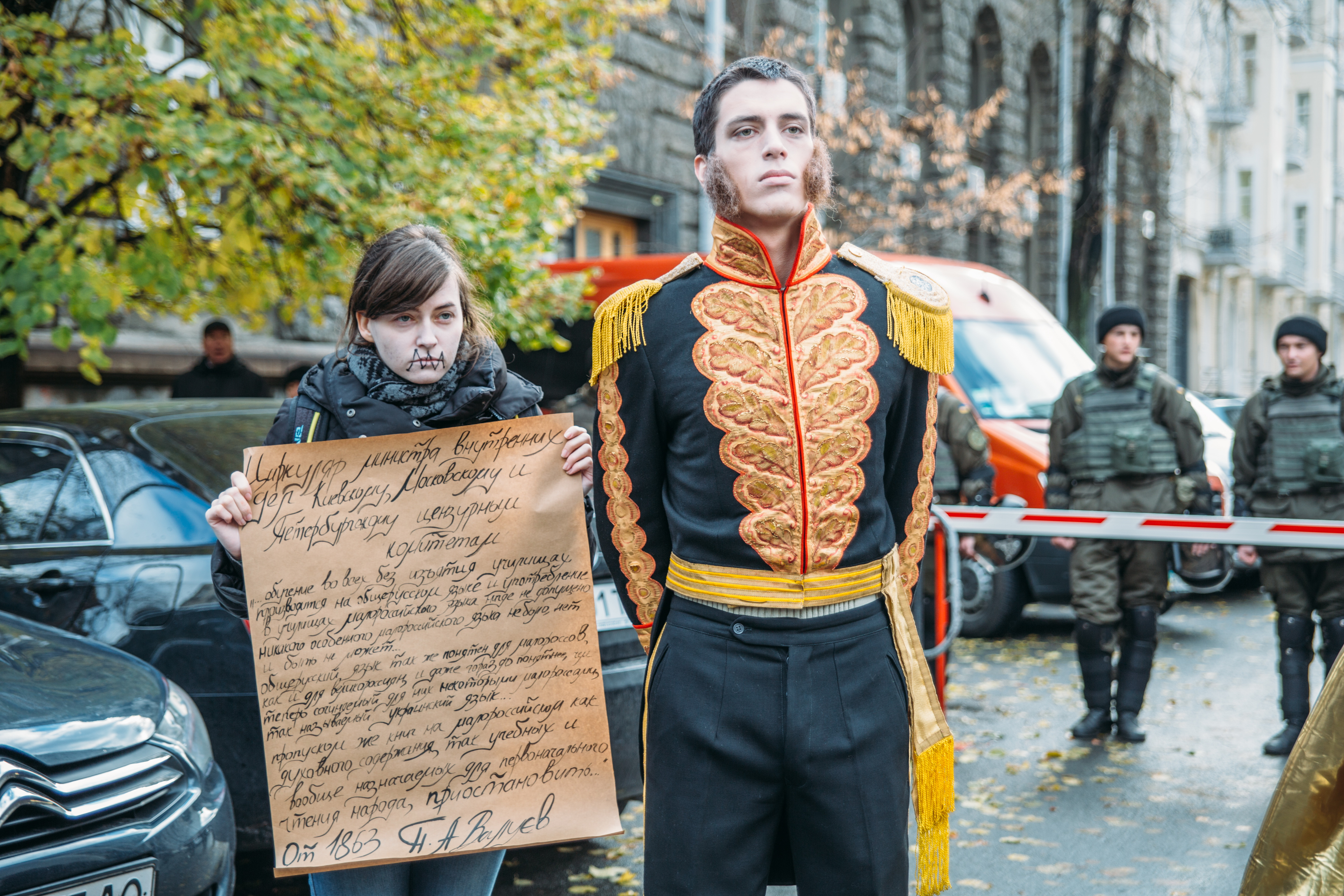
"Pyotr Valuyev" and his "Circular" near the Administration of the President of Ukraine. Performance against Russification and with the demand of legislative protection for the Ukrainian language. Day of Ukrainian Literature and Language, 2015.

In 1863, he drafted a secret decree, which later became known as the Valuev Circular that forbade the publication of religious, as well as educational books, along with those intended for the initial literacy instruction of the commoners, in the Ukrainian language. Only belles-lettres was allowed to be published. In his secret instruction issued on 30 July, 1863, informing the minister of education of the ban, he wrote that the Ukrainian language, separate from Russian, "did not exist, does not exist, and cannot exist".

The Valuev Circular is considered one of the most vivid manifestations of the chauvinist policy of the Russian autocracy, aimed at strengthening Russification, national, spiritual and political oppression of the Ukrainian people.

In 1877, he was made Chairman of the Committee of Ministers. In 1880, his influence began to decline when he was eclipsed by his opponent, Count Loris-Melikov. Valuev was sent into retirement in October 1881 by the son of the recently assassinated Alexander II, Alexander III, since as Minister of State Assets, he had held final responsibility for the so-called plundering of the Bashkir lands in the 1870s.

Valuev was always close to the literary world. In 1834 he was transferred from Moscow to St. Petersburg and became acquainted with prominent Russian poets Aleksandr Pushkin and Pyotr Vyazemsky. Valuev may have served as one of the prototypes for the protagonist of Pushkin's novel The Captain's Daughter (1836), and the same year he married Vyazemsky's daughter.

Valuev began writing fiction in the 1870s while still serving in the government. His first novel, Lorin (1878) was circulated in manuscript, although it remained unpublished until 1882. Once he was retired, he concentrated on writing and published four novels, essays on history of Christianity and a devotional calendar with his poetry prior to his death in 1890 in St. Petersburg.

Throughout most of his adult life, Valuev kept a diary, which was published after his death and has proved to be an important source of information on the inner circle of the Russian Empire in the 19th century.

== See also ==
- Valuev Circular
- Russification of Ukraine

== Notes ==
Preceded by Sergey Lanskoy	Minister of Interior; 23 April 1861 – 9 March 1868	Succeeded by Alexander Timashev
Preceded by Nicholas Pavlovich Ignatiev	Chairman of the Committee of Ministers; 1877 – 4 October 1881	Succeeded by Mikhail Tarielovich Loris-Melikov
