= Ungurmuiža Manor =

Manor house in Latvia

Coordinates: 57°21′45″N 25°05′19″E

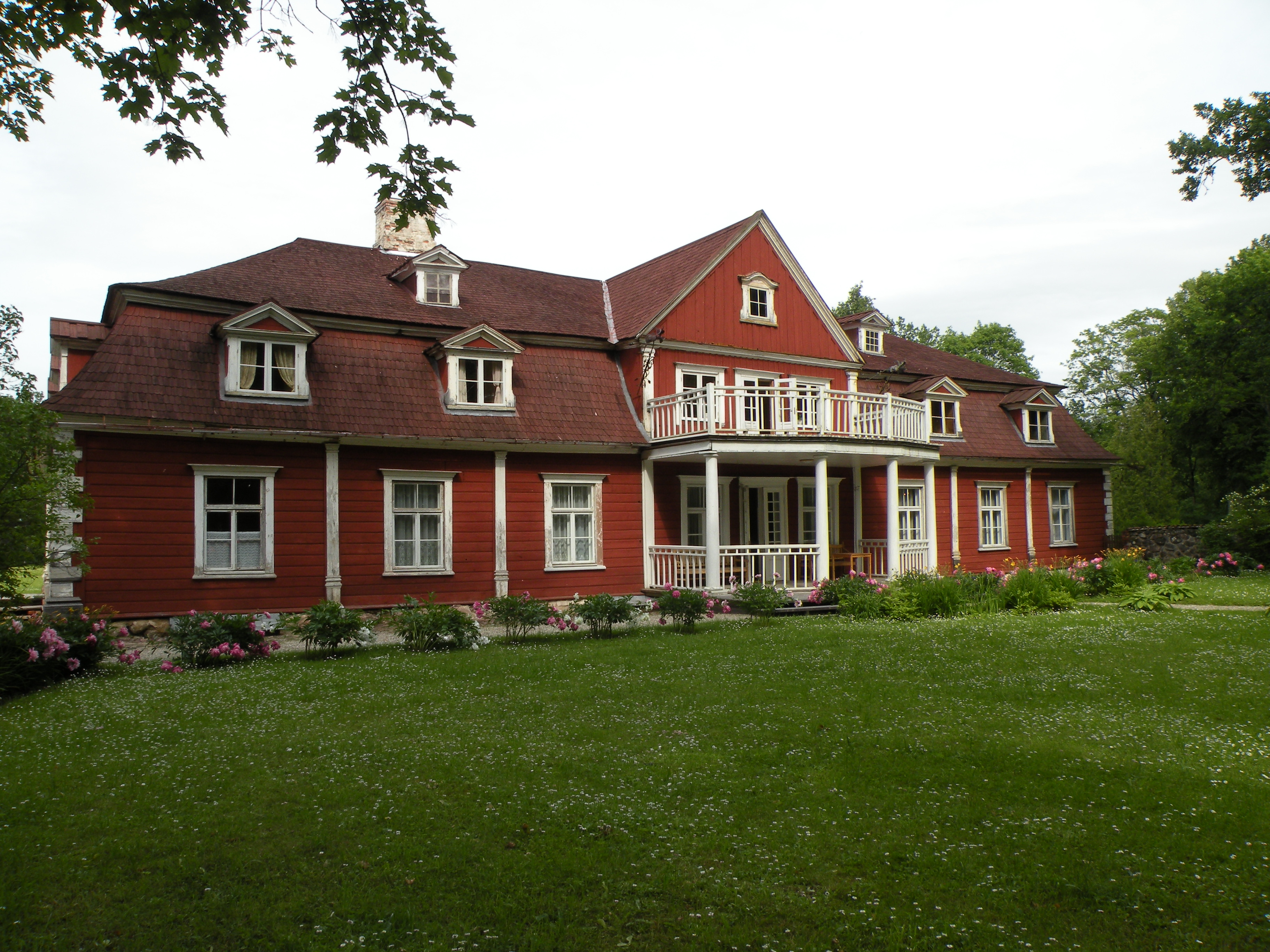
- Interactive map of the Ungurmuiža Manor area

General information
- Architectural style: Baroque
- Location: Cēsis Municipality, Latvia
- Construction started: 1731
- Completed: 1732
- Client: Balthasar Freiherr von Campenhausen

Ungurmuiža Manor (Latvian: Ungurmuižas kungu māja, German: Herrenhaus Orellen/Gut Orellen) is a manor house in the Raiskums Parish of Cēsis Municipality, in the historical region of Vidzeme, in northern Latvia. The estate is named for the von Ungern family, who owned it prior to the middle of the 17th century. The current wooden manor was built in 1731–1732 in Baroque style for the owner, Lieutenant General Balthasar Freiherr von Campenhausen. The von Campenhausen family owned the estate from 1728 to 1939. Ungurmuiža manor was one of those manors which was not nationalised in Latvian agrarian reforms of the 1920s. Despite its quite small size, manor is elegant construction with richest wall paintings and ceiling plafonds of Baroque age in Vidzeme region.

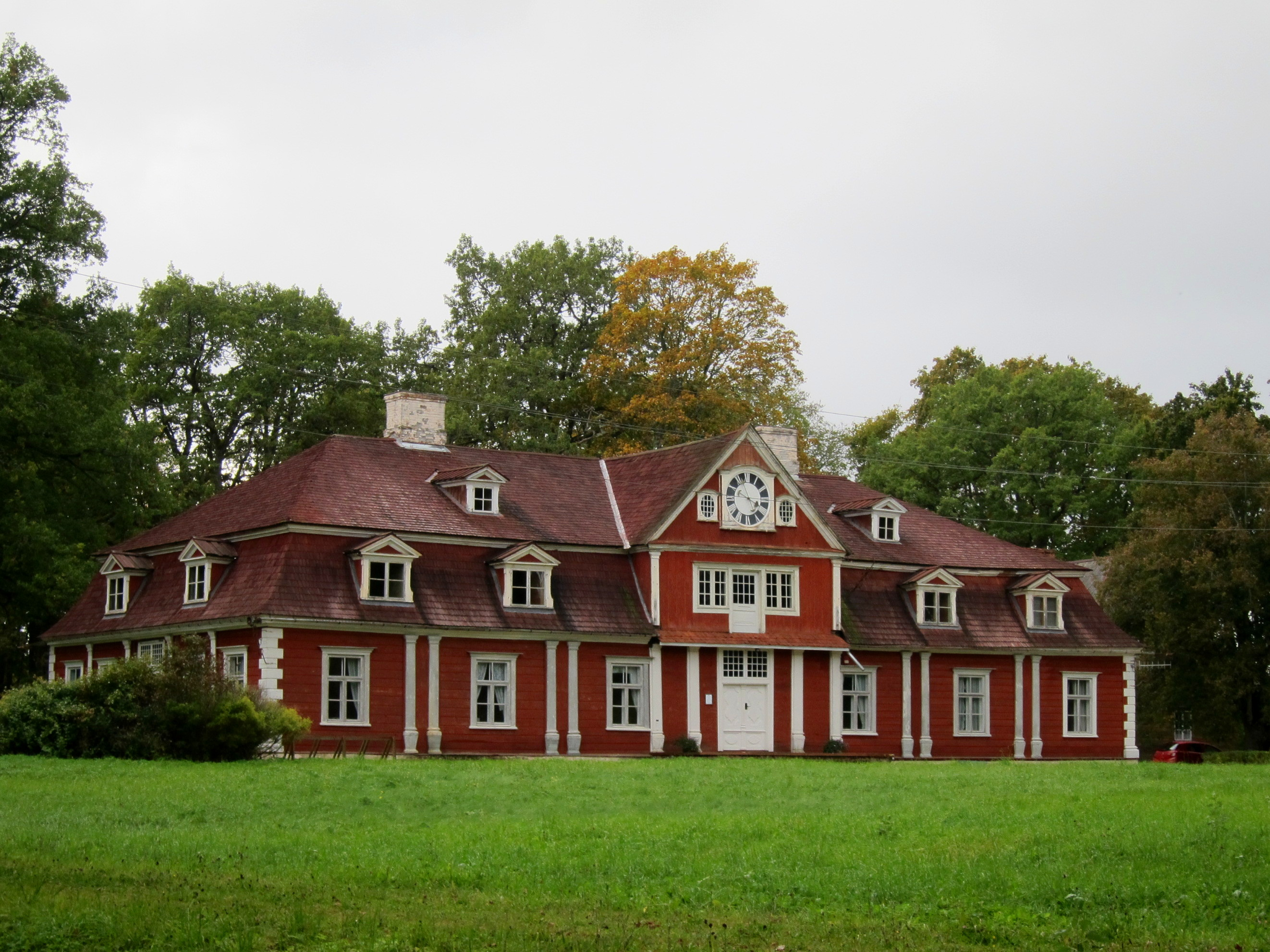
Ungurmuiža manor on 2013.09.29

== See also ==
- List of palaces and manor houses in Latvia
