= Mariya Shkolnik =

Russian politician and terrorist (1885–1955)

- Мария Марковна Школьник
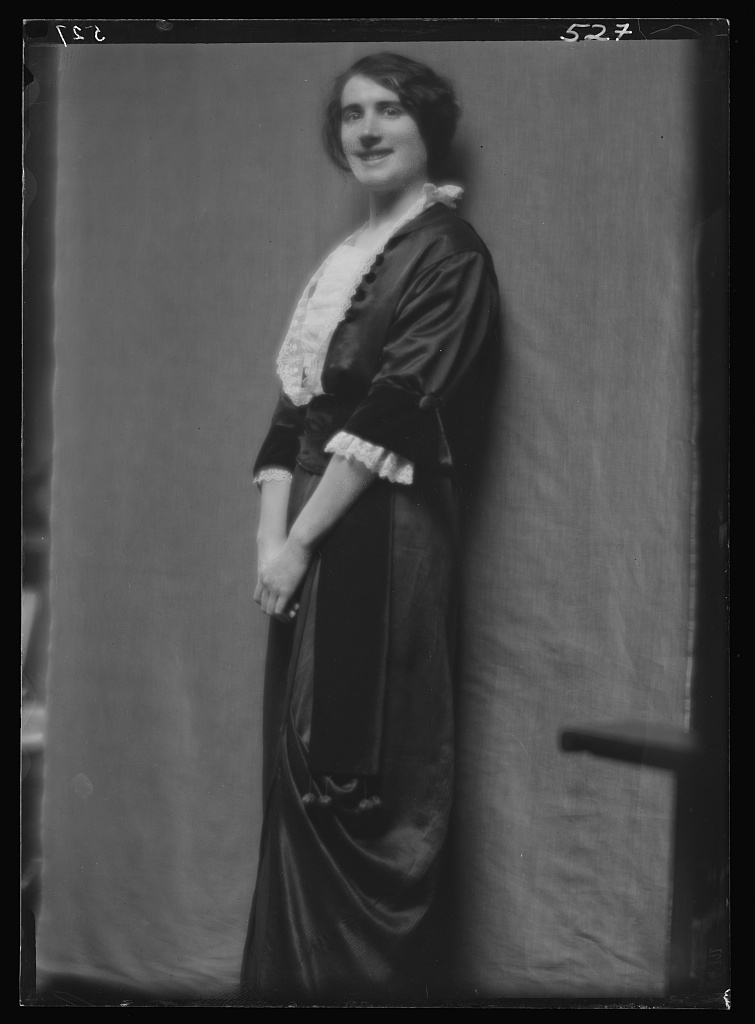
- Born: 18 March [O.S. 06 March]1882; Borovoi-Mlin
- Died: April 9, 1955 (aged 73)
- Other name: Marie Sukloff
- Occupation: Member of the Russian Revolutionary Movement
- Organization: Socialist Revolutionary Party
- Known for: Russian socialist and revolutionary
- Criminal charges: Association with a society dedicated to the overthrow of the government, conspiring against the tsar, and attempted assassination
- Criminal penalty: Exile to Siberia and death (commuted to exile once more)

Mariya Markovna Shkolnik (previously transliterated as Marie Sukloff, Russian: Мари́я Ма́рковна Шко́льник) (6 March 1882 - 9 April 1955) was a member of the Russian revolutionary movement that attempted to assassinate Alexei Khvostov and escaped exile in Siberia twice. Mariya was a member of the Socialist Revolutionary Party and assisted in the propaganda efforts of the party among peasant populations.

== Life ==
Mariya Shkolnik was born to a poor, Jewish, peasant family in Borovoi-Mlin, a village in the Vilna Governorate of the Russian Empire (now in the Grodno Region of Belarus), not far from the town of Smarhon'. Mariya started working at a young age and was not sent to school. Mariya remained illiterate till the age of 13. She did however learn to read from the daughter of a rabbi named Hannah who would often meet with peasant girls in Vilna to teach them progressive politics and economics.

Strikes and demonstrations demanding the establishment of a ten-hour working day began in Vilna when Mariya was a teenager. Through an organizer from the Jewish Bund, Mariya joined the revolutionary movement.

After organizing in Ashmyany, Mariya felt that her future as a revolutionary would be better in a city. Eventually, she convinced her father to send her to her uncle's apartment in Odessa. In Odessa she worked in a candy factory and lived with others who shared her political ideology.

In 1918 she returned from exile to Soviet Russia. In 1927 she became a member of the Communist Party of the Soviet Union.

== Works ==
Mariya published her memoirs "Life of a Former Terrorist" in 1927 in which she talks about her life from early childhood to emigration.
