= Yuri Nikolayevich Maklakov =

Russian teacher (1892–1969)

- Born: 13 August 1892; Russian Empire
- Died: 3 April 1969 (aged 76)
- Occupation: Russian teacher

Yuri Nikolayevich Maklakov (13 August 1892 – 3 April 1969) was a Russian teacher and a Catholic convert from Russian Orthodoxy.

== Biography ==
Maklakov was born on 13 August 1892 in the Russian Empire, in the family of the Minister of the Interior, Nikolai Maklakov. He graduated from the Imperial College of Law, participating in World War I, after the Russian Revolution, he emigrated to France, where he later converted to Catholicism from Russian Orthodoxy. For more than 30 years he researched and taught activities in the Catholic University of Lille, where he held the chair of Russian language and literature, and taught Russian literature at the Catholic University of Paris. He studied the Fiodor Dostoievski. Maklakov has founded the Russian Institute at the Catholic University. He was awarded the Papal Order of Saint Gregory the Great. Yuri Maklakov died on 3 April 1969. He was buried in the Sainte-Geneviève-des-Bois Russian Cemetery.

== Sources ==
Russian press about Catholicism / / Ringing of church bells, 1932, № 8. - P. 95.

Chronicle / / Ringing of church bells, 1933, № 9. - P. 78-79.

Unforgotten grave. 4 T.. - M., 2004. - P. 317.

The new Russian word. - New York, 1969, № 20518.

Russian thought. - Paris, 1969, № 2737, 2738.

Grezin II alphabetical list Russian graves in the cemetery of Sainte-Genevieve-des-Bois. - Paris, 1995. Biographical information provided by Vladimir Kolupaev
