= Balthasar von Campenhausen =

Russian statesman of Baltic German origin (1772–1823)

Baron Balthasar von Campenhausen
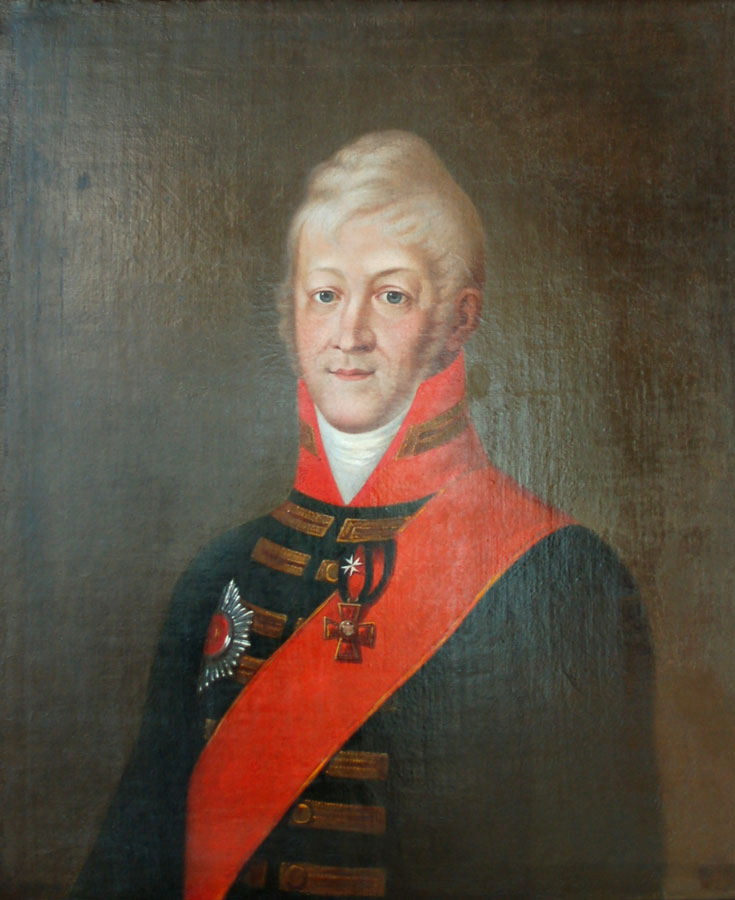

Governor of Taganrog
- In office 1805–1809
- Preceded by: Apollon Dashkov
- Succeeded by: Pyotr Papkov

Minister of Internal Affairs of Russia
- In office 1823
- Preceded by: Viktor Kochubey
- Succeeded by: Vasily Lanskoy

Personal details
- Born: 5 January 1772 Lenzenhoff, Russian Empire
- Died: 11 September 1823 (aged 51) Saint Petersburg, Russian Empire

Baron Balthasar von Campenhausen (Russian: Балтазар Балтазарович Кампенгаузен, romanized: Baltazar Baltazarovich Kampengauzen; 5 January 1772 – 11 September 1823) was a Russian statesman of Baltic German descent who held the ranks of privy councilor and chamberlain. He served as the governor of Taganrog from 1805 to 1809 and as the minister of internal affairs in 1823.

== Personal life ==
=== Family ===
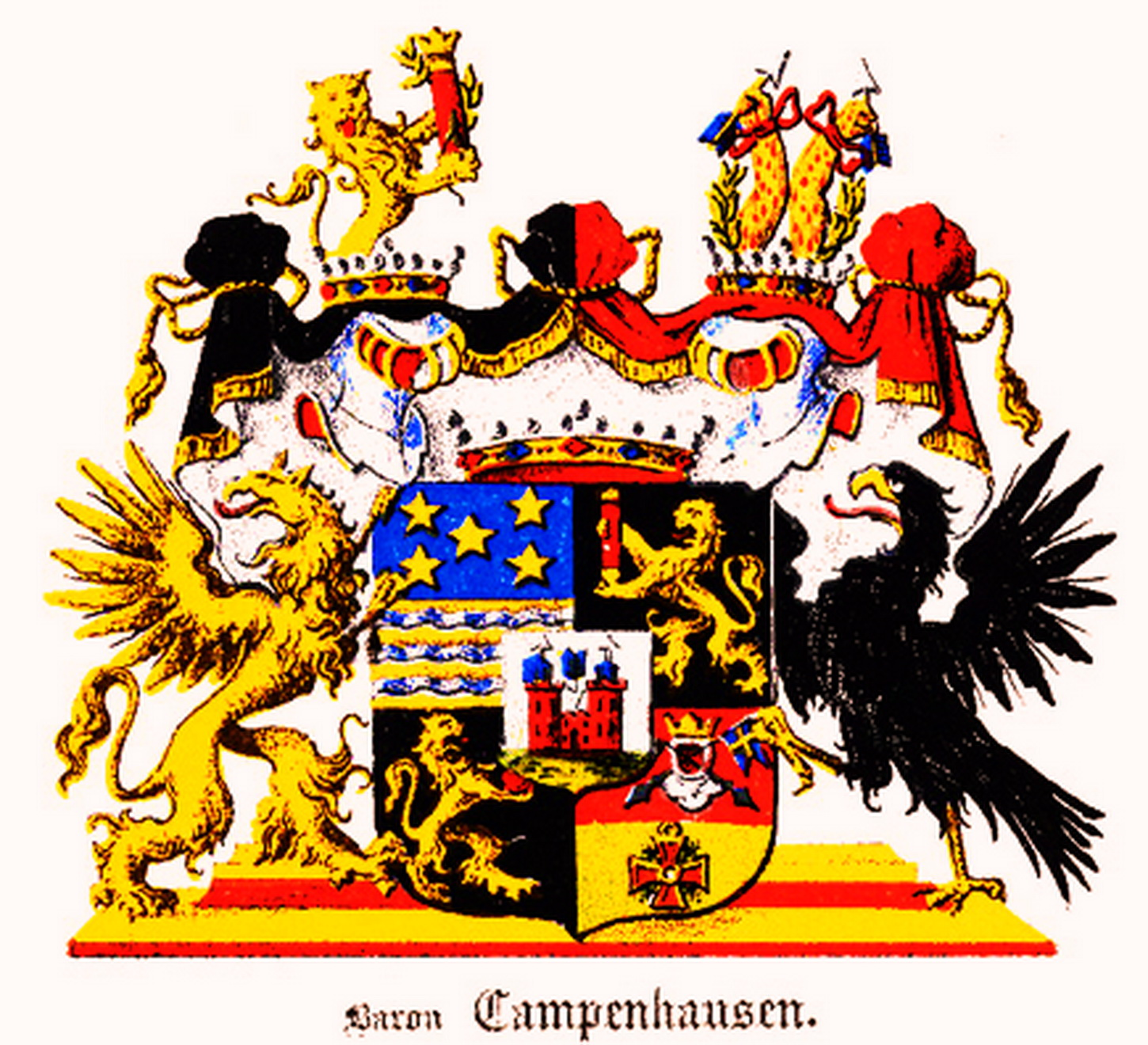
The ancestral coat of arms of von Campenhausen

Balthasar Freiherr von Campenhausen was born in 1772, in Lenzenhof, into a Baltic German noble family Campenhausen residing in the province of Livonia (then part of Imperial Russia, now Latvia and Estonia). The ancestors of Balthasar Campenhausen served Swedish and Russian sovereigns.

=== Education ===
He studied in the universities of Leipzig, Wittenberg and Göttingen that he graduated with a thesis Entwürfe zu physikalischen Völker-, Religions— und Kulturkarten des russischen Reiches at the Royal Scientific Society.

== Career ==
Balthasar Campenhausen served as ambassador to Poland and Sweden, headed reorganization of the commercial school and medical surgery institution in Saint Petersburg and during the rule of Alexander I of Russia, he was appointed director of the 3rd Department (medical dept.) at the Russian Ministry of Internal Affairs. In 1802, Russian emperor Alexander I of Russia sent Campenhausen to the South Russian seaports on Black and Azov Sea to see the reasons for poor trade development and to provide quarantine conditions in the South of Russia during the outbreak of bubonic plague in Turkey and Persia.

In 1805, Balthasar von Campenhausen was appointed as the governor of Taganrog. During his tenure, he created the Taganrog customs district; built a new slope to the haven and new stone storehouses for goods; started construction of coasting vessels for the transportation of goods to other Russian ports on Black and Azov Seas; inaugurated the navigation school, the commercial gymnasium and the commercial court; opened the first drugstore and introduced the posts of the city doctor and city midwife; established the construction and building committee that planned the city's future architectural development; introduced oil lighting in the streets; began paving and greening of the streets; and founded the City Park in April 1806. Two streets in Taganrog were later named after Campenhausen: Bolshoy Campenhausenskiy (now: Comsomolskiy) and Malo-Campenhausenskiy (now: Spartakovskiy).

In 1808, he was tasked with inspecting wharves and lighthouses in the Azov corridor and collecting data on shipping and wrecks.

In 1809, Campenhausen was named the state treasurer and privy councilor in 1810, member of the State Council and senator in 1811, and minister of internal affairs in 1823. He died in Saint Petersburg in 1823.

== Bibliography ==
- Versuch einer geographisch-statistischen Beschreibung der Statthalterschaften des russischen Reichs. I. Statthalterschaft Olouez (Göttingen, 1792);
- Elemente des russischen Staatsrechts, oder Hauptzüge der Grundverfassung des russischen Kaiserthums (Göttingen, 1792);
- Auswahl topographischer Merkwürdigkeiten des St. Peterburgischen Gouvernements (Riga, 1797);
- Liefländisches Magazin, oder Sammlung publicistisch-statistischer Materialien zur Kenntniss der Verfassung und Statistik von Liefland (Gota, 1803);
- Genealogisch-chronologische Geschichte des allerdurchlauchtigsten Hauses Romanow und seines vorälterlichen Stammhauses (Leipzig, 1805).

== Sources ==
- "Кампенгаузен, Бальтазар (политик)" . Brockhaus and Efron Encyclopedic Dictionary (in Russian). 1906.

Political offices
Preceded by Viktor Kochubey	Minister of Interior; June 1823 – August 1823	Succeeded by Vasily Lanskoy
Government offices
Preceded by Apollon Dashkov	Governors of Taganrog; 1805–1809	Succeeded by Pyotr Papkov
