= Apollon Dashkov =

Russian infantry general

- Born: 1753
- Died: 2 September 1808 (aged 54–55)
- Military career
- Allegiance: Russia
- Service years: 1757–1800
- Conflicts: Russo-Turkish War
- Other work: Governor of Taganrog

Apollon Andreevich Dashkov (Russian: Дашков, Аполлон Андреевич; 1753–1808) was a Russian infantry general and the first Governor of Taganrog.

== Early years ==
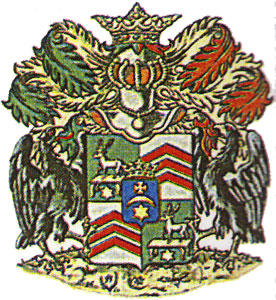
Ancestral coat of arms of Dashkov

Appolon Andreevich Dashkov was born in 1753. At the age of four he was enlisted into bombardment regiment of artillery. Also when he was a child he was promoted to the rank of corporal, quarter-master-sergeant and of sergeant when he was 14. Sixteen years-old Dashkov received an appointment as bayonet-junker (like warrant officer but not an officer) and on the January 1, 1772, he was promoted to the rank of second lieutenant.

== Military career ==
Apollon Dashkov participated in the Russo-Turkish War, 1768-1774: in 1771 Dashkov took part in the march from the Taganrog fortress to Crimean peninsula to the Yenikale Strait fortress, which was soon taken by the Russian detachment commanded by Prince Fiodor Fiodorovich Shcherbatov, later in 1772 and 1774 in marches against Crimean Tatars. For a few times he secured positions of quartermaster, and in 1782 and 1783 Dashkov was in Crimea, and later in the army of frontier division as captain. After the annexing of Crimea, he attended the triumphant present oath of citizenship to Russia by Tatars at the Karasu-bazar. In 1786 Dashkov became lieutenant colonel. That year he was appointed in infantry and two years later transferred to Kiev’s Grenadier regiment, and took part in the second Turkish war.

Mayor-general and commander of the Kiev grenadier regiment since 1797; later - chef of Nasheburg musketeer regiment; commander of the Moscow garrison regiment in December 1797- April 1798; commander of the Elisavetgrad garrison regiment in 1798 and commander of Kherson garrison regiment in 1799–1800.

== Career of politician ==
In 1801 Dashkov received the post of tsar's representative in the Black Sea Fleet chancellery. On October 8, 1802, tsar Alexander I of Russia appointed Apollon Dashkov as the first governor-general of Taganrog, where he was charged with reconstruction of the fortress. During Dashkov's governorship (1802–1805) were built several fortress buildings: infirmary, officers headquarters and barracks; improved the equipment of the municipal fire-brigade.

In 1805, Dashkov was assigned to 6th department of the Senate.

He died on September 2, 1808 (Old Style).

Government offices
Preceded by commander of fortress Rumyantsev	Governors of Taganrog; 1802–1805	Succeeded by Balthasar von Campenhausen
