= Arseny Zakrevsky =

Russian politician and army commander (1783–1865)

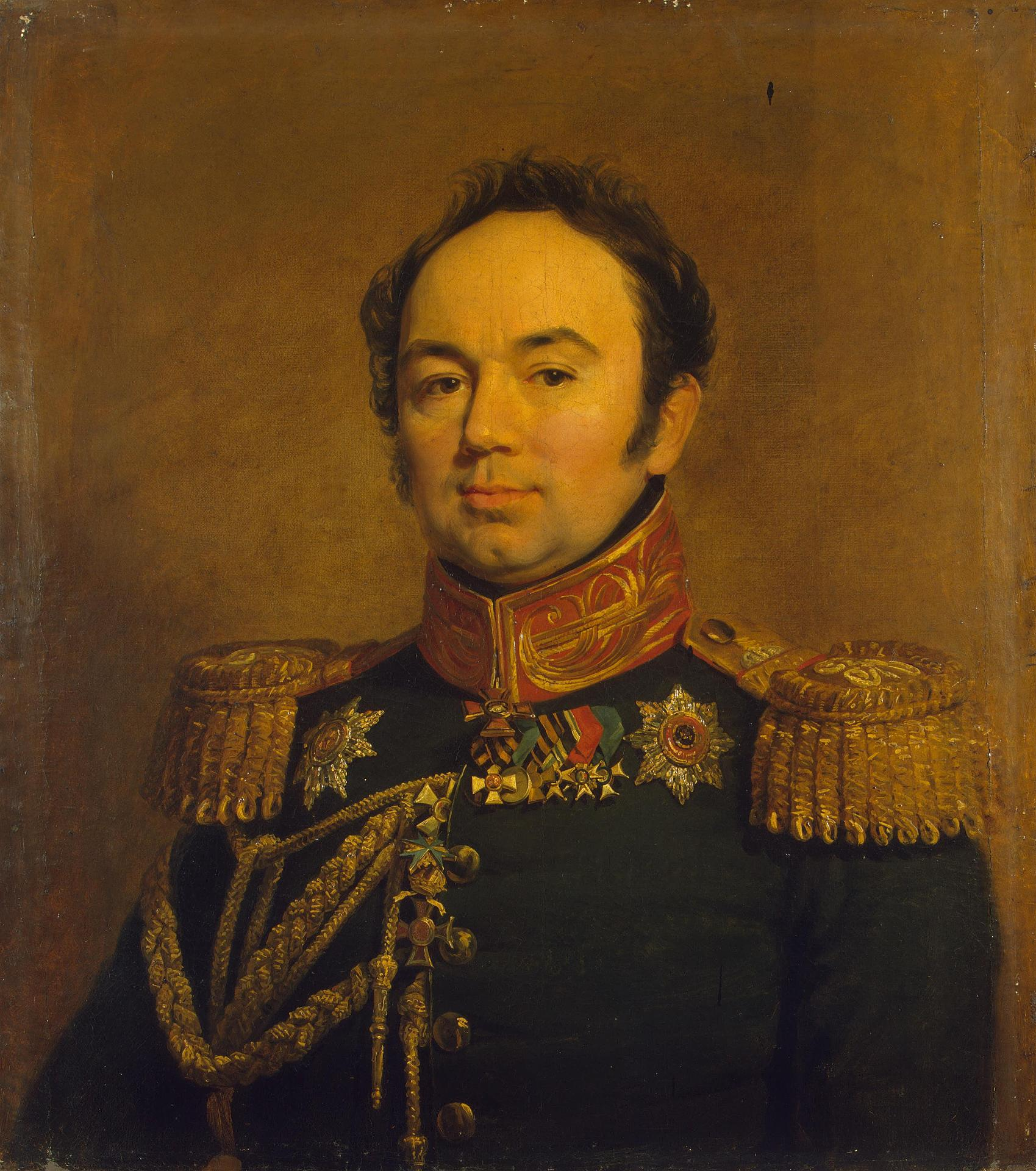
Portrait by George Dawe, 1820–1825

Count Arseny Andreyevich Zakryevsky (Russian: Арсений Андреевич Закревский; September 24, 1783 or 1786, in Tver Governorate – January 23, 1865, in Florence) was a Russian statesman who served as the minister of the interior from April 19, 1828 to November 19, 1831.

== Life ==
The son of a poor Tver nobleman of distant Polish origin, Zakrevsky began his military career in a cadet corps, from which he graduated in 1802 with the rank of junior infantry officer. By 1829, he rose to the rank of infantry general. Between 1824 and 1831, Zakrevsky served as the governor-general of Finland. Being a military man and a hard-liner, he was trusted by Emperor Nicholas I. From 1828 to 1831, he also briefly served as the Russian minister of the interior.

He was elevated to the title of count in the Finnish nobility, and was registered in the House of Nobility under the name Zakrewsky as the Finnish comital house number nine. This made him and his family "Finnish citizens", which also meant that afterwards, when out of office, they did not need passports to go to the territory of the grand duchy from the Russian side of the border, a coveted privilege.

== Sources ==
- "Закревский, Арсений Андреевич" . Brockhaus and Efron Encyclopedic Dictionary (in Russian). 1906.

Political offices
Preceded by Fabian Steinheil	Governor-General of Finland; 1824–1831	Succeeded by Alexander Sergeyevich Menshikov
Government offices
Preceded by Vasily Lanskoy	Minister of Interior; 1828–1831	Succeeded by Dmitry Bludov
