= Hans von Campenhausen =

German theologian

- Born: 16 December 1903; Rosenbeck (now Susz, Poland), Kingdom of Prussia
- Died: 6 January 1989 (aged 85)
- Occupation: Theologian

Hans Erich Freiherr von Campenhausen (16 December 1903 – 6 January 1989) was a German Baltic Protestant theologian. He is one of the most important Protestant ecclesiastical historians of the 20th century.

== Life and work ==
Hans von Campenhausen came from the landowning nobility. Born in Rosenbeck, Livonia, Campenhausen's family escaped to Germany during the Russian Revolution. He graduated from high school in Heidelberg in 1922, and went on to study theology and history at the universities of Heidelberg and Marburg where he was particularly influenced by the theologians Rudolf Bultmann, Hans Freiherr von Soden and Martin Dibelius. In 1930 he was appointed to Göttingen.

Despite his signature to the Law for the Reconstruction of the Professional Civil Service von Campenhausen stood distantly opposed to National Socialism, and later joined the Confessing Church. From 1935, he was responsible for lectures and classes at the universities of Gießen, Greifswald, Göttingen, Kiel, Heidelberg and Vienna. Two appointments failed for political reasons: in 1935 he succeeded Heinrich Bornkamm's successor in Giessen and in 1937 succeeded Walther Köhler as professor of church history at the University of Heidelberg.

In 1945 he was appointed professor of church history in Heidelberg as the successor of his teacher, Hans von Schubert, and in 1946 was elected Rector. In Heidelberg, his most important works were Kirchliches Amt und geistliche Vollmacht in den ersten drei Jahrhunderten (1953) and Die Entstehung der christlichen Bibel (1968). His works on the historical Church Fathers, Griechische Kirchenväter (1955) and Lateinische Kirchenväter (1960) (Latin Church Fathers and Greek Church Fathers) have been translated into many languages, and constantly reprinted. He also published numerous studies on the Early Church. He was president of the Patristic Commission of the West German Academies of Science from its foundation in 1960 for twenty years.

A severe visual impairment made it increasingly difficult, and eventually impossible, for him to do scientific work in his last years of life.

He was awarded honorary degrees from the universities of Göttingen, Oslo, St. Andrews, Uppsala and Vienna. For more than 40 years he was a member of the Heidelberg Academy of Sciences. He was a correspondent member of the British Academy and the Göttingen Academy of Science. He was also an honorary member of the American Academy of Arts and Sciences (1972).

== Selected bibliography ==
- Ambrosius of Milan as a church politician. De Gruyter, Berlin, 1929.
- The Passion Sarcophage to the History of an Early Christian Scene. Marburg 1929.
- The idea of martyrdom in the old church. Vandenhoeck & Ruprecht, Göttingen, Germany 1936.
- Church office and spiritual authority in the first three centuries. Mohr, Tübingen 1953.
- Greek Church Fathers. Kohlhammer Verlag, Stuttgart, 1955; 8th ed. 1993, ISBN 3-17-012887-6 .
- Latin Church Fathers. Kohlhammer Verlag, Stuttgart 1960; 7. unchanged edition 1995, ISBN 3-17-013504-X .
- From the early days of Christianity. Studies of the church history of the 1st and 2nd century. Mohr, Tübingen 1963.
- The origin of the Christian Bible. Mohr, Tübingen, 1968; Reprinted in 2003.
- Theologenspieß und -spaß. 1976, ISBN 3-579-03853-2.
