= List of ministers of internal affairs of Russia =

This is a list of ministers of internal affairs of Russia.

== Russian Empire ==
Minister	Term of office		Emperor
Viktor Kochubey	8 September 1802	24 November 1807	Alexander I
Prince; Aleksey Kurakin	24 November 1807	31 March 1810	Alexander I
Osip Kozodavlev	31 March 1810	24 June 1819	Alexander I
Prince; Alexander Golitsyn	24 June 1819	4 November 1819	Alexander I
Viktor Kochubey	4 November 1819	28 June 1823	Alexander I
Baron; Balthasar von Campenhausen	28 June 1823	29 August 1823	Alexander I
Vasily Stepanovich Lanskoy	29 August 1823	19 April 1828	Alexander I
Vasily Stepanovich Lanskoy	29 August 1823	19 April 1828	Nicholas I
Count; Arseny Zakrevsky	19 April 1828	19 November 1831	Nicholas I
Count; Dmitry Bludov	12 February 1832	15 February 1839	Nicholas I
Count; Alexander Stroganov	10 March 1839	23 September 1841	Nicholas I
Count; Lev Perovsky	23 September 1841	30 August 1852	Nicholas I
Dmitry Bibikov	30 August 1852	20 August 1855	Nicholas I
Dmitry Bibikov	30 August 1852	20 August 1855	Alexander II
Sergey Stepanovich Lanskoy	20 August 1855	23 April 1861	Alexander II
Pyotr Valuev	23 April 1861	9 March 1868	Alexander II
Alexander Timashev	9 March 1868	27 November 1878	Alexander II
Lev Makov	27 November 1878	6 August 1880	Alexander II
Count; Mikhail Loris-Melikov	6 August 1880	4 May 1881	Alexander II
Count; Mikhail Loris-Melikov	6 August 1880	4 May 1881	Alexander III
Nikolay Ignatyev	4 May 1881	30 May 1882	Alexander III
Count; Dmitry Tolstoy	30 May 1882	25 April 1889	Alexander III
Ivan Durnovo	28 April 1889	15 October 1895	Alexander III
Ivan Durnovo	28 April 1889	15 October 1895	Nicholas II
Ivan Goremykin	15 October 1895	20 October 1899	Nicholas II
Dmitry Sipyagin	20 October 1899	2 April 1902	Nicholas II
Vyacheslav von Plehve	4 April 1902	15 July 1904	Nicholas II
Prince; Pyotr Sviatopolk-Mirsky	26 August 1904	18 January 1905	Nicholas II
Alexander Bulygin	20 January 1905	22 October 1905	Nicholas II
Pyotr Durnovo	23 October 1905	22 April 1906	Nicholas II
Pyotr Stolypin	26 April 1906	5 September 1911	Nicholas II
Alexander Makarov	20 September 1911	16 December 1912	Nicholas II
Nikolay Maklakov	16 December 1912	5 June 1915	Nicholas II
Prince; Nikolay Shcherbatov	5 June 1915	26 September 1915	Nicholas II
Alexey Khvostov	26 September 1915	3 March 1916	Nicholas II
Boris Stürmer	3 March 1916	7 July 1916	Nicholas II
Alexander Khvostov	7 July 1916	16 September 1916	Nicholas II
Alexander Protopopov	16 September 1916	28 February 1917	Nicholas II

== Provisional Government/Russian Republic ==
Minister	Party	Term of office		Prime Minister
Prince; Georgy Lvov	Constitutional Democratic Party	15 March 1917	20 July 1917	Georgy Lvov
Irakli Tsereteli	Social Democratic Labour Party (Menshevik)	23 July 1917	6 August 1917	Alexander Kerensky
Nikolai Avksentiev	Socialist Revolutionary Party	7 August 1917	15 September 1917	Alexander Kerensky
Alexey Nikitin	Social Democratic Labour Party (Menshevik)	15 September 1917	7 November 1917	Alexander Kerensky

== Russian SFSR ==
=== 1917–1930 ===
Minister	Party	Term of Office		Head of State
Alexei Rykov	Social Democratic Labour Party (Bolshevik)	8 November 1917	17 November 1917	Lev Kamenev
Grigory Petrovsky	Communist Party	17 November 1917	30 March 1919	Lev Kamenev
Grigory Petrovsky	Communist Party	17 November 1917	30 March 1919	Yakov Sverdlov
Grigory Petrovsky	Communist Party	17 November 1917	30 March 1919	Mikhail Vladimirsky
Felix Dzerzhinsky	Communist Party	30 March 1919	6 July 1923	Mikhail Kalinin
Alexander Beloborodov	Communist Party	30 August 1923	3 December 1927	Mikhail Kalinin
Vladimir Tolmachyov	Communist Party	2 January 1928	15 December 1930	Mikhail Kalinin

=== 1955–1966 ===
Minister	Party	Term of office		Head of state
Nikolay Stakhanov	Communist Party	22 February 1955	21 July 1961	Mikhail Tarasov
Nikolay Stakhanov	Communist Party	22 February 1955	21 July 1961	Nikolay Ignatov
Nikolay Stakhanov	Communist Party	22 February 1955	21 July 1961	Nikolay Organov
Vadim Tikunov	Communist Party	21 July 1961	17 September 1966	Nikolay Organov
Vadim Tikunov	Communist Party	21 July 1961	17 September 1966	Nikolay Ignatov

=== 1989–1992 ===
Minister	Party	Term of office		Head of state
Vasily P. Trushin	Communist Party	27 October 1989	September 1990	Vitaly Vorotnikov
Vasily P. Trushin	Communist Party	27 October 1989	September 1990	Boris Yeltsin
Viktor Barannikov	Independent	8 September 1990	13 September 1991	Boris Yeltsin
Andrei Dunayev	Communist Party	13 September 1991	15 January 1992	Boris Yeltsin

== Russian Federation ==
Minister	Party	Term of office		President
General of the army Viktor Yerin	Independent	15 January 1992	30 June 1995	Boris Yeltsin
General of the army Anatoly Kulikov	Independent	7 July 1995	23 March 1998	Boris Yeltsin
Colonel general Pavel Maslov (acting)	Independent	23 March 1998	30 March 1998	Boris Yeltsin
Colonel general Sergei Stepashin	Independent	30 March 1998	12 May 1999	Boris Yeltsin
Colonel general Vladimir Vasilyev (acting)	Independent	12 May 1999	21 May 1999	Boris Yeltsin
Colonel general Vladimir Rushailo	Independent	21 May 1999	28 March 2001	Boris Yeltsin
Colonel general Vladimir Rushailo	Independent	21 May 1999	28 March 2001	Vladimir Putin
Boris Gryzlov	United Russia	28 March 2001	24 December 2003	Vladimir Putin
General of the army Rashid Nurgaliyev	United Russia	24 December 2003	21 May 2012	Vladimir Putin
General of the army Rashid Nurgaliyev	United Russia	24 December 2003	21 May 2012	Dmitry Medvedev
General of the police Vladimir Kolokoltsev	United Russia	21 May 2012	Incumbent	Vladimir Putin

== See also ==
- Ministry of Internal Affairs
- Russian Council of Ministers
- Ministry of Police of Imperial Russia
