= Day of Ukrainian Literature and Language =

- Observed by: Ukraine
- Type: Cultural
- Date: 27 October
- Next time: 27 October 2026
- Frequency: annual

The Day of Ukrainian Literature and Language (Ukrainian: День української писемності та мови, romanized: Den ukrainskoi pysemnosti ta movy) is a holiday of the development of the State Language, which is celebrated every year in Ukraine on October 27.

According to the Revised Julian calendar and Gregorian calendar, it is a day honoring the memory of Nestor the Chronicler, a follower of the creators of Cyrillic script, Cyril and Methodius.

== History ==
The holiday began on November 9, 1997, when the President of Ukraine Leonid Kuchma issued a Decree No. 1241/97 "On the Day of Ukrainian Literature and Language" in support of the initiative of public organizations and taking into account the important role of the Ukrainian language in consolidating Ukrainian society.

== Features of the celebration ==
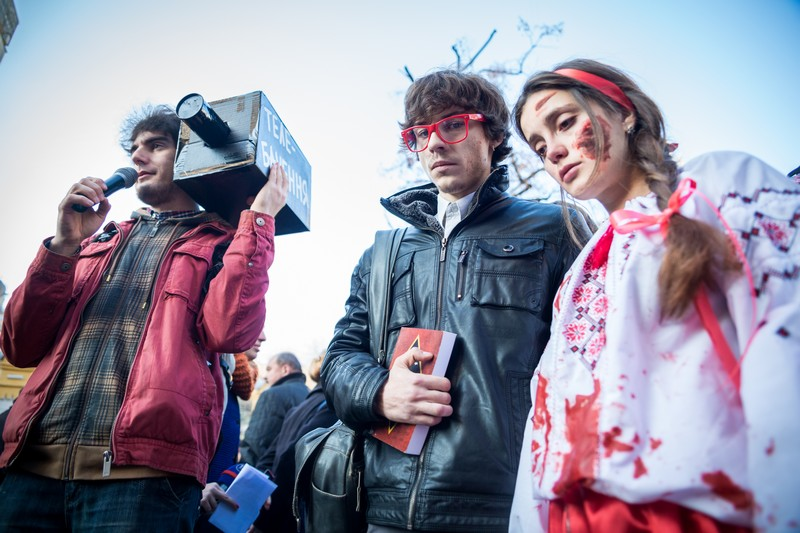
Performance in Kyiv, 2014

On the Day of Ukrainian Literature and Language, according to tradition:

- lay flowers at the monument to Nestor the Chronicler;
- celebrate the best popularizers of the Ukrainian word;
- encourage publishing houses that publish literature in the Ukrainian language;
- The Petro Jacyk International Competition of Ukrainian Language Experts is held with the support of the Ministry of Education and Science of Ukraine and the League of Ukrainian Patrons. The annual number of participants is over 5 million from 20 countries.

There was also a tradition on November 9, when parents took their children to school and then went to church: to place a candle in front of the image of Nestor the Chronicler and pray that he would help the child with his studies.

On the Day of Ukrainian Literature and Language, the Ukrainian Radio traditionally hosts a radio dictation of national unity. This campaign was launched in 2000. Since then, every year everyone can take part in writing a radio dictation and not so much to find out whether they know the Ukrainian language well, but to demonstrate unity with all those who love and respect the Ukrainian word.

== Features of the celebration in 2010 ==
In 2010, the Minister of Education and Science, a representative of the Party of Regions Dmytro Tabachnyk announced the refusal of the Ministry of Education and Science of Ukraine to finance the International Competition of Ukrainian language experts. Petra Jacika. The competition was held without the participation of the Ministry of Education and Science of Ukraine.

A protest action "Do business, not language!" Took place in Kyiv directed against the bill "On Languages" No. 1015-3, which significantly narrows the scope of the Ukrainian language. About 500 people took part in the event dedicated to the Day of Ukrainian Literature and Language on Bankova Street near the Presidential Administration. Among them are students and teachers of the National Technical University of Ukraine "Kyiv Polytechnic Institute", Kyiv National Taras Shevchenko University and the National University "Kyiv-Mohyla Academy". The action was also joined by an elderly man with a poster "The worst rulers in the history of Ukraine: Lenin. Stalin, Yanukovych ". Protesting against the Law of Ukraine "On Languages" No. 1015-3, the audience chanted "Do business, not language!". The presidential administration sent congratulations to the protesters from the head of state. However, according to protesters, Viktor Yanukovych has nothing to do with his writing. After that, an inflatable ball with a diameter of about one meter with the inscription "Law on Languages" was pierced, which was supposed to symbolize the prevention of its adoption. From Bankova, the protesters marched to Independence Square, shouting "Glory to the Nation", "Death to the Enemies", "Ukraine is a Nation", "Ukraine Above All!", "Kyiv is a Ukrainian City", "We Love the Ukrainian Language", "One". the state is one language "," Get rid of the law on languages "," In the native country - the native language "," Ukrainian language - to live ". On the main street of the country from about 600 candles the call "Feel the taste of the Ukrainian language" was laid out.

== Celebration in 2015 ==
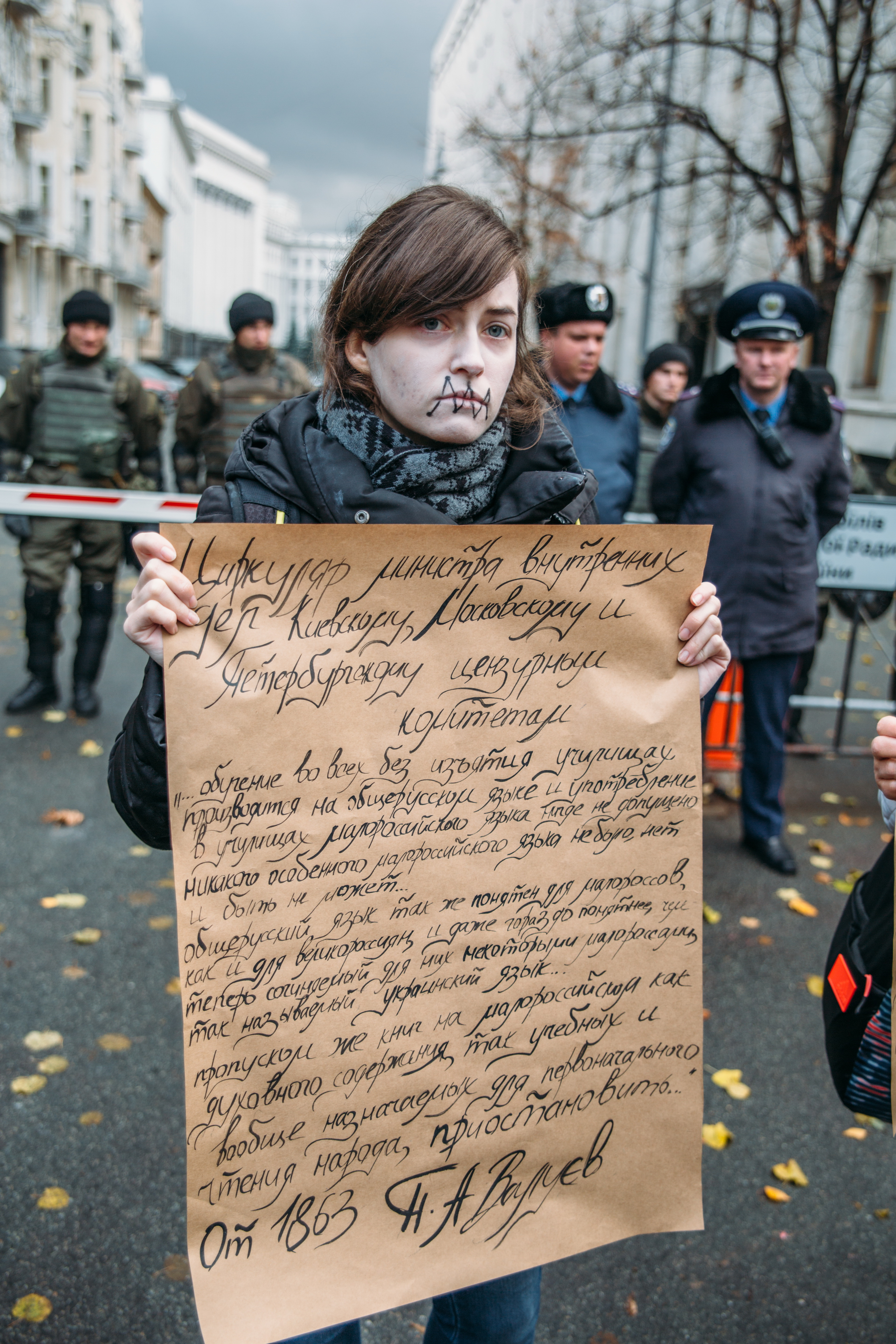
A girl with a "stitched mouth" holds an imitation of the Valuev Circular during a theatrical performance against the Russification of Ukraine.

In 2015, near the Presidential Administration of Ukraine, the civic movement Vidsich held a theatrical protest demanding the protection and support of the Ukrainian language. The purpose of the event was to urge the authorities at that time to legislate support for the Ukrainian language in the context of the beginning of Russia’s war against Ukraine.

The characters of the performance were well-known Russian historical figures who, in the opinion of the participants, had played a role in the Russification of Ukraine: Pyotr Valuev, Catherine the Great, Peter I, Anna Ioannovna, and Joseph Stalin. Behind each character, an activist with a “sewn-up mouth” held an imitation of one of their historical documents, which testified to their anti-Ukrainian policies. One after another, these characters sarcastically thanked the then Ukrainian government, and above all President Petro Poroshenko, for continuing their cause. In this way, the organizers sought to show that the Russification of Ukraine was still ongoing. Protesters insisted that the revival of the Ukrainian language was a matter of national security and citizens’ well-being.

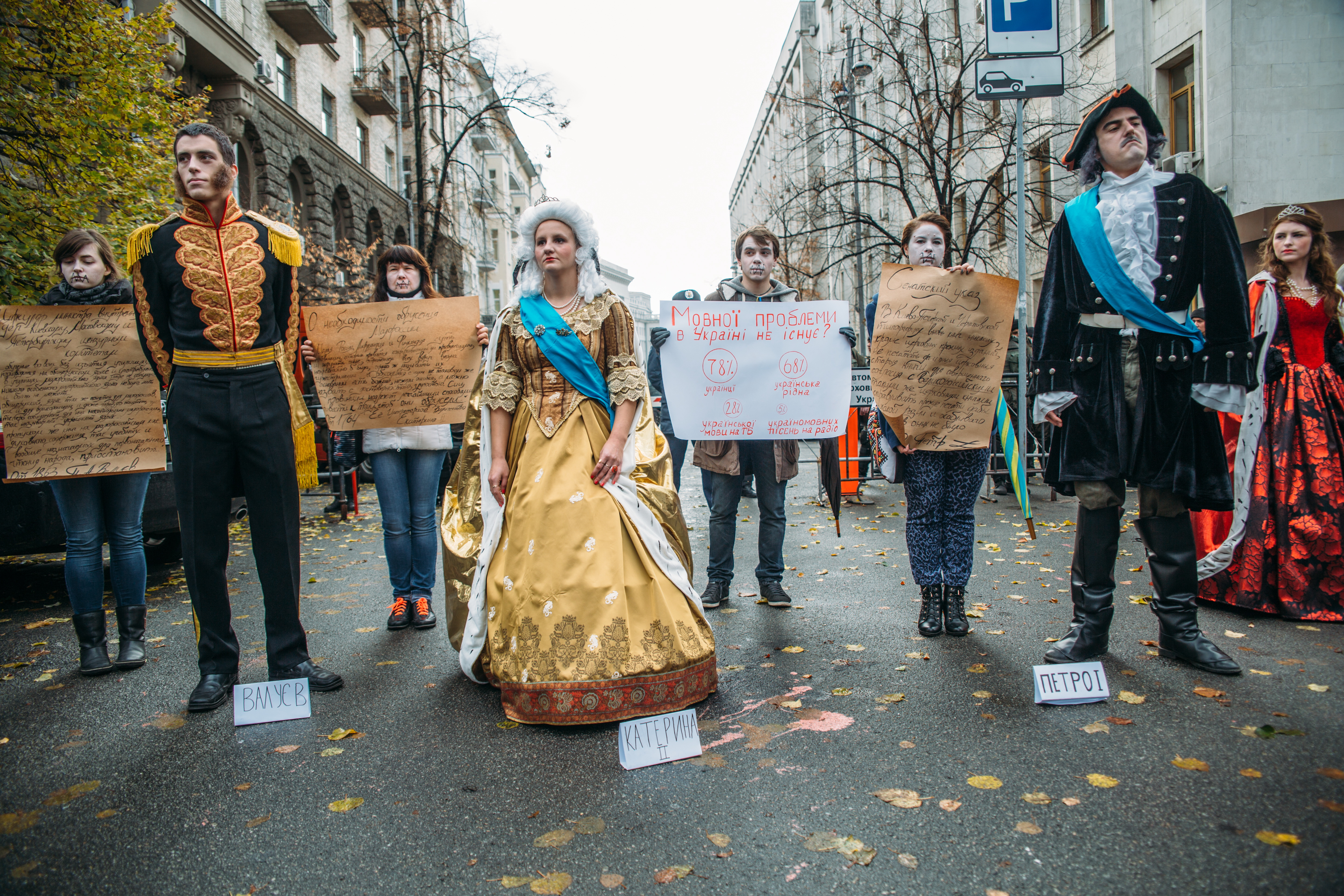
The action against Russification took place on Bankova Street

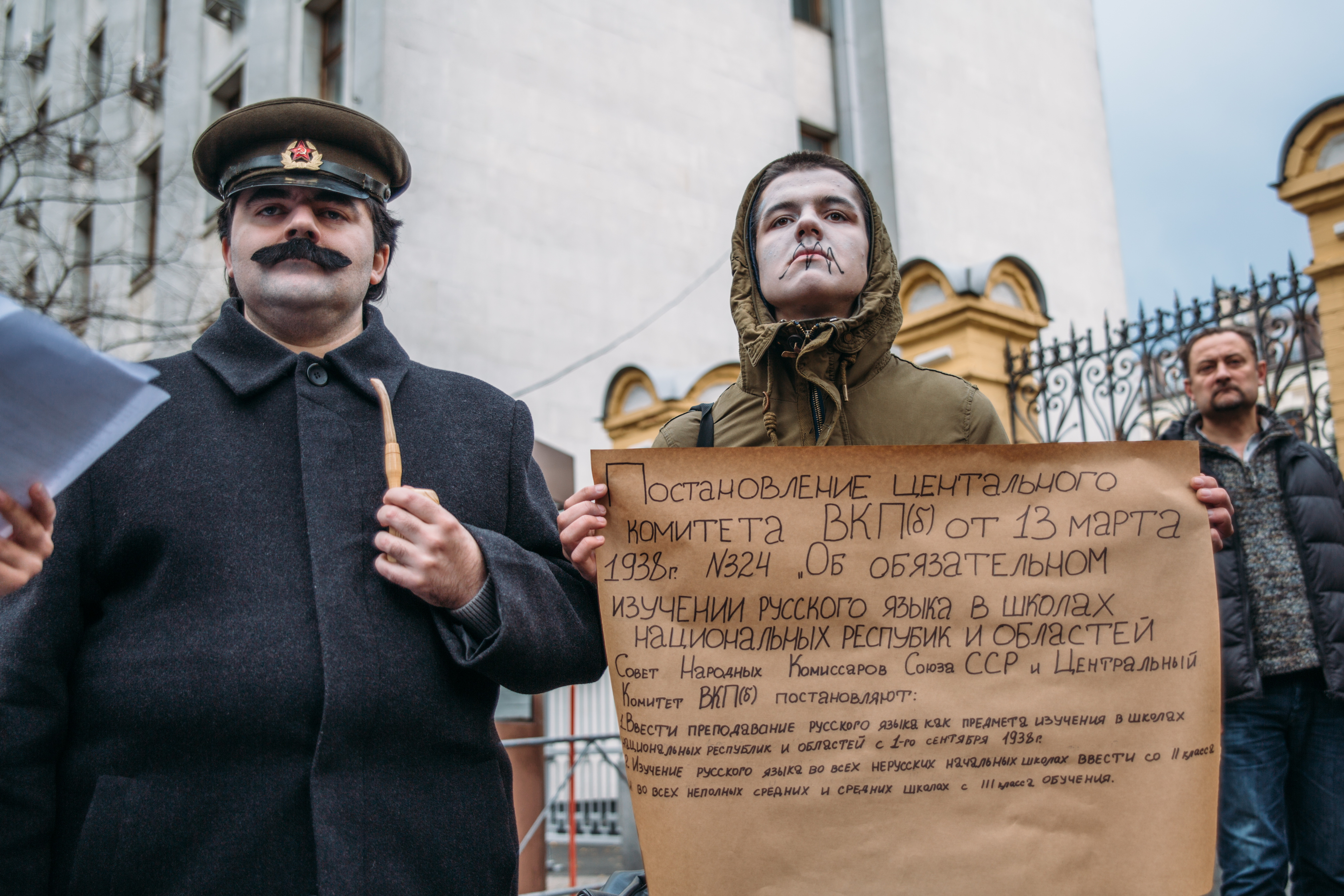
Character Joseph Stalin

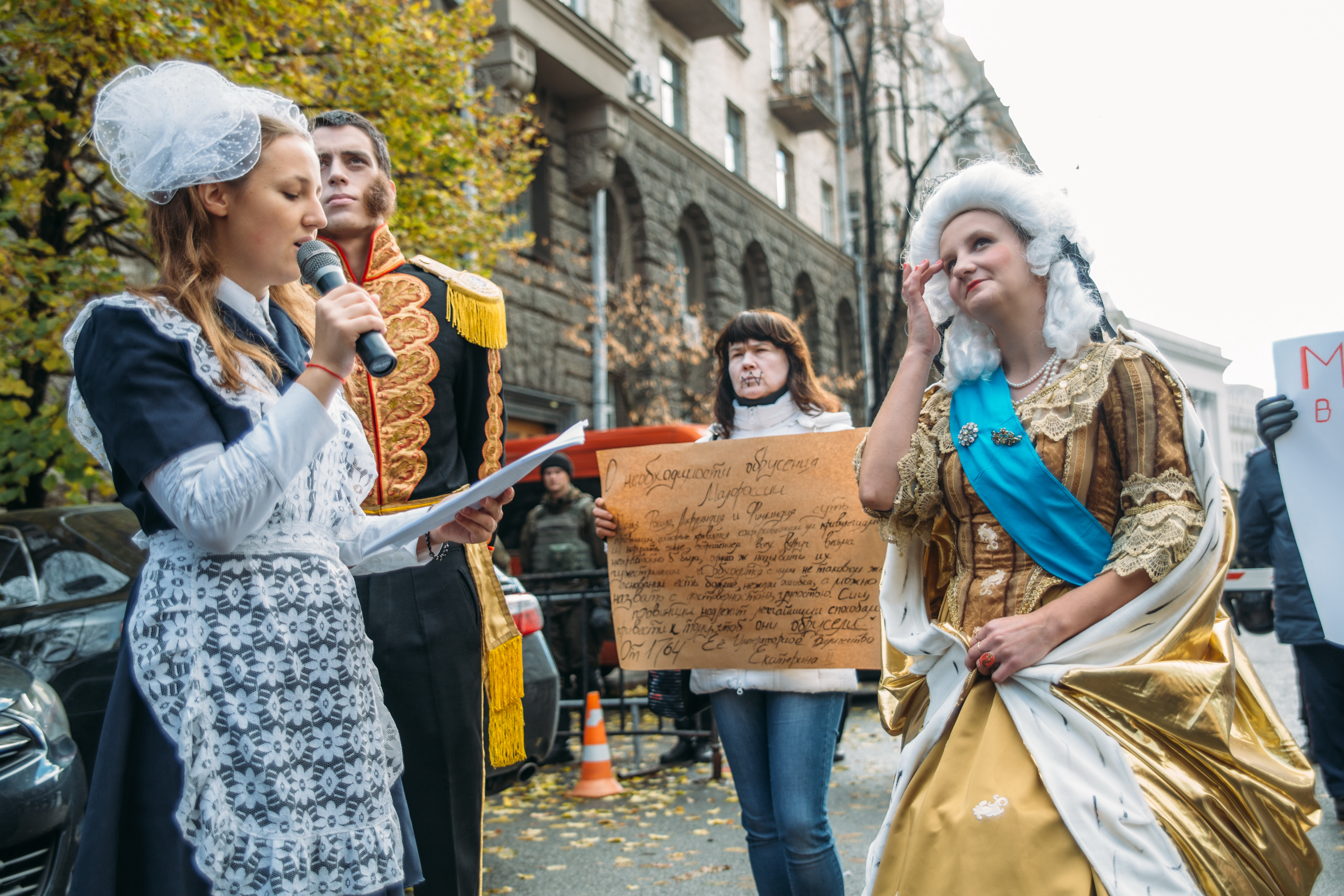
Catherine the Great

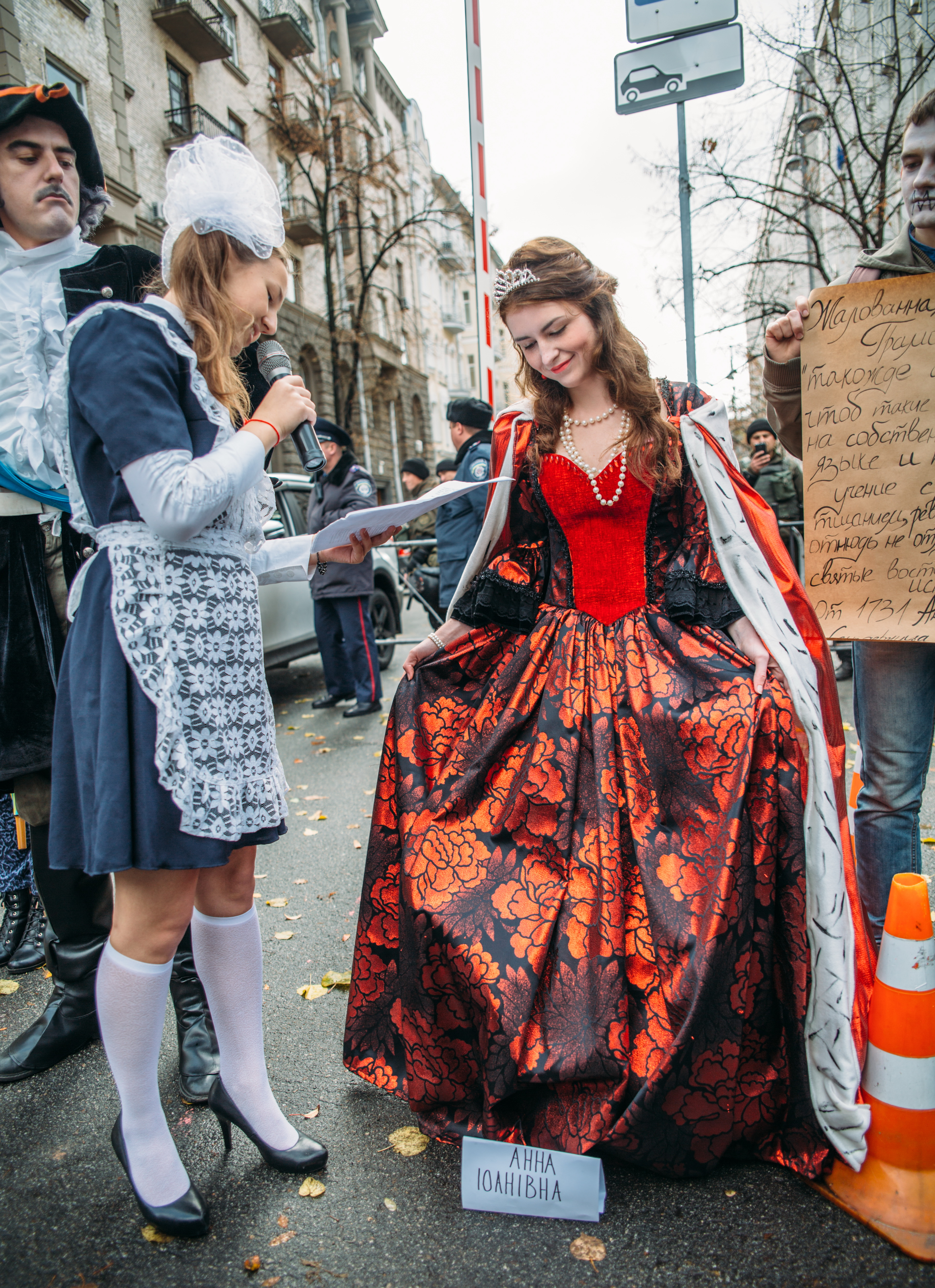
Anna Ioannovna

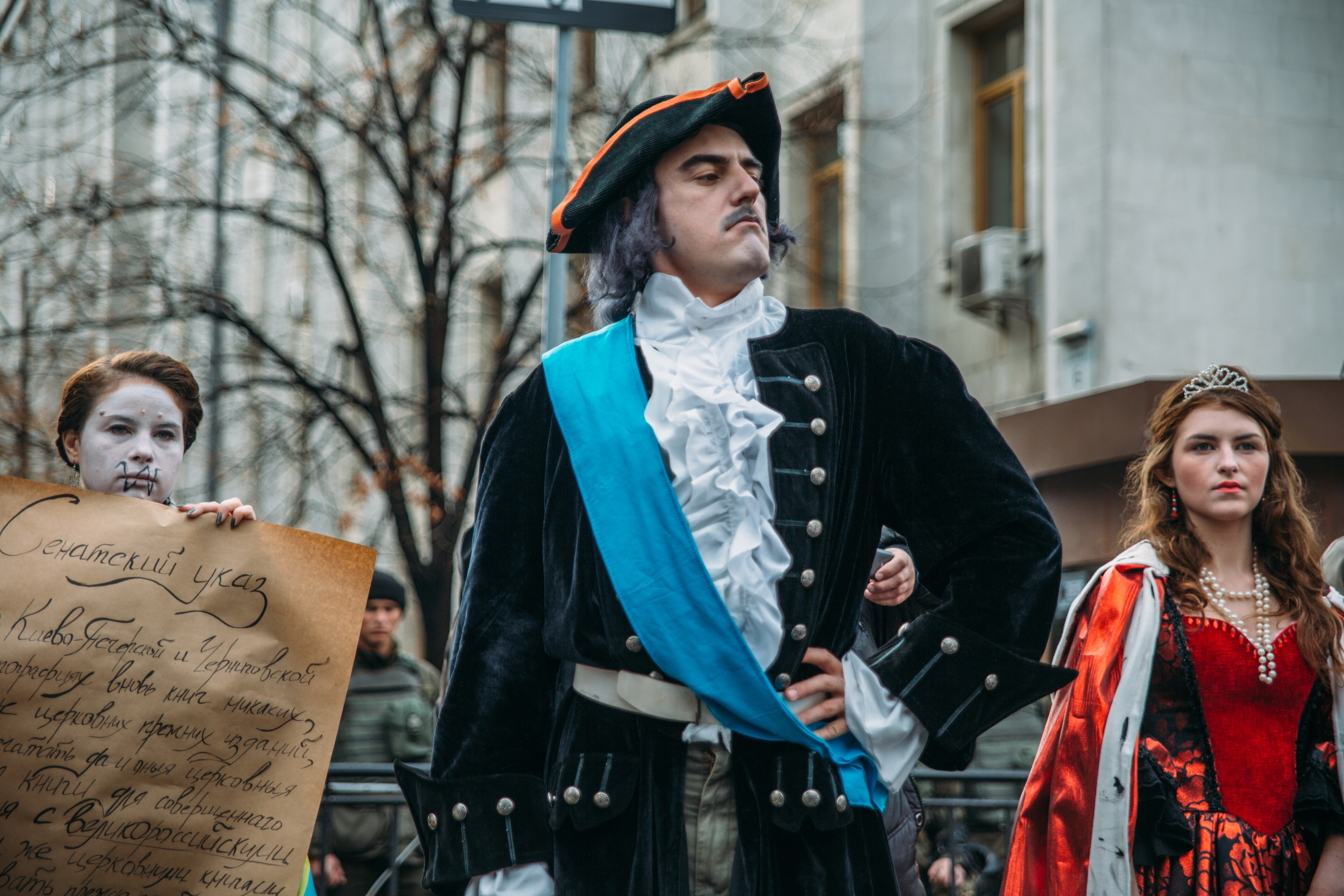
Peter I depicted during the performance

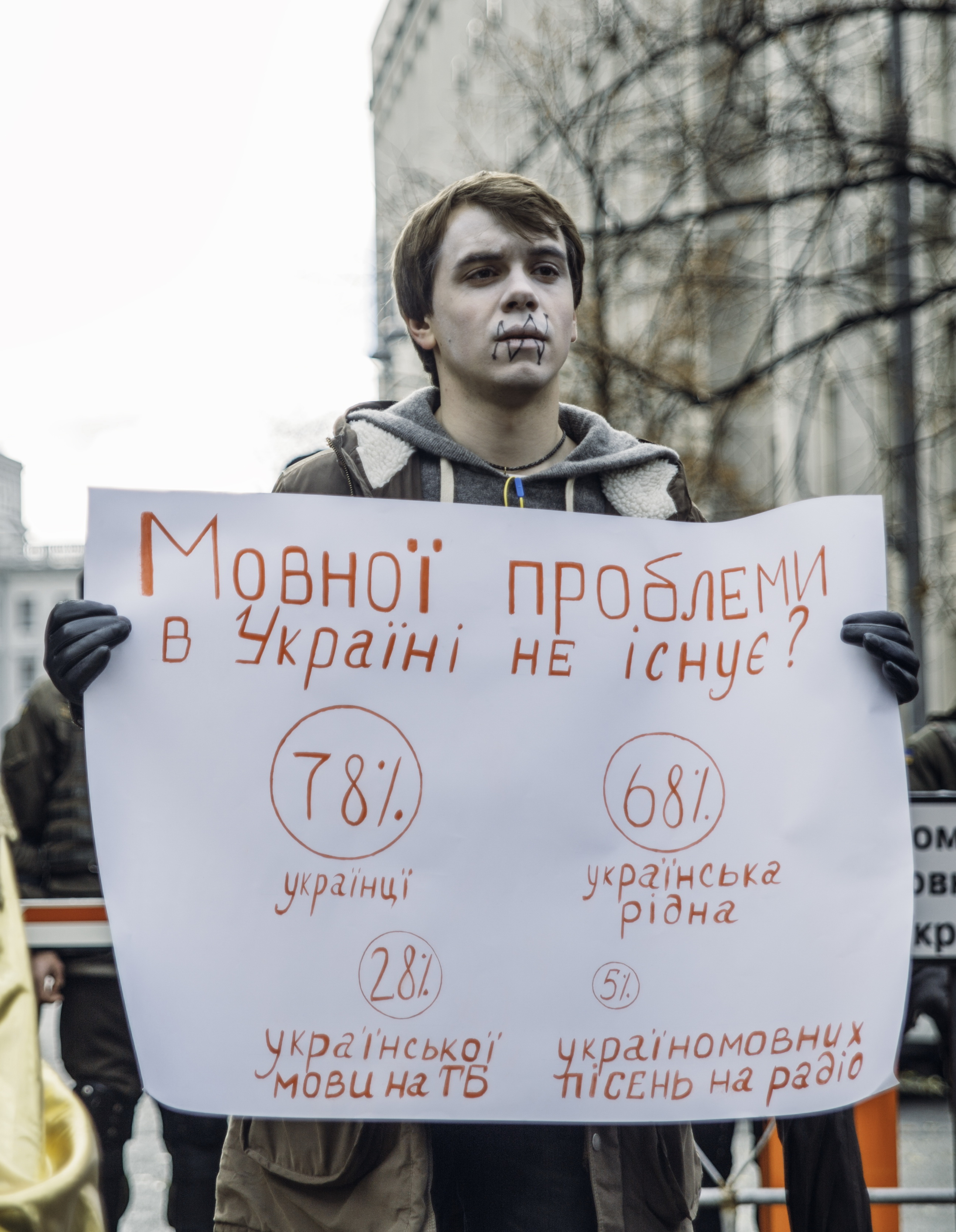
Infographics about the share of Ukrainian language on TV and radio at the anti-Russification action

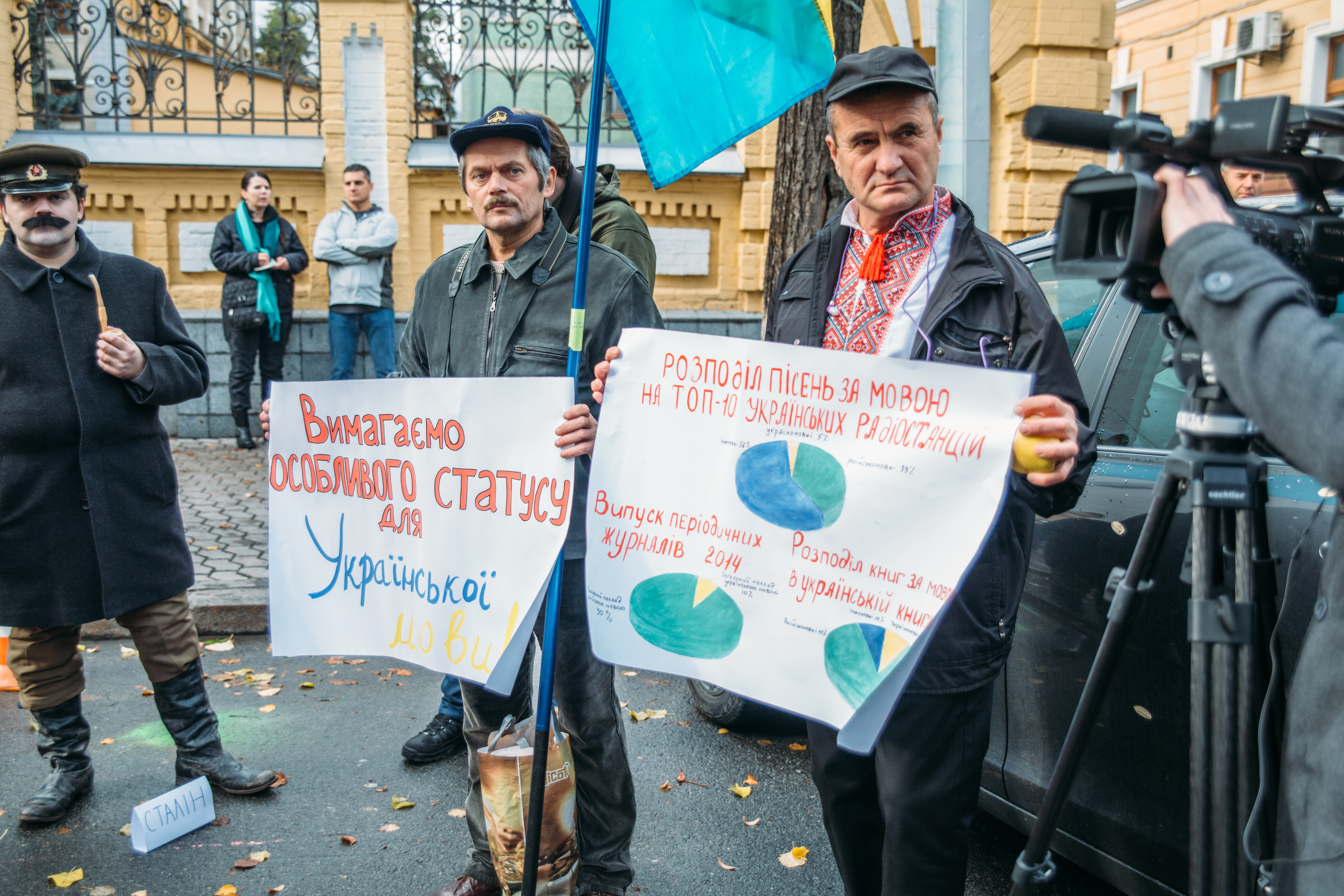
The man on the right holds a poster with graphs showing the small share of the Ukrainian language in the field of book printing, on the radio, and in magazine publishing in Ukraine

== Change of date ==
On July 28, 2023, President of Ukraine Volodymyr Zelenskyy signed a decree changing the celebration date from November 9 to October 27. The change was made due to the transition of the Orthodox Church of Ukraine and the Ukrainian Greek Catholic Church to the Revised Julian calendar.

The Orthodox Church of Ukraine explained its decision as follows:

“This issue arose with new urgency as a result of Russian aggression. Today, the Julian calendar is perceived as connected with Russian church culture. After all, the modern (Revised Julian) calendar is used by those Churches that support our Local Church, while opponents, primarily the Russian Orthodox Church, adhere to the old Julian calendar. Therefore, the aspiration to preserve and affirm our Ukrainian spiritual identity, as well as to protect against the aggression of the ‘Russian world,’ requires us to take a long-overdue step — to join the majority of Local Orthodox Churches and introduce the Revised Julian calendar into use.”

== See also ==
- International Mother Language Day
- European Day of Languages
