= Nikolay Maklakov =

Russian statesman (1871–1918)

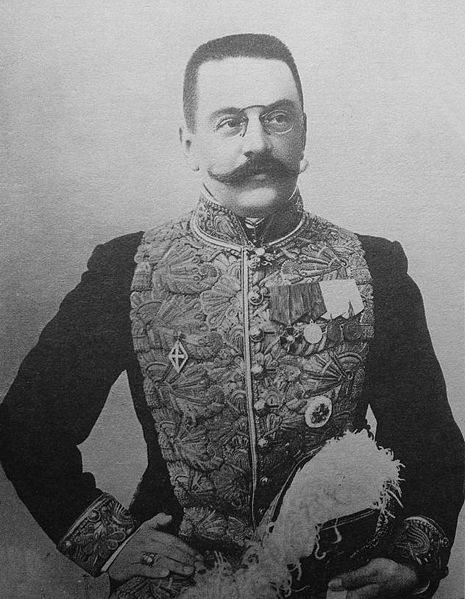
Maklakov in 1914, photo by Karl Bulla

Nikolay Alexeyevich Maklakov (21 September [O.S. 9 September] 1871 – 5 September 1918) was a Russian statesman who served as the interior minister from 16 December 1912 to 5 June 1915. He was also the chamberlain of the emperor's court, the governor of Chernigov, and a state councillor. His older brother, Vasily Maklakov, was a prominent lawyer and liberal deputy in the State Duma (Russian Empire); his younger brother was an ophthalmologist.

== Biography ==
Nikolay was the son of an eye doctor in Moscow. He graduated from the historical-philological faculty of Imperial Moscow University (1893). The following year, he started to work for the Ministry of Finance. In 1893 he married Princess Marie L. Obolensky (30 April 1874, Moscow - 25 September 1949, Menen).

On 7 June 1909 he was appointed acting Governor of Chernigov. The Emperor appointed him on 16 December 1912 as manager in the Ministry of Internal Affairs. The appointment took place, despite the stubborn resistance of the chairman of the Russian Council of Ministers Vladimir Kokovtsov, who, not without reason, feared that Maklakov, closely associated with influential right-wing of prince Vladimir Meshchersky, would prevent the government's liberal policies. He was a member of the Union of the Russian People and friendly with Vladimir Dzhunkovsky.

On 21 February 1913, Nikolay Maklakov was appointed as Minister of Interior. In his new position, Maklakov actively supported the monarchist movement. His reaction to the Siberian goldfield strike, ending in the Lena massacre, and believed to have made revolutionary feeling widespread in Russia for the first time, was "So it was. So it will be." Like his brother the lawyer he was involved in the Beilis case but on the opposite side.

Nikolay Maklakov prohibited the celebration of the poet Taras Shevchenko. The Minister pushed through the legislative establishment of 150 bills, including on the transformation of the police, the press, the zemstvo, on the transformation of the statistical section of the Ministry, and the second General census of the population.

In May 1915, the anti-German mood in Moscow reached a provisional high point. In June, Maklakov was forced to resign accused of supporting a peace with Germany. In December 1916, he appealed with a letter to the Tsar, in which he persuaded him to adopt a more rigid course, and to delay the resumption of sessions of the Duma to a later period. Maklakov was one of the few dignitaries, taken on the eve of the February 1917 real steps to prevent the revolution. The Emperor instructed Maklakov and Alexander Protopopov on 8 February 1917 to prepare a Manifesto on the dissolution of the Imperial State Duma. On 28 February, Maklakov was arrested, and almost torn to pieces when he was taken to prison. He remained in Kresty prison, occasionally leaving for hospital visits, until he was executed by firing squad in a public ceremony at Moscow’s Petrovsky Park. His younger brother Alexey disappeared in the same year. His children, including Yuri Nikolayevich Maklakov, escaped or fled to their uncle Vasily in Paris and participated in the White army.
