= Campenhausen =

Baltic-German and Swedish noble family

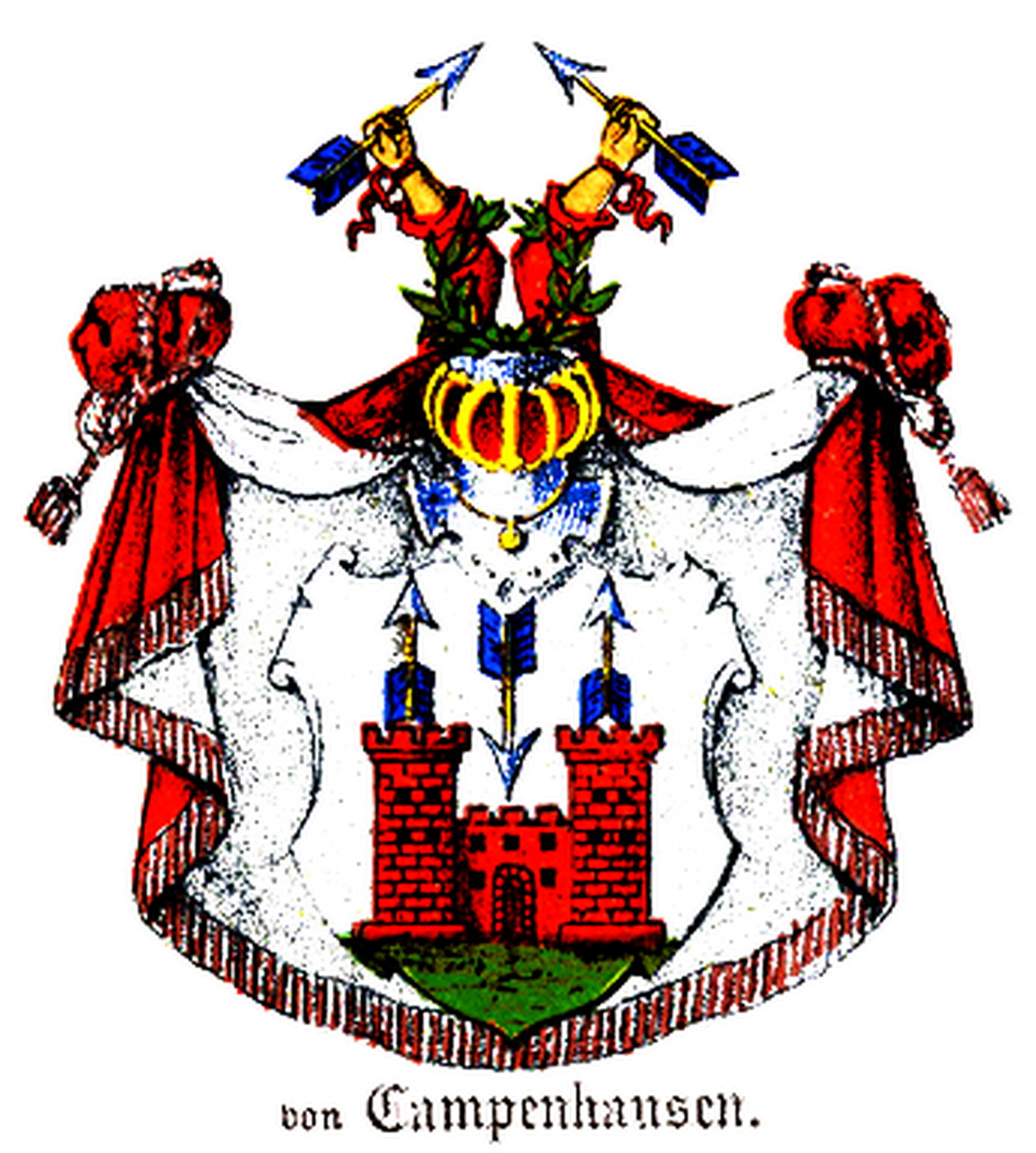
Ancestral coat of arms of Campenhausen family

The Campenhausen family or von Campenhausen (Camphusen, Camphus, Kamphaus, Camphuis, Kamphuis; Кампенгаузен) is a Baltic-German and Swedish noble family descending from Spanish Netherlands. Members of the family occupied many important positions within Russian Empire, Sweden, Poland and Germany.

== Notable members ==
- Axel Freiherr von Campenhausen (born 1934), German canon lawyer
- Balthasar Freiherr von Campenhausen (1689–1758), Russian lieutenant general, participant of the Great Northern War and General-Governor of Finland in 1741–1743.
- Balthasar von Campenhausen (1745–1800), Russian statesman
- Balthasar von Campenhausen (1772–1823), Baron, Balthasar Freiherr von Campenhausen and Saaremaa, Mayor of Taganrog, Russian statesman, Privy Councilor, chamberlain.
- Hans von Campenhausen (1903–1989), German theologist
- Johann Camphusen (?–1512), Mayor of Riga
- Johann Christoph von Campenhausen (1716–1782),
- Johannes Freiherr von Campenhausen (born 1935), German politician, former leader of German Party.
- Johann Hermann von Campenhausen (1641–1705), Swedish militarian, engineer of Tallinn fortifications
- Leyon Pierce Balthasar von Campenhausen (1746–1807), poet, playwright and publicist
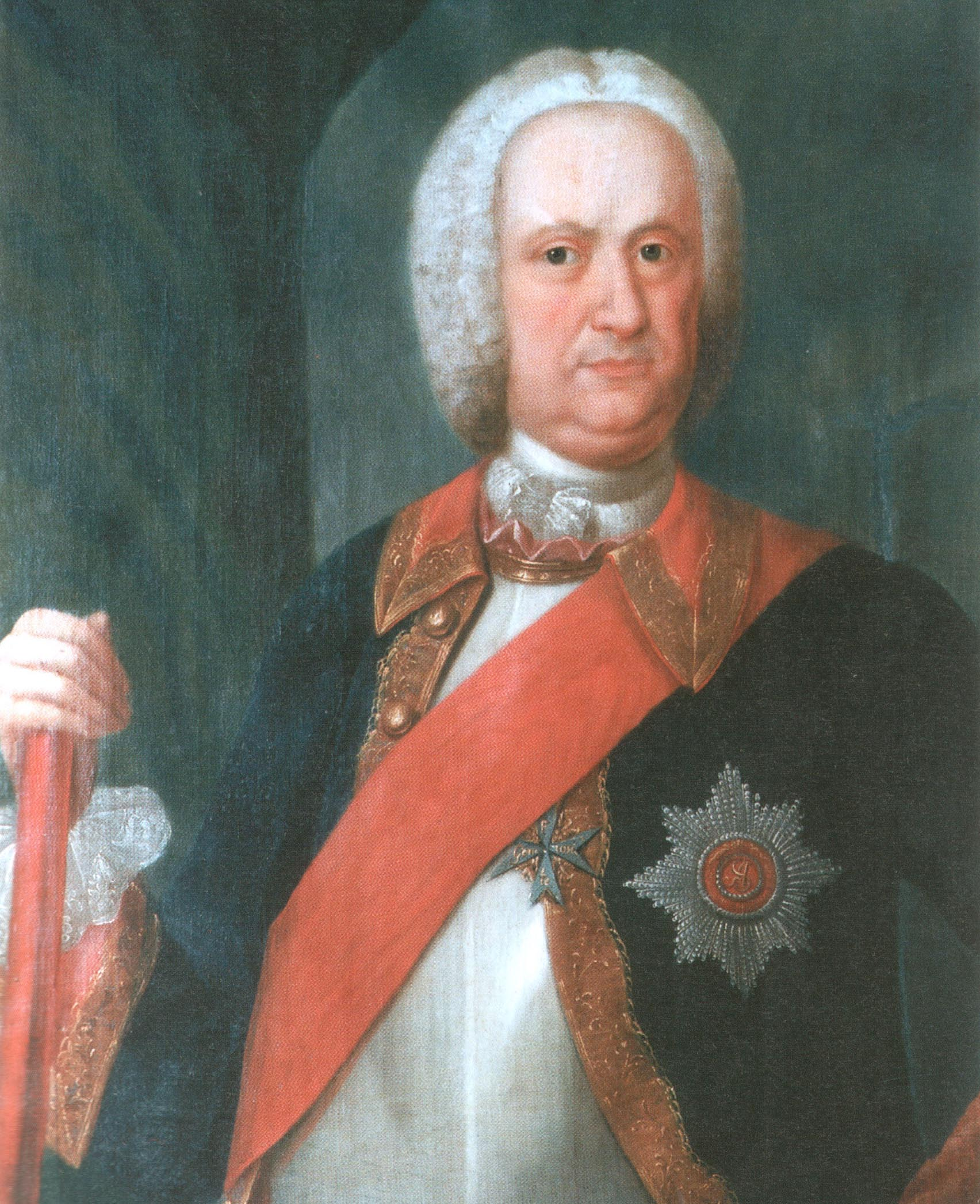
Russian lieutenant general Balthasar Freiherr von Campenhausen

== See also ==
- List of Swedish noble families
