= Vasily Lanskoy =

Russian politician

Vasily Sergeyevich Lanskoy
- Васи́лий Серге́евич Ланско́й
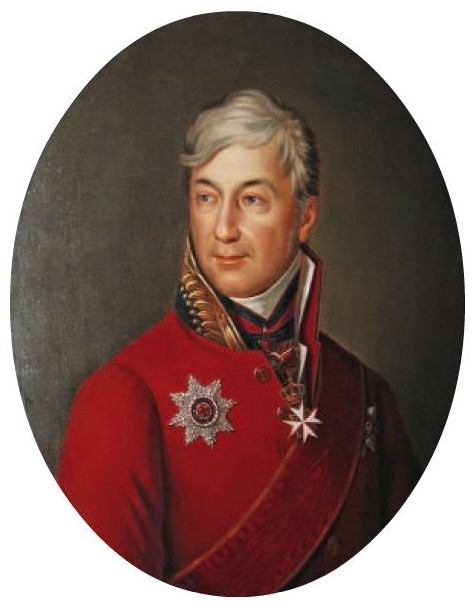

Minister of Interior
- In office August 1823 – April 1828
- Preceded by: Baltazar Kampengauzen
- Succeeded by: Arseniy Zakrevskiy

Personal details
- Born: 1754
- Died: 1831 (aged 76–77)

Vasily Sergeyevich Lanskoy (Russian: Васи́лий Серге́евич Ланско́й) (1754–1831) was a Russian statesman, politician, and Minister of the Interior from August 29 of 1823 to April 19 of 1828.

Political offices
Preceded by Baltazar Kampengauzen	Minister of Interior; August 1823 – April 1828	Succeeded by Arseniy Zakrevskiy
