= Sergey Stepanovich Lanskoy =

Russian politician (1788–1862)

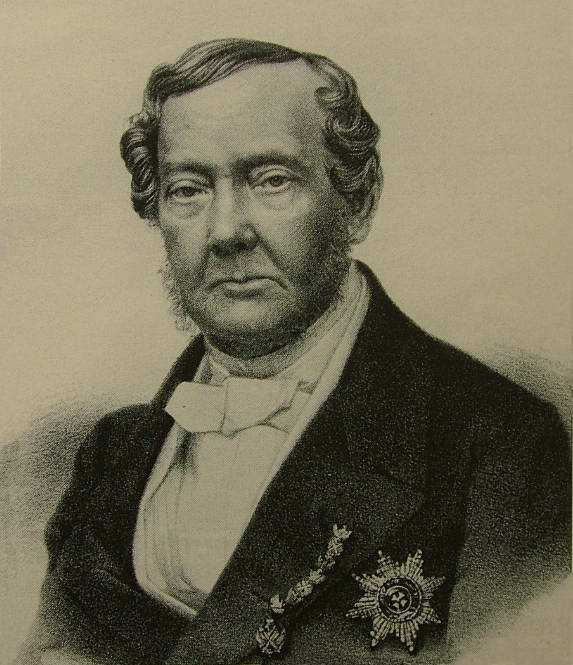
Lithograph, 1864–1869

Sergey Stepanovich Lanskoy (Russian: Серге́й Степа́нович Ланско́й; 3 January 1788 [O.S. 23 December 1787] - 7 February [O.S. 26 January] 1862) was a Russian politician who served as the minister of the interior from 1855 to 1861, being inaugurated during a reform-minded era and dismissed after the emancipation reform of 1861. He is known for being close friends with Nikolay Milyutin, who drafted the Russian Emancipation proclamation, and with his brother, Dmitry Milyutin, who was serving as the minister of war.

== Political career ==
In 1810, Lanskoy had joined a Freemason lodge and held important positions until the closing decree of 1822. After this, he was a member of the Union of Prosperity but was out of it by the disturbances of 1825. His last known secret organization was the Theoretical Degree of the Order of the Golden-Rose Cross, which also remained clandestine throughout his life. He was known particularly for being with the Freemasons and for being "with the Brothers" (the Milyutins) in Russian society. In this regard, he has also been connected multiple times with Leo Tolstoy and other Russian Liberals and Constitutionalists who had been involved in Masonic lodges.

Around 1852, Lanskoy had been involved with the reformation of the Russian prison system. He had rejected donations to the prison system for prisoners until prisoner committees could be established. He finally gave into the plan for a Krasnoyarsk Prisoners Society to serve this purpose.

In 1855, Lanskoy was behind an initiative to tell Europe about Russia in liberal and progressive hues, establishing Le Nord as a newspaper in Belgium to give air to these views.

During a meeting in 1856, Lanskoy tried to persuade a group of nobles to voluntarily abolish serfdom, because "it would be in their interests to grant the serfs emancipation before the peasants rebelled", which is what eventually happened.

When Dmitry Milyutin finally authored the Emancipation Proclamation for Russian serfs in 1861, just a year before Lanskoy's death, Lanksoy's place was considered important. Being born in the 1700s and having a prestigious military career, he "was the only representative of an earlier generation of Russian civil servants".

== Sources ==
- "Ланской, Сергей Степанович" . Brockhaus and Efron Encyclopedic Dictionary (in Russian). 1906.
