= Lobanovo =

Lobanovo may refer to:

- Lobanove, village in Crimea
- Lobanovo, Russia, several rural localities in Russia
- Lobanovo, Kazakhstan, a village in Aiyrtau District, North Kazakhstan Region

== See also ==
- Lobanov
