= Lobanovo, Russia =

Lobanovo (Russian: Лобаново) is the name of several rural localities in Russia:

- Lobanovo, Perm Krai, a selo and the administrative center of Lobanovskoye Rural Settlement, Permsky District, Perm Krai
- Lobanovo, Gus-Khrustalny District, Vladimir Oblast, a village in Posyolok Krasnoye Ekho, Gus-Khrustalny District, Vladimir Oblast
- Lobanovo, Selivanovsky District, Vladimir Oblast, a village in Novlyanskoye Rural Settlement, Selivanovsky District, Vladimir Oblast
- Lobanovo, Sudogodsky District, Vladimir Oblast, a village in Lavrovskoye Rural Settlement, Sudogodsky District, Vladimir Oblast
- Lobanovo, Kichmengsko-Gorodetsky District, Vologda Oblast, a village in Kichmegnskoye Rural Settlement, Kichmengsko-Gorodetsky District, Vologda Oblast
