= Lobanov-Rostovsky =

Lobanov-Rostovsky (Russian: Лобанов-Ростовский), feminine: Lobanova-Rostovskaya (Лобанова-Ростовская) is a Russian surname of noble origin, associated with the House of Lobanov-Rostovsky. Notable people with the surname include:

- Aleksandr Lobanov-Rostovsky, multiple persons
- Aleksey Lobanov-Rostovsky (1824–1896), Russian statesman and diplomat
- Andrey Lobanov-Rostovsky (1892–1979), Russian officer and American historian
- Dmitry Lobanov-Rostovsky (1758–1838), Russian general and statesman
- Esperanza de Sarachaga, or Esperanza Felicitas Alexandra de Sarachaga y Lobanov Rostovsky, 19th-century courtier and socialite of Spanish and Russian descent
- Mariya Naryshkina, born princess Lobanov-Rostovsky (1789–1854), decorated lady-in-waiting, daughter of Yakov Lobanov-Rostovsky
- Nikita Dmitrievich Lobanov-Rostovsky or Nikita Lobanov
- Nikita Ivanovich Lobanov-Rostovsky (died 1658), Russian nobleman
- Semyon Lobanov-Rostovsky (died after 1597), Russian nobleman and military leader
- Yakov Lobanov-Rostovsky, multiple persons

== See also ==
- Lobanov
- Rostovsky (disambiguation)
- Lobanov-Rostovsky Palace
