= Alexander Lobanov =

Alexander Lobanov may refer to:

- Alexander Lobanov (artist) (1924–2003), Russian outsider artist
- Alexander Lobanov (serial killer) (1979–2002), Russian serial killer
- Aleksandr Lobanov (born 1986), Uzbekistani footballer
