= Lobanov =

Lobanov (Russian: Лобанов) is a Russian masculine surname, its feminine counterpart is Lobanova. It may refer to:

- Alexander Lobanov (artist) (1924–2003), Russian outsider artist
- Alexander Lobanov (footballer) (born 1986), Uzbekistani football goalkeeper
- Alexander Lobanov (serial killer) (1979–2002), Russian serial killer and rapist
- Andrey Lobanov (born 1972), Kazakhstani archer
- Dmitri Lobanov (born 1990), Russian football player
- Evgeny Lobanov (born 1984), Russian ice hockey goaltender
- Igor Lobanov (born 1969), Russian Olympic luger and rock musician
- Liliya Lobanova (born 1985), Ukrainian runner
- Mikhail Lobanov (born 1984), Russian mathematician and left-wing politician
- Nikita Lobanov (art collector) (born 1935), Russian art collector
- Nataliya Kuznetsova-Lobanova (1947–1998), Russian diver
- Sergei Lobanov (born 1984), Russian football player
- Sergei Lobanov (born 2001), Russian chess player
- Valentīns Lobaņovs (born 1971), Latvian football midfielder
- Vasily Lobanov (born 1947), Russian composer and pianist
- Vladimir Lobanov (1953–2007), Russian speed skater
- Yuri Lobanov (1952–2017), Tajik sprint canoer

== See also ==
- Lobanov-Rostovsky family
- Lobanov-Rostovsky
