= Vasily Maklakov =

Russian lawyer and politician (1869–1957)

- Васи́лий Маклако́в
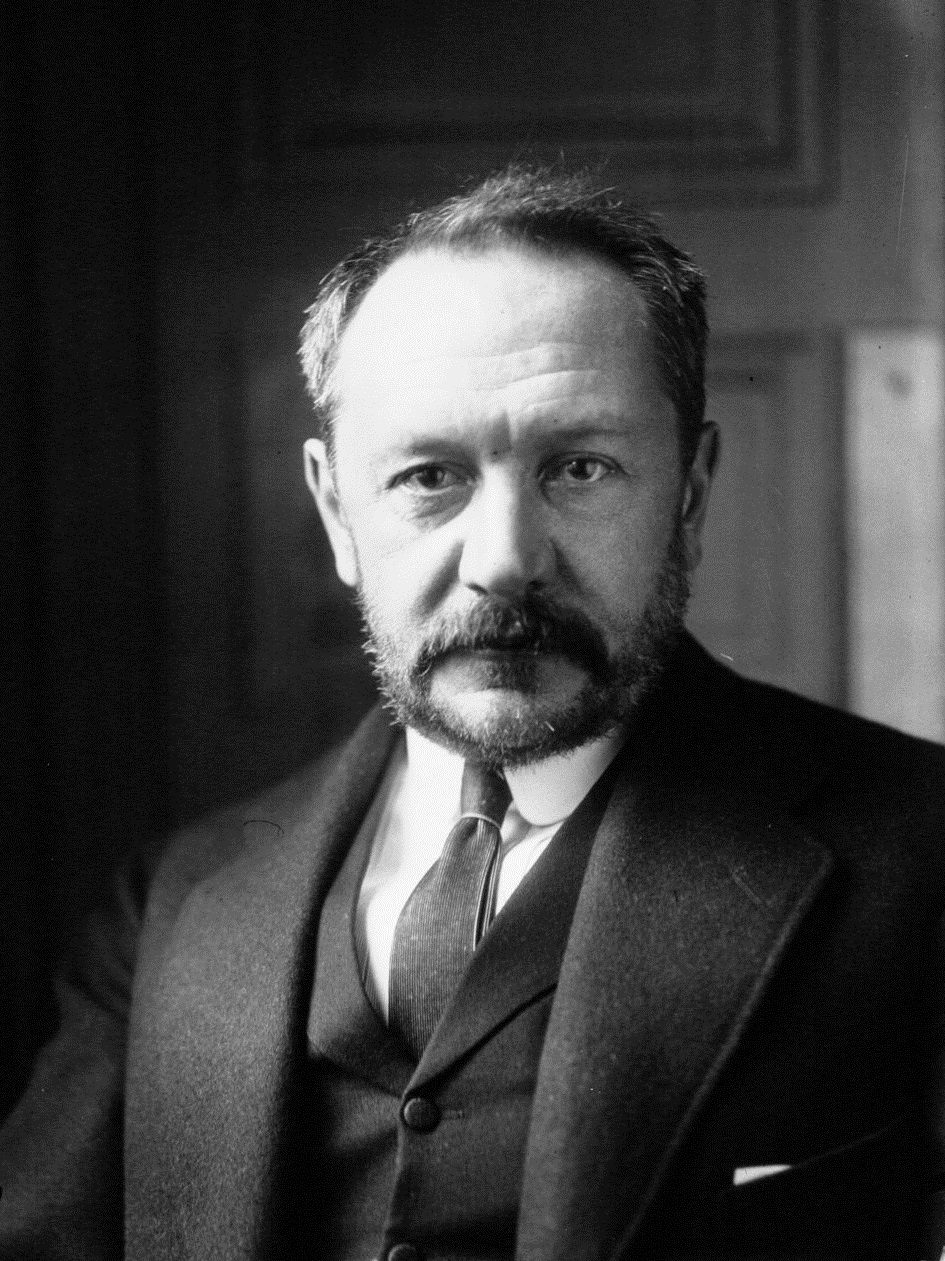
- Maklakov in 1917 as Ambassador to France

Ambassador of the Russian Provisional Government to France
- In office 11 October 1917 (Note: Approximately.) – 26 October 1917 (Note: Dismissed by the Bolsheviks, retained semi-diplomatic status until France recognized the Soviet Union in 1924.)
- Prime Minister: Alexander Kerensky
- Preceded by: Alexander Izvolsky
- Succeeded by: Office abolished (Note: Leonid Krasin as Ambassador of the Soviet Union to France.)

Chairman of the Legal Conference of the Russian Provisional Government
- In office 8 March 1917 – 20 March 1917
- Prime Minister: Georgy Lvov
- Preceded by: Office established
- Succeeded by: Fyodor Kokoshkin

Commissar for Justice of the Provisional Committee of the State Duma
- In office 27 February 1917 – 2 March 1917
- Chairman: Mikhail Rodzianko
- Preceded by: Office established (Note: Nikolay Dobrovolsky as Minister of Justice of the Russian Empire.)
- Succeeded by: Office abolished (Note: Alexander Kerensky as Minister of Justice of the Russian Provisional Government.)

Member of the Russian Constituent Assembly
- In office 25 November 1917 – 20 January 1918 (Note: The Constituent Assembly was declared dissolved by the Bolshevik-Left SR Soviet government, rendering the end the term served.)
- Preceded by: Constituency established
- Succeeded by: Constituency abolished
- Constituency: Moscow Metropolis

Member of the Moscow City Duma
- In office 25 June 1917 – 8 January 1918
- Preceded by: Constituency established
- Succeeded by: Constituency abolished
- Constituency: Prechistensko-Arbatsky District

Member of the Russian State Duma
- In office 20 February 1907 – 6 October 1917
- Preceded by: Multi-member district
- Succeeded by: Constituency abolished
- Constituency: Arbat District

Personal details
- Born: 22 May [O.S. 10 May] 1869 Moscow, Russian Empire
- Died: 15 July 1957 (aged 88) Baden, Switzerland
- Resting place: Sainte-Geneviève-des-Bois Russian Cemetery
- Citizenship: Russian Empire (1869–1917); France (1917–1957)
- Party: Constitutional Democratic Party
- Other political affiliations: Union of Liberation
- Parents: A. N. Maklakov (father); Elizaveta Vasilievna (mother)
- Relatives: Nikolay Maklakov (brother); Alexey Maklakov (brother); Olga Maklakov (sister); Maria Maklakov (sister)
- Education: Imperial Moscow University
- Known for: Co-founder of the Constitutional Democratic Party

Vasily Alekseyevich Maklakov (Russian: Васи́лий Алексе́евич Маклако́в; 22 May [O.S. 10 May] 1869 – July 15, 1957) was a Russian student activist, a trial lawyer and liberal parliamentary deputy, an orator, and one of the leaders of the Constitutional Democratic Party, notable for his advocacy of a constitutional Russian state. He served as deputy in the (radical) Second, and conservative Third and Fourth State Duma (Russian Empire). According to Stephen F. Williams Maklakov is "an inviting lens to which to view at the last years of Tsarism".

In February 1917 Maklakov was appointed as commissar in the Provisional Committee of the State Duma. In October 1917 he was sent to Paris as ambassador, but by the time he arrived there, the Russian Provisional Government no longer existed. He subsequently went on to organize the activities of Russian émigrés.

== Imperial Russia ==
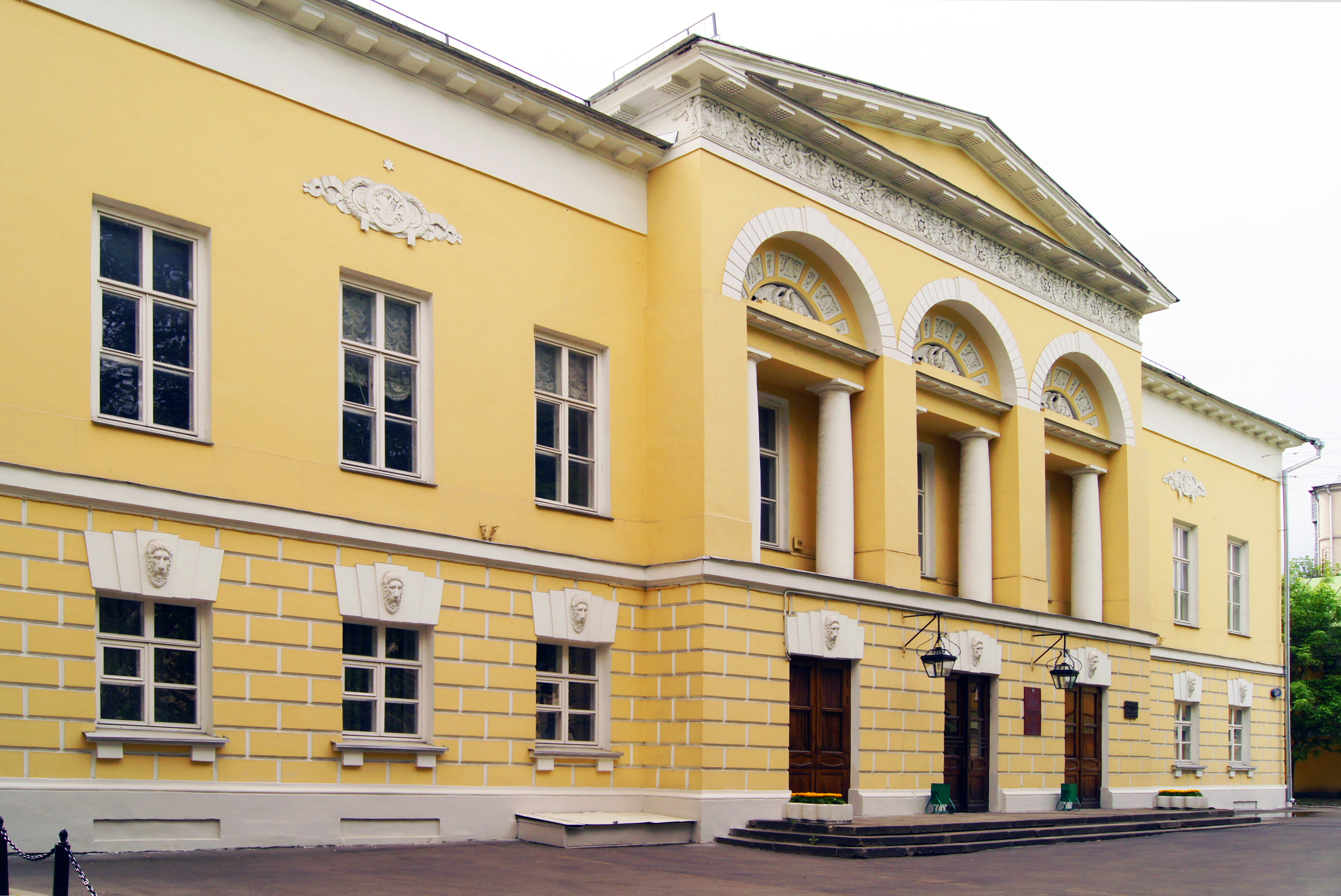
The former Gagarin mansion, then the fifth Gymnasium

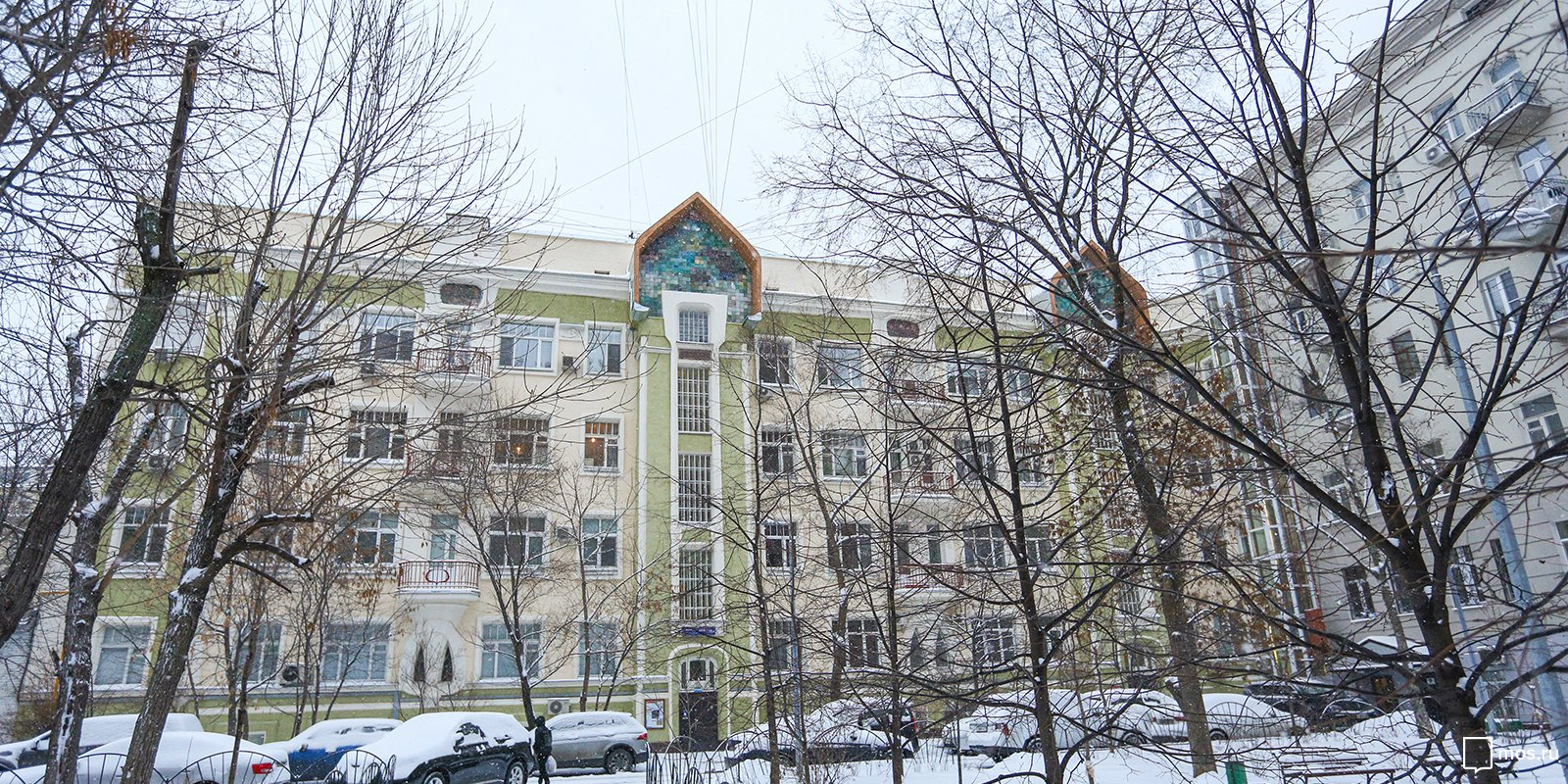
Plevako's apartment building

Vasily, or Basil, was the son of Alexey Nikolaevich Maklakov (1837 – May 1895), a Moscow ophthalmology professor, the inventor of ocular tonometry, a member of the zemstvo and the Moscow City Duma. His mother came from a noble and wealthy family, spoke three foreign languages, and played the piano. She had seven children and died when he was 11 years old. Vasily had a full-time governess, and he and his siblings learned to speak French fluently. He was interested in organic chemistry and bought a Bunsen burner. He studied mathematics and physics after he left the 5th Moscow Gymnasium in 1887. He was impressed by French political life and influenced by Count Mirabeau. During a visit to the famous World's fair in Paris with his father, French students took him to election meetings and introduced him to candidates.

Back home, Maklakov published an account of the "Paris Student Association" in Russkiye Vedomosti. Like Lenin and Ayn Rand, he was influenced by the death of Nikolay Chernyshevsky, a victim of injustice. In 1890, he raised money for the poor with concerts; he was arrested for his participation in the student movement and expelled from the university "for political unreliability". He spent five days in the Butyrka prison. Then, he went back to Paris with his stepmother, the author of children books, and he met with the anarchists and geographers Léon Metchnikoff and Reclus. Back home, Vasily organized a student economic commission and held his first political speech. He met with Leo Tolstoy and began to appear in newspapers, mainly because of the Russian famine of 1891–1892. In 1894, he joined the army in Rostow as a volunteer.

After his father had a talk about his son with the Director of Police Pyotr Durnovo, the trustee P.A. Kapnist suggested for Vasily to change faculties and to study history. Maklakov was seen as "a man of outstanding intelligence". After the ban was lifted, he graduated under Paul Vinogradoff, an eminent scholar and researcher of classical antiquity at Imperial Moscow University. Maklakov was offered to stay to prepare for the professorship but this was opposed. He then decided to choose for advocacy and graduated from the law faculty. His thesis was dedicated to "The impact of dependent land ownership on civil legal capacity at the end of the Carolingian period". After the death of their father, the brothers inherited Dergaykovo-estate near New Jerusalem Monastery.

=== Lawyer ===
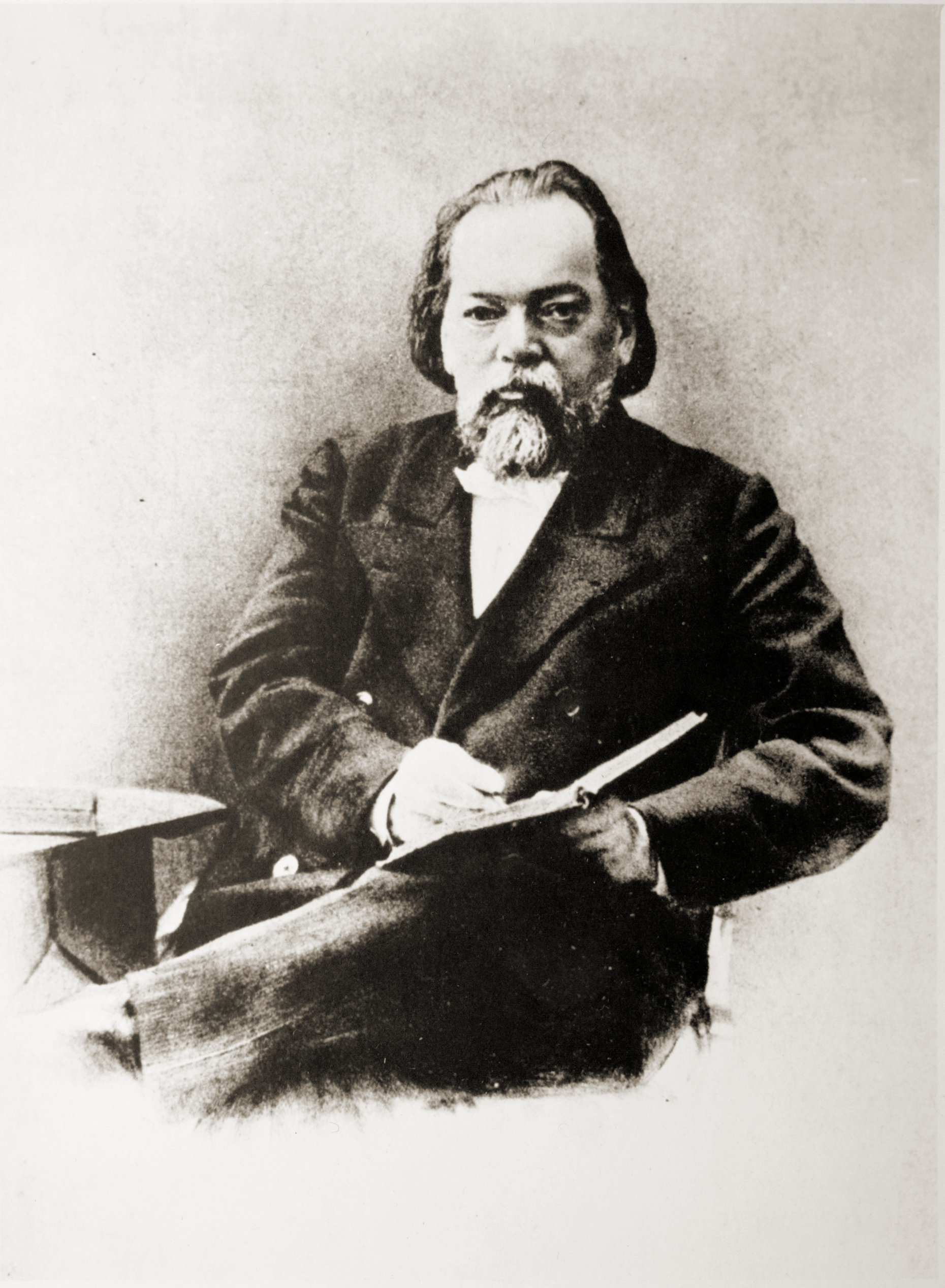
Fyodor Plevako

In 1896, he entered the bar and became a member of the Moscow Law Society. It seems that he became the assistant of the Polish lawyer Alexander Robertovich Lednicki and collaborated with Fedor Nikiforovich Plevako (1842–1909), a distinguished attorney at law and judicial speaker. Maklakov and his brother and sister Maria moved to Zubovsky Boulevard, not far from Leo Tolstoy in Khamovniki District. Together, they walked or went to the baths on which Maklakov had an interesting account. At Yasnaya Polyana, outside Moscow, they discussed the fate of the Doukhobors. At the novelist's urging, he defended a "Bespopovtsy" in the Kaluga Governorate accused of blasphemy; later he defended a "Tolstoyan", who was accused of storing prohibited works of Tolstoy; that case ended with an extremely lenient sentence. Plevako, a real state adviser, owned a Jugendstil apartment building at Novinskiy Boulevard. Maklakov, divorced, lived there too; they both were friendly with Anton Chekhov visiting Moscow in May 1903. Chekhov's intention to spend the summer at the Maklakov estate at Voskresensk did not materialise, but Maklakov signed Chekhov's will. Maklakov owned several hunting dogs and a dacha in Zvenigorod according to Chekhov.

Between 1901 and 1905, Maklakov defended several political demonstrations but also profitable commercial cases involving major Russian enterprises. He was deeply interested in the rule of law. In 1904, he was the secretary and archivist of the opposition circle Beseda. Then, he participated in the Union of Liberation, a moderate reform group of around 23 men. It saw as its task to fight the autocracy and to introduce a constitutional system in Russia. It imagined the future of Russia only in the development of the existing system, an organic evolution, not in coups. The members had a zemstvo background, representing the landowning class and intelligentsia.

=== The October Manifesto ===
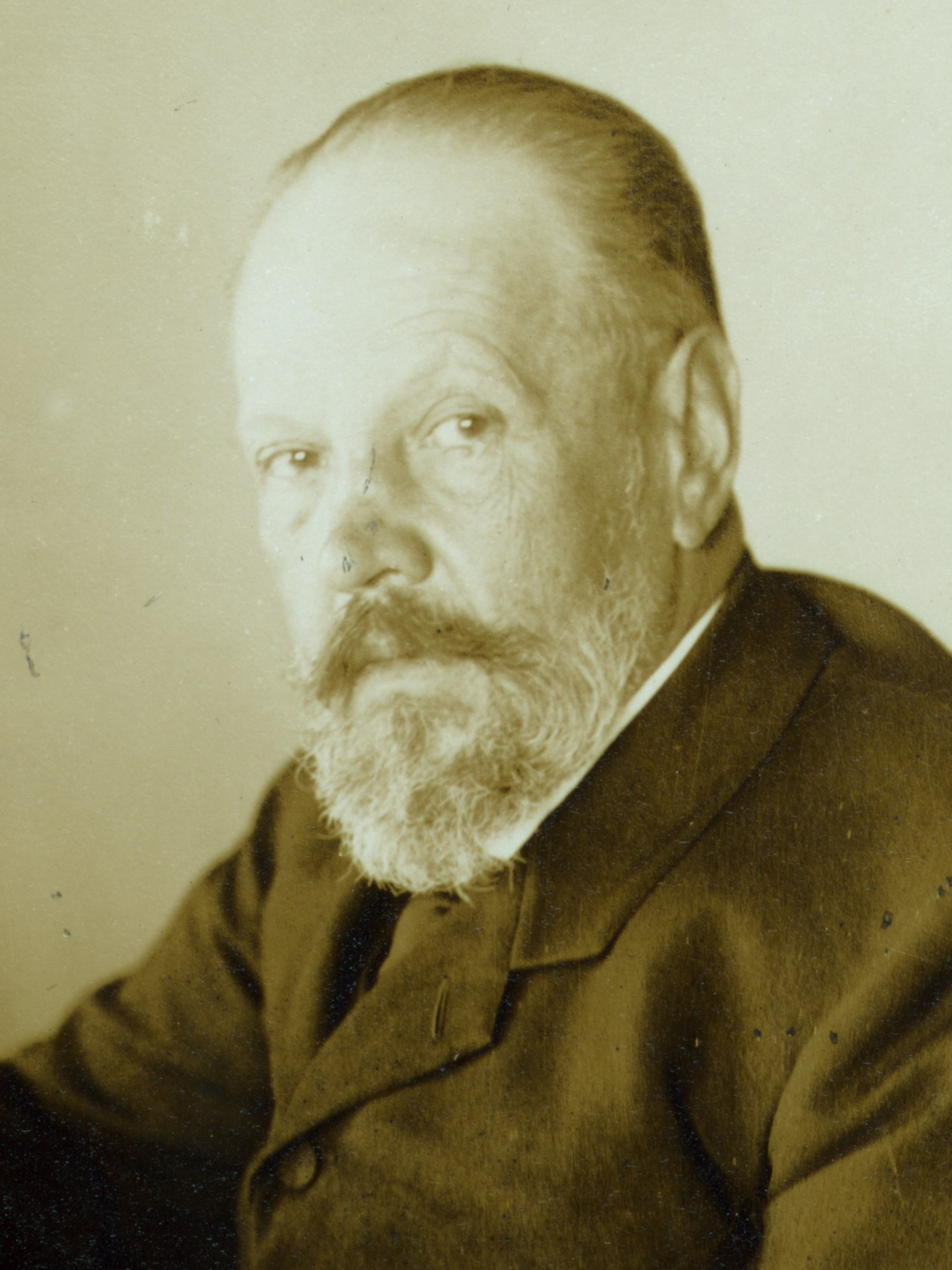
Sergei Witte in 1905

During the First Russian Revolution, the Tsar asked his cousin Grand Duke Nicholas to assume the role of dictator, but the Grand Duke threatened to shoot himself if the Tsar refused to endorse Sergei Witte's memorandum. After a ten-day general strike in October, Nicholas II had no choice but to take a number of steps in the constitutional liberal direction. In the October Manifesto, Witte advocated the creation of an elected parliament, which took the form of establishing the State Duma and the multi-party system. On 20 October 1905, Witte was appointed as the first Chairman of the Russian Council of Ministers (effectively Prime Minister), but the Kadets refused to join his cabinet. The Kadets doubted that Witte could deliver on the promises made by the Tsar in the October Manifesto since they knew the Tsar's staunch opposition to reform. On 9 November 1906, the cabinet issued a decree enabling Russia's 90 million peasants to start a complex process of transforming their property rights. On 24 November, by Imperial decree, provisional regulations on the censorship of magazines and newspaper was released. After an armed uprising in December 1905, the reactionary Pyotr Durnovo was appointed as Minister of Interior on 1 January 1906, a decision that was heavily criticized. The real ruler of the country was Dmitri Trepov. In the Russian Constitution of 1906, the Tsar gave up autocracy. In July, regretting his "moment of weakness", he dissolved the First Duma. The ministers remained responsible solely to Nicholas II, not to the Duma.

=== As deputy in the State Duma ===
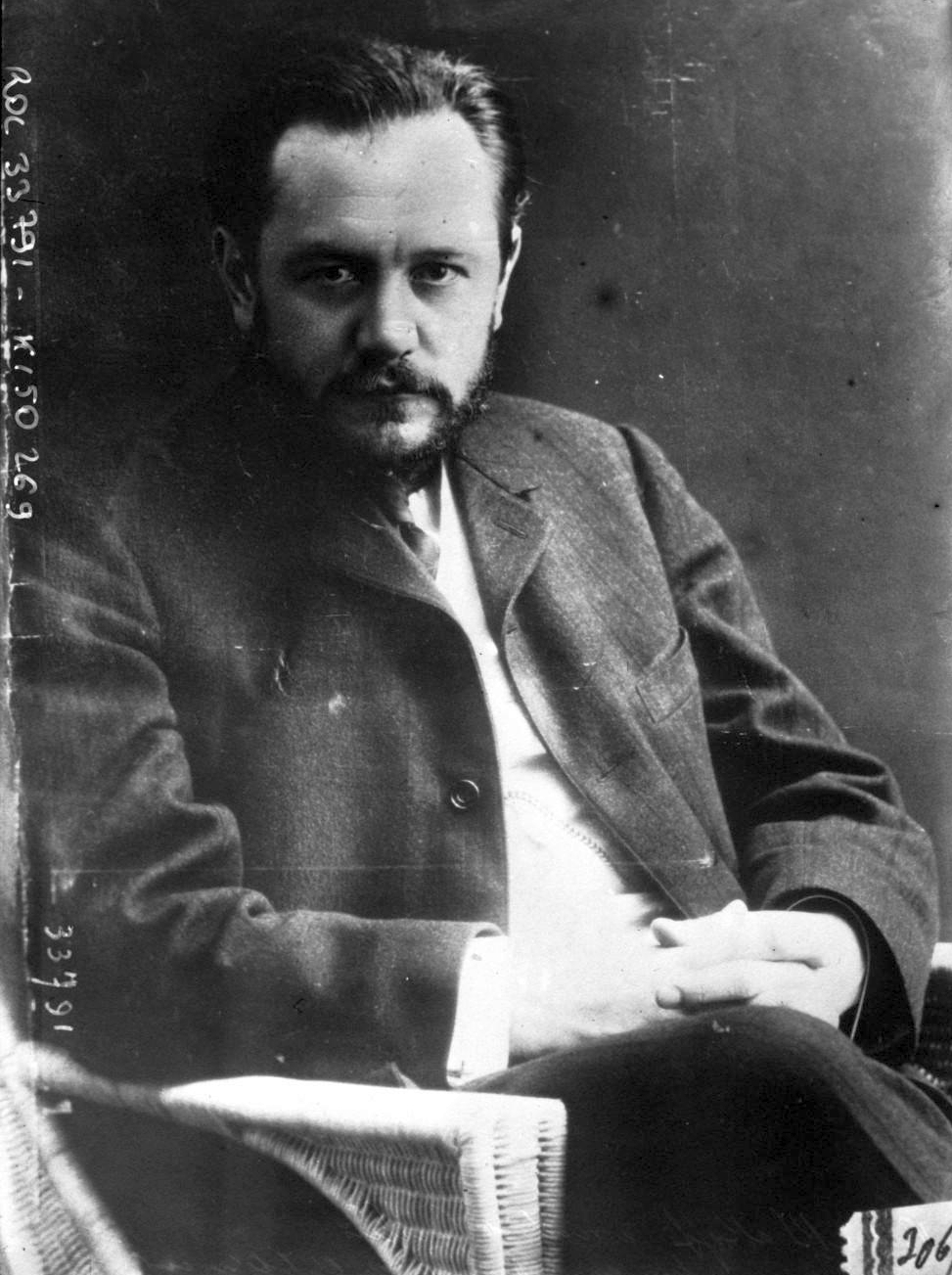
Maklakov in 1910

At the end of 1905, Maklakov joined the Freemasons when the right to form unions and private meetings was established under Nicholas II of Russia and thus the limitations on Freemasonry were lifted. Maklakov played an active part in the organization of the Constitutional Democratic Party (KD or Kadets), the first open political party serving on its central committee in October 1905. He promoted a coalition cabinet unlike Stolypin, Milyukov and Dmitri Trepov. Maklakov was elected by the Muscovites in the Arbat District to the Second Duma in February 1907, but he was more a lawyer than a deputy. He attracted attention with a brilliant speech about military field courts, dealt with Sergei Konstantinovich Gershelman, advocated the abolition of the death penalty and insisted on the inviolability of the individual. He was strongly opposed the signing of the Vyborg Manifesto, written by Pavel Milyukov. He tended toward conservatism, regretted the dissolution of the Union of Liberation, argued for a shift to the right and opposed alliances with revolutionaries. He hated long political meetings and did not like party discipline. He argued that as a political party the KD must prepare itself for government participation and so must be prepared to defend the rights of whatever sort of government if it wanted to be regarded as a serious political force and to concentrate on defending not only the rights of the people but also those of the state.

After the Coup of June 1907, which was considered by Maklakov as a day that would go down in infamy, Stolypin and the Tsar changed the electoral law and gave greater electoral value to the votes of landowners and owners of city properties and less value to the votes of the peasantry. In summer 1908, Maklakov travelled to Siberia because of the construction of the Amur Railway. In early 1909, he inherited Plevako's law practice. In May 1909, he delivered a lecture about the legal history of Russia in the 19th century. In 1912, the influence of the Kadets in the Duma had shrunk.

A high point of his legal career was the defence of Menahem Mendel Beilis, a Russian Jew wrongly accused of ritual murder of a 13-year-old Ukrainian child. Beilis was tried twice; the evidence against him was very weak. Alexander Tager wrote that "the whole country was against the process, except for the extreme right and that the ritual murder of which he was accused was a fiction of the Black Hundreds". Maklakov "hit the nail on the head," and in October 1913, Beilis was acquitted and immediately released. His acquittal was "a clear defeat for the authorities and a victory for liberal and radical public opinion" and greatly calmed public opinion, for no innocent man was convicted. The actual killers of the child were professional criminals. Maklakov had published articles claiming that the jury's verdict had saved the court's good name. Later it turned out that five of the jurors, including the foreman, had been members of the Union of the Russian People.

=== First World War ===
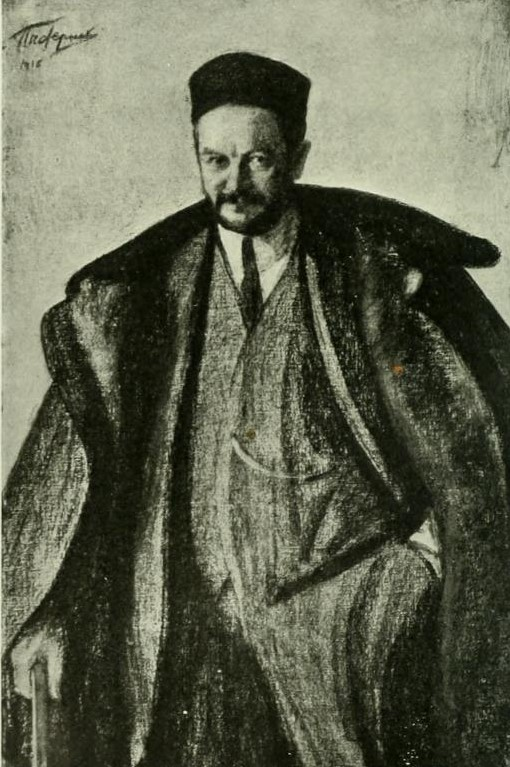
Portrait of Vasily Maklakov, by Leonid Pasternak (1916)

In 1914, Maklakov joined the All-Russian Zemstvo Union, which supported sick and wounded soldiers. Maklakov grew hostile to the government under Ivan Goremykin as the Eastern Front (World War I) went on. Russia hoped that the war would last until Christmas, but after a year, the situation had become disastrous. In the large cities, there were a shortage of food and high prices, and the Russian people blamed all on "dark forces" or spies for and collaborators with Germany. His younger brother, Nikolay Maklakov, a staunch monarchist who served as Russia's Interior Minister, was forced to resign. In September Maklakov published a sensational article, "A Tragic Situation," describing Russia as a vehicle with no brakes, driven along a narrow mountain path by a "mad chauffeur, who can't drive," an allegory with a reference to the Tsar. At the end of 1915, he actively supported the Progressive Bloc, a coalition of liberal parties that called for sweeping reforms, with the aim of inducing the Tsar to co-operate with the Fourth Duma. The most conservative of its leaders, Maklakov was anxious to preserve the party's unity, which appeared fragile in the face of his many ideological clashes with Milyukov, who was reputed for his intransigent liberal individualism. Milyukov suggested for Maklakov to join the Octobrists.

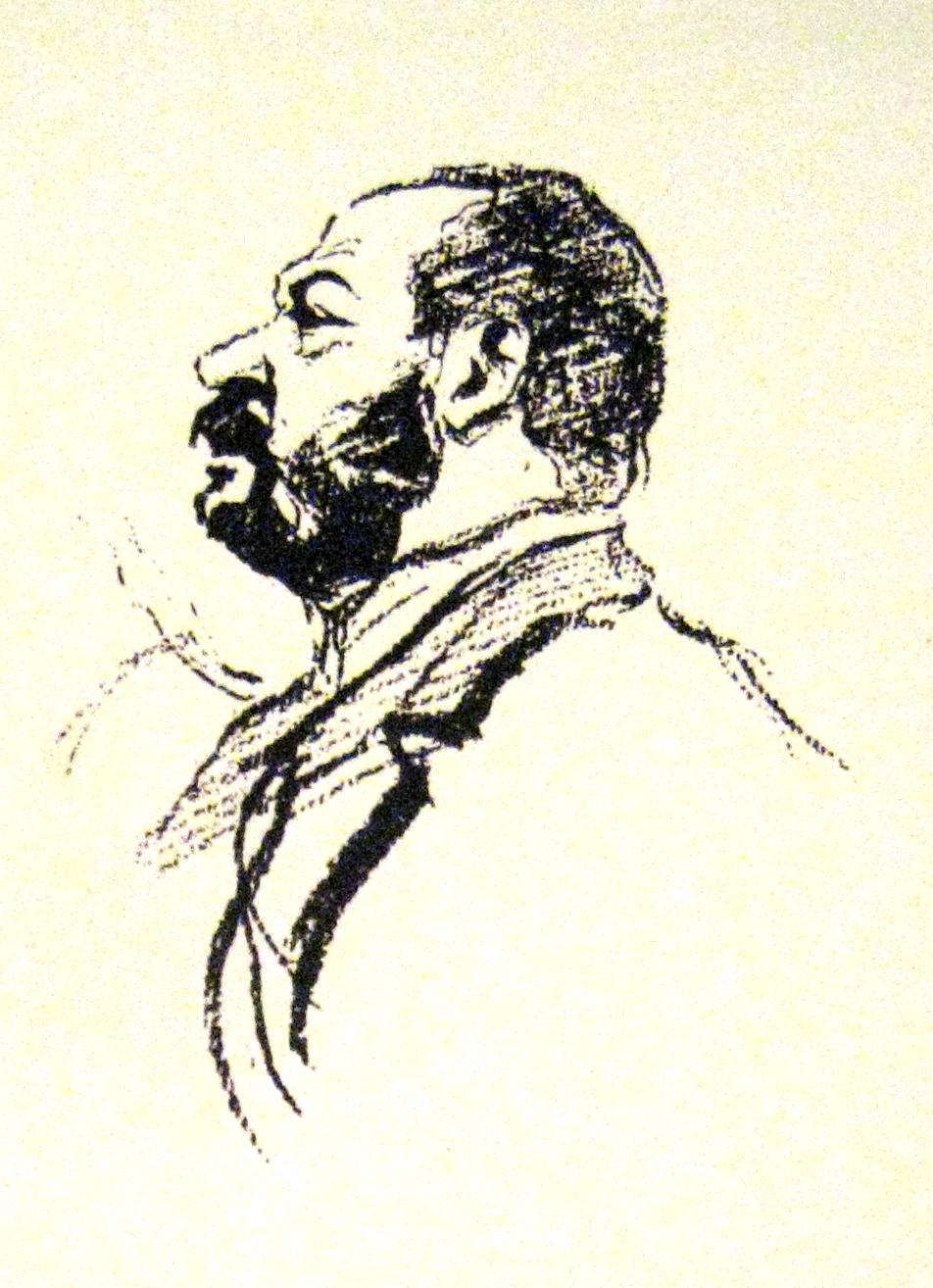
Vasily Maklakov by Yury Artsybushev

In early November 1916, Grand Duke Nicholas Mikhailovich of Russia, Prince Lvov and general Mikhail Alekseyev attempted to persuade the Tsar to send away Empress Alexandra Feodorovna, Rasputin's steadfast patron, to the Livadia Palace, in Yalta, or to Britain. On 3 November, Maklakov held a powerful speech the government of Boris Shturmer. He was visited soon by Yusupov but refused to get involved in a conspiracy although later that month, he decided to give him legal advice. Maklakov approved the murder of Grigory Rasputin and even served as a sort of "legal adviser" to one of its perpetrators, Felix Yusupov, but he categorically refused to participate in the plot. One of the five participants in the assassination, Vladimir Purishkevich, claimed that it was Maklakov who had supplied Prince Felix Yusupov with a dumbbell or truncheon and poison to murder Grigori Rasputin. On the day of the murder (30 December 1916), Maklakov left for Moscow, but went back the next day. In 1923, Maklakov wrote that he had supplied Yusupov with harmless aspirin. Also, Lazovert stated later he had used not poison but a harmless powder. The extent of his involvement in the murder of the "mad monk" is a matter of keen debate.

On 26 February 1917, Nikolai Pokrovsky reported on his negotiations with the Bloc, led by Maklakov, at the session of the Council of Ministers in the Mariinsky Palace. The Bloc spoke for the resignation of the government by Nikolai Golitsyn. On 27 February, Vasily was appointed as one of the 24 commissars the Provisional Committee of the State Duma. On 28 February, his brother Nikolay was arrested having tried to prevent a revolution" together with Alexander Protopopov (on 8 February). After the February Revolution, Vasily Maklakov supported Lavr Kornilov against Kerensky and aspired to take the office of Minister of Justice in the Provisional Government. After the post went to Alexander Kerensky, Maklakov was put in charge of the government's "legal commission". When he was elected in the Moscow City Duma on 8 July, he lived on 32 Novinsky Boulevard. He was friendly with countess Sofia Panina, the first woman in world history to hold a cabinet position. Maklakov was elected in the Constituent Assembly but in October was sent to Paris. Panina was arrested when she refused to transfer the funds of the Ministry of Education to the Bolsheviks. In the first political trial she was accused of embezzling 93,000 rubles from the Ministry, which she denied.

== France ==
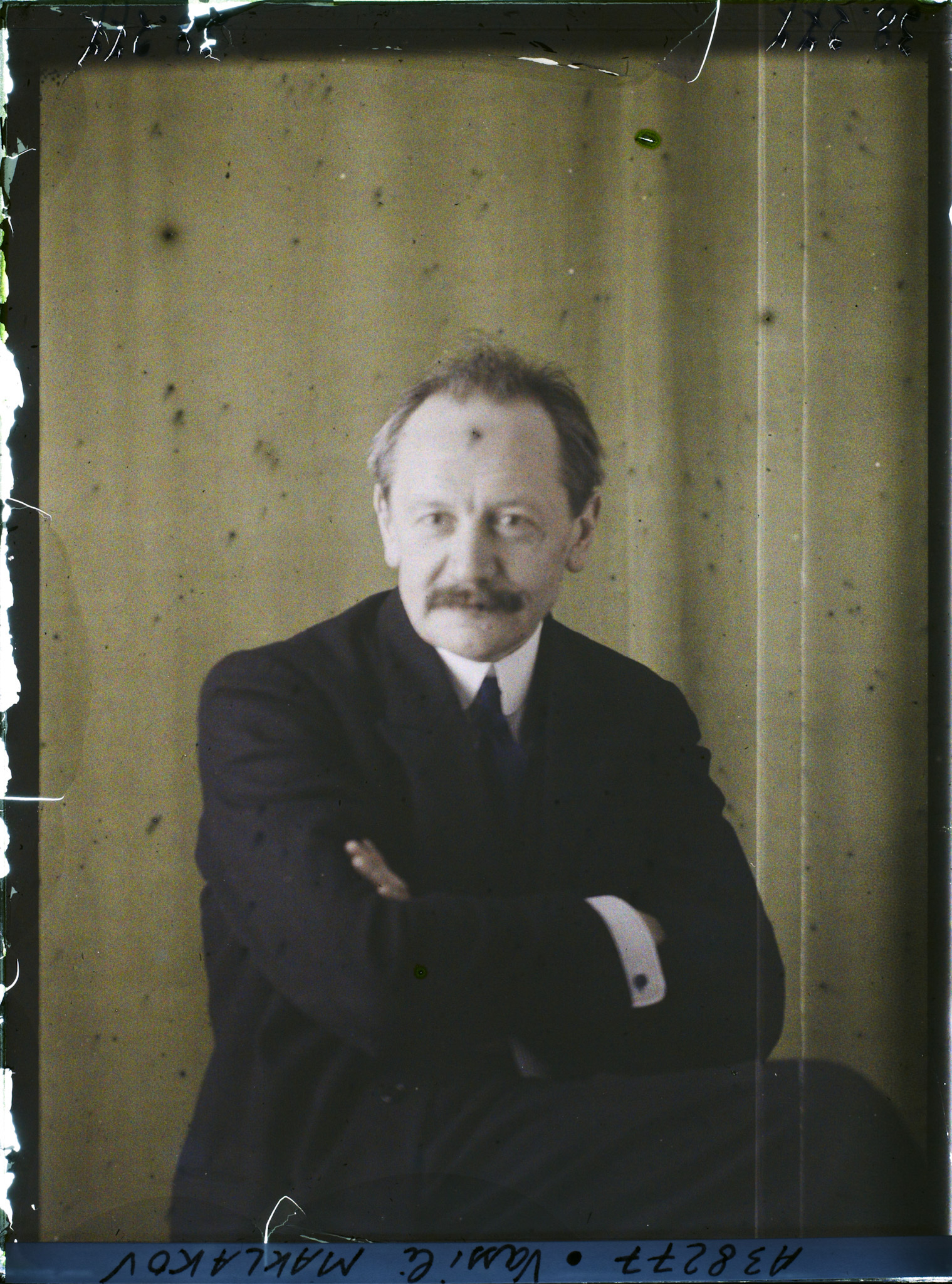
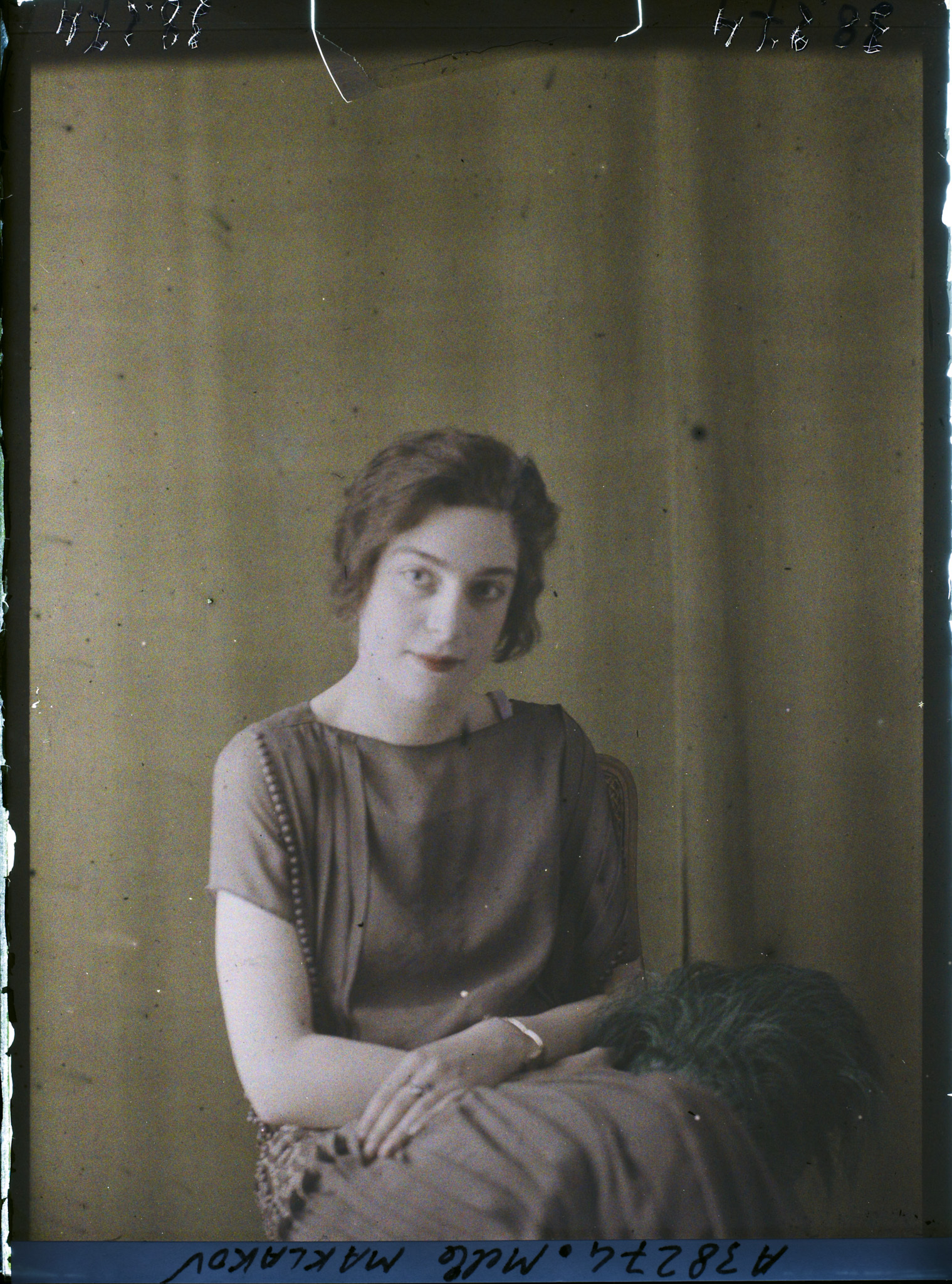
Autochrome portraits of Maklakov and his sister Olga by Georges Chevalier, 1923

In October 1917, Maklakov was appointed to replace Alexander Izvolsky as Ambassador to France. When he arrived in Paris, Maklakov learned of the Bolshevik takeover (October Revolution) and he represented a no longer existent government. In December he was put out of charge by Trotsky but nevertheless continued to occupy the splendid mansion of the Russian embassy for seven years. Hôtel d'Estrées served as the informal headquarters of the White émigré, the anti-Bolsheviks.

Throughout that period, French authorities considered Maklakov "an ambassador who had not yet been accredited". There was considerable ambiguity in this position. For example, he once received a letter from Premier Clemenceau addressed to "Son Excellence Monsieur Maklakoff, Ambassade de Russie", with the lightly erased letters "ur" at the end of "Ambassade". Maklakov lightly compared himself to "a magazine that one puts on a seat to show that it is occupied".

In Paris, he met with Nikolay Sokolov, who had investigated the cases of the execution of the Romanov family but held no longer legal authority. The Sokolov dossier was marked "secret" and secured inside the military procurator's archive until 1991. His sister Maria organized a gymnasium, funded by Henri Deterding. In 1920 Maklakov and Peter Struve managed to get Wrangel's regime officially recognized by France. Wrangel was extremely friendly, but not everybody was charmed by his personality. He wired Pyotr Wrangel that the French considered to encourage the Polish army to attack. Early September, Maklakov visited the Crimea to meet the leaders of the White Army at Sebastopol. It was his last visit to Russia. Maklakov recognized the qualities of Wrangel, who wanted to implement an agrarian reform, but three months later Wrangel's army ceased to exist. There was an official delegation of Bolsheviks in Paris, diplomatic relations between the Soviets and the United Kingdom and France were established on 2 February and 28 October 1924. Wrangel was told to abandon his (military) adventures.

For ten years, Maklakov corresponded with Vasily Shulgin, a member of the White Movement who escaped to Serbia. He assumed control of a network of offices Russes that certified marriages and births of Russian émigrés throughout France and performed other work normally undertaken by Russian consulates.

It was through Maklakov that the widow of Count Sergei Witte was able to obtain the memoirs of her late husband, which were of a destructive nature, stored in the safe of a bank in Bayonne. His secret memoirs, completed in 1912, were published in translation in 1921. The debate between Milyukov and Maklakov began in 1912 on the question of absenteeism and with Maklakov's criticism of the Constitutional Democratic Party. Maklakov supported Stolypin who had tried to form a "coalition cabinet", but Milyukov did not trust the Tsar and his Manifesto and refused to co-operate. Could the revolutions of 1917 have been prevented if the Kadets had adopted a less radical stance, particularly in 1905-1906?

The German Gestapo arrested Maklakov in April 1942, as he had not registered; he then spent 2–3 months in jail without trial. He was forced to leave Paris and moved in at the historian Baron Boris Nolde. Throughout World War II, he kept in touch with the French Resistance. In February 1945, Maklakov and several surviving members of the Provisional Government visited the Soviet embassy to express their pride and gratitude for the war effort of the Russian people. The visit was controversial among the émigré community, particularly after émigrés learned that Maklakov and others had drunk a toast "to the motherland, to the Red Army, to Stalin". In 1929 and again in 1945, he corresponded with Mark Aldanov, the literary consultant of the Chekhov Publishing House, which published mainly works by émigré authors. Some had joined the Union of Russian Patriots.

Despite encroaching deafness, Maklakov remained at the helm of the Russian Emigration Office (eventually subsumed into the structure of Charles de Gaulle's government) until his death at the age of 88. His front-rank reputation and talent for mediation allowed Maklakov (rather than better-known but controversial men like Kerensky and Milyukov) to manoeuvre between the many warring factions that made up the Russian émigré community and to represent their interests in dealing with the French government. For years, Maklakov was assisted by his sister Maria who was able to decipher his handwriting and did the typing in Rue Peguy (5th arrondissement of Paris). He died in a Swiss spa.

== Legacy ==
In his memoirs, "From the Past", first published in 1954, Maklakov discusses the causes of events in Russia, which he witnessed and participated in, touches upon such issues that have not lost their relevance today such as the essence of democracy, the functions of a democratic state, the relationship between the state and the individual, the coordination of the interests of the majority in society and minorities. He expressed his hope for its further evolution", for "its synthesis with the rest of the world". He was not entirely satisfied with Western democracies: they could not prevent world wars, nor the emergence of totalitarian regimes, nor ensure equal rights for all.

"If our planet does not perish sooner from cosmic causes, then a peaceful community of people on it can only be built on the principles of equal for all, that is, fair rights. Not on the deceptive victory of the strongest, not on self-denial or self-sacrifice to others, but on justice. The future is hidden from us; no one can guarantee that justice will prevail in the world. But for human nature, peace is possible only on these principles.

Maklakov spent most of his career attempting to reform the (legal) system in Russia unsuccessfully. He wrote several books on the history of social thought and the Russian liberal movement. In Soviet times Maklakov (and the Kadets) were seen as "bourgeois" and "not studied".

In 1926 and with the help of Nikolai Golovin Maklakov took control of the Okhrana archives from 1883 to 1917 stored at the Paris embassy. His personal archive was transferred to Hoover Institution (Stanford University) after his death. In 1959 Georgy Adamovich published a biography on Maklakov.

== Works ==
- "Tolstoy as a public figure" (1912)
- Memories. Leader of the Moscow Cadets on Russian politics. 1880–1917
- "State Power and Public Life at the Decline of Old Russia," (1936)
- "The First State Duma. Memories of a Contemporary," completed in 1939 and even typed, but did not go on sale.
- The First State Duma: Contemporary Reminiscenses. Indiana University Press, Bloomington, 1964.
- "The Second State Duma" (1940) or (1944, 1946)?
- Court speeches, Duma speeches, and public lectures. 1904-1926 (with a foreword by M.A. Aldanov) - Paris. 1949
- "Soviet Power and Emigration"
- From the past. Contemporary notes. Chekhov Publishing House. New York 1954
- Politician, Lawyer, Man (1959).

== Sources ==
- Dedkov, N.I. (2005) The conservative liberalism of Vasilii Maklakov. ISBN 978-5-88735-134-6
- Hamza, Gabor, Some Remarks on the Educational Background and Political Career of Alexander Fjodorovits Kerensky in (Tzarist) Russia. Polgari Szemle 11 (2015) 394–397. pp.
- Hamza, Gabor, Survey on the oeuvre of Vasilij Aleksejevic Maklakov (1869–1957), the Statesman, Diplomat and Scholar of Classical Antiquity. Jogelmeleti Szemle 2016/4. http://jesz.ajk.elte.hu/2016_4.pdf
- Kröner, A.W.(1998) "The Debate Between Miliukov and Maklakov on the Chances for Russian Liberalism." [s.n.].
- Kröner, Anthony (2021) Vasilii Maklakov: A Russian liberal between autocracy and revolution 1869–1957
- Smith, Douglas (2016). Rasputin: Faith, Power, and the Twilight of the Romanovs. Farrar, Straus and Giroux. ISBN 978-0-374-71123-8.
- Williams, Stephen F. (2017) The Reformer: How One Liberal Fought to Preempt the Russian Revolution

== See also ==
- On YouTube: Stephen F. Williams "The Reformer"
- A letter from Maklakov to Alexinsky on the blank of the Residence of the Ambassador of Russia in France (Backup)
- List of Russian legal historians
- List of scholars in Russian law
