= Yakov Lobanov-Rostovsky =

Yakov Lobanov-Rostovsky may refer to:

- Yakov Lobanov-Rostovsky (1660–1732), Russian statesman and civil servant
- Yakov Lobanov-Rostovsky (1760–1831), Russian statesman
