= Rostock (disambiguation) =

Rostock, officially the University and Hanseatic City of Rostock is the largest city in the German federal state of Mecklenburg-Western Pomerania.

Rostock may also refer to:

== Places ==
- Rostock (district), a district in the north of Mecklenburg-Vorpommern, Germany
- Rostock-Lichtenhagen, a borough of Rostock in the federal state Mecklenburg-Vorpommern, Germany.
- Rostock Hauptbahnhof, also Rostock Central Station (from 1896 until the turn of the 20th century called Rostock Central-Bahnhof), the main railway station in the German city of Rostock.
- Rostock–Laage Airport
- Rostock Port
- University of Rostock
- Bezirk Rostock, a district (Bezirk) of East Germany
- Dals Rostock, a locality situated in Mellerud Municipality, Västra Götaland County, Sweden
- Rostock Switzerland, a terminal moraine landscape and part of the Kösterbeck Nature Reserve

== People ==
- Clemens Rostock (born 1984), German politician
- Marlies Rostock (born 1960), East German cross-country skier
- Paul Rostock (1892–1956), German official, surgeon, and university professor

== Music ==
- Jennifer Rostock, German rock band

== Others ==
- Lordship of Rostock or Principality of Rostock, was a state of the Holy Roman Empire in the 13th and early 14th centuries
- Rostock Peace Treaty, a treaty, or Landfriede, agreed on 13 June 1283 in Rostock to secure the peace on land and at sea, as well as the protection of taxes and other freedoms
- SMS Rostock, a light cruiser of the Karlsruhe class built by the German Kaiserliche Marine (Imperial Navy)
- Rostock, a faction in the Sky Crawlers book series

== See also ==
- Rostov (disambiguation)
- Rossstock, a mountain in Switzerland
