= Nicholas Golovin =

Nicholas Golovin may refer to:

- Nicholas E. Golovin, American physicist who worked briefly for NASA, and for President John F. Kennedy's and Lyndon B. Johnson's Science Advisory Committee, notable for helping Jerome Wiesner challenge NASA's decision to use lunar orbit rendezvous in the Apollo program
- Nikolai Golovin (1875-1944), Russian general and military historian
