= Lyubimov =

Lyubimov or Lubimov (Russian: Любимов) is a Russian masculine surname, its feminine counterpart is Lyubimova or Lubimova. It may refer to:

- Alexander Lubimov (1879–1955), Russian realist painter and illustrator
- Alexei Lubimov (born 1944), Russian pianist, fortepianist and harpsichordist
- Lev Lyubimov (1902–1976), Russian journalist, writer and art historian
- Mikhail Lyubimov (born 1934), Russian novelist and retired KGB colonel
- Nadezhda Lyubimova (born 1959), Russian rower
- Olga Lyubimova (born 1980), Russian politician
- Pavel Lyubimov (1938–2010), Russian film director and screenwriter
- Yuri Lyubimov (1917–2014), Russian stage actor and director
