= Rostov (surname) =

Rostov, feminine: Rostova is a Russian surname. Notable people with the surname include:

- Anna Rostova, Ukrainian former volleyball player
- Mira Rostova, Russian American actress turned acting teacher
- Polina Rostova, Russian singer

Characters in Leo Tolstoy's novel War and Peace

- Natasha Rostova
- Nikolai Rostov
- Petya Rostov
- Sonya Rostova

== See also ==
- Rostow
- Rostowa
