= Dmitry Odinets =

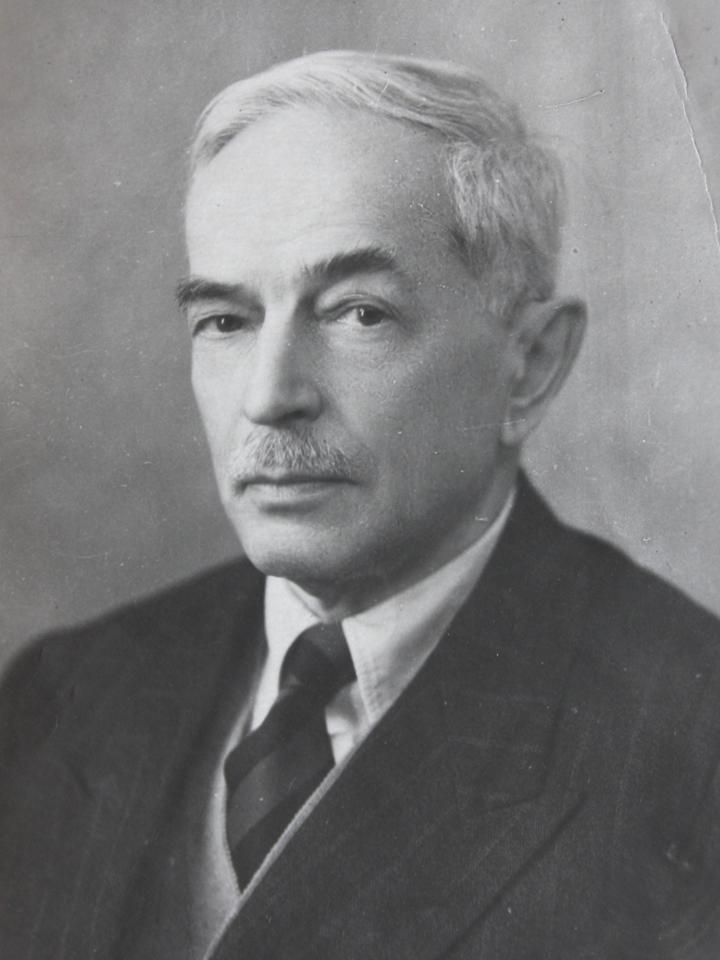
Dimitriy Odinets

Dmitry Mikhaylovich Odinets (Russian: Дмитрий Михайлович Одинец; 7 January 1883 [O.S. 26 December 1882] – 10 May 1950) was a Russian Empire politician and Ukrainian statesman.

In 1917-18 he was a minister of Great Russian Affairs in the Council of People's Ministers in Ukraine. In 1940s Odinets chaired the Union of Russian Patriots, a pro-Soviet organization of Russian émigrés in France. After Odinets was exiled to USSR along with other members of the Union, he settled in Kazan and taught Latin at the Kazan State University.

== Bibliography ==
- Odinets, D. Out of the history of Ukrainian separatism
