= Rostovsky =

Rostovsky (masculine), Rostovskaya (feminine), or Rostovskoye (neuter) may refer to:

- Rostovsky District, a district of Yaroslavl Oblast, Russia
- Rostovsky (inhabited locality) (Rostovskaya, Rostovskoye), several rural localities in Russia
- Olesya Rostovskaya (b.1975), Russian composer, theremin player, carillonneur, organist, and Russian bell-ringer

== See also ==
- Rostov (disambiguation)
- Lobanov-Rostovsky
- Maria Buynosova-Rostovskaya
