= Moscow Metropolis electoral district =

Legislative constituency of the Russian Republic

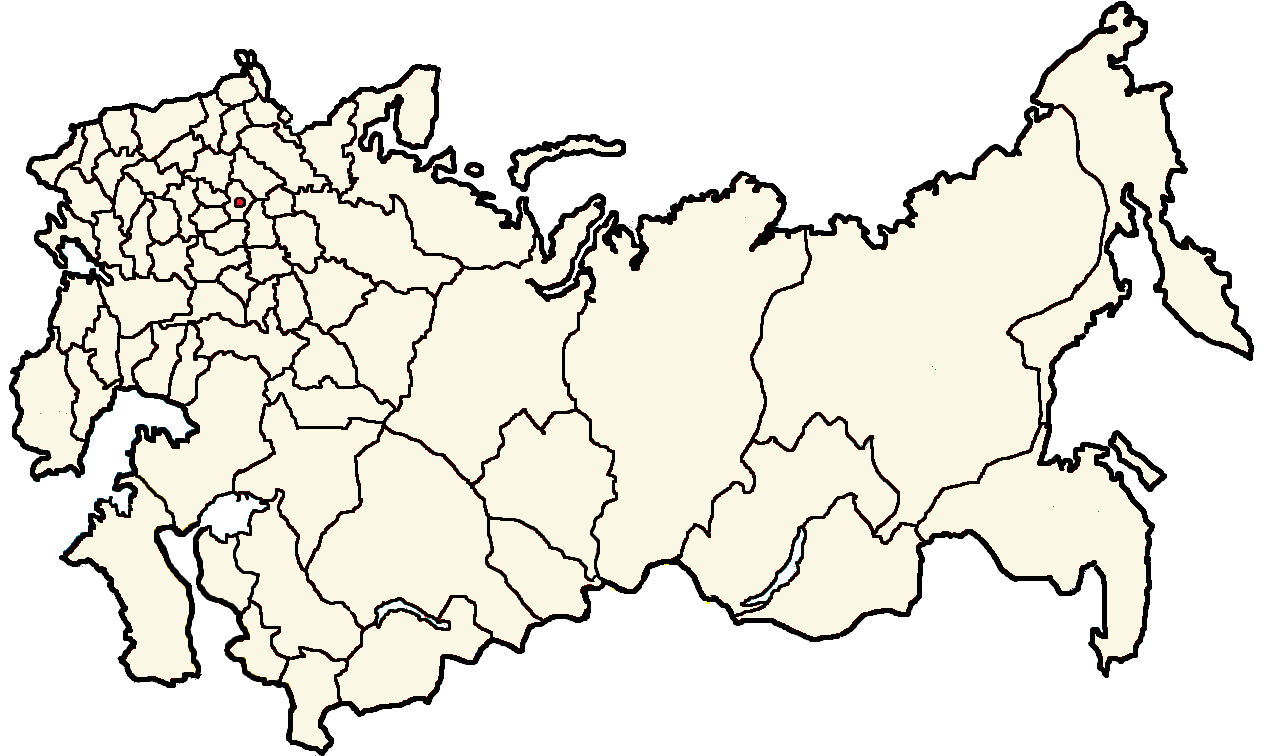
Moscow Metropolis electoral district

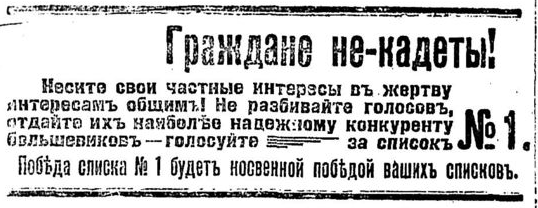
Advert for List 1

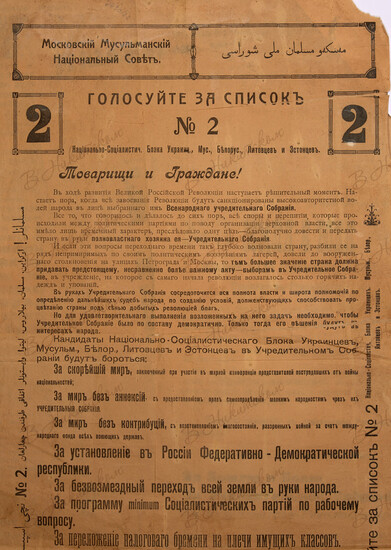
Leaflet of the Moscow Muslim National Council, calling for a vote for List 2

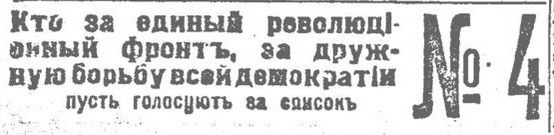
Advert for List 4

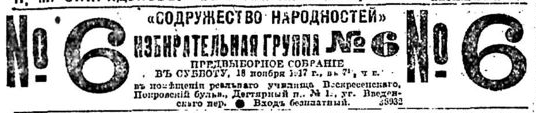
Advert for List 6

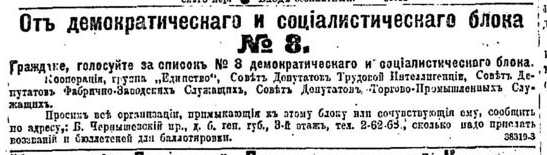
Advert for List 8

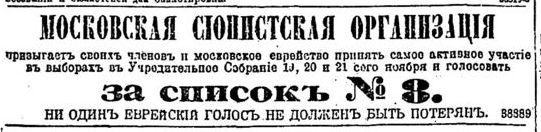
Advert of the Moscow Zionist Organization, calling for a vote for List 8

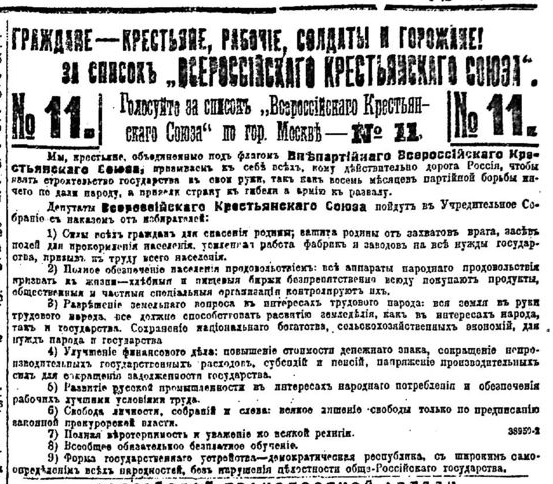
Advert for List 11

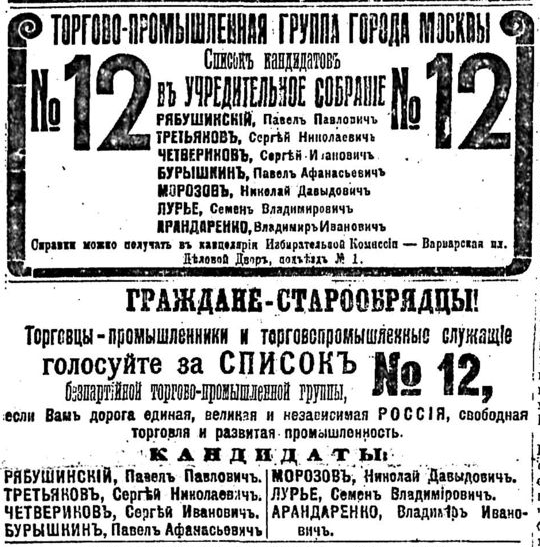
Adverts for List 12

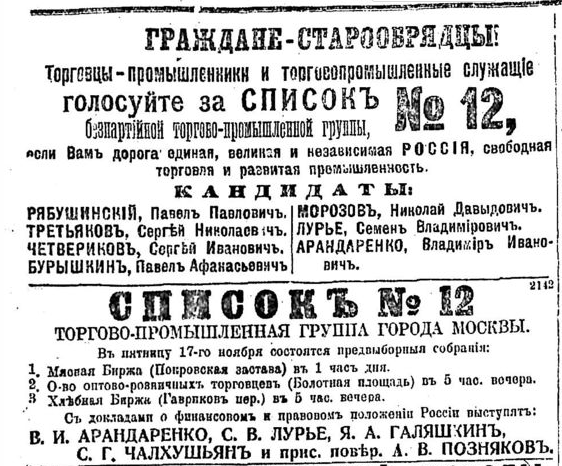
Advert for List 12

The Moscow Metropolis electoral district (Russian: Московский столичный избирательный округ) was a constituency created for the 1917 Russian Constituent Assembly election. The electoral district covered the city of Moscow. Voter turnout in the city was estimated at between 65.4% and 69.7%.

The Menshevik list was headed by Pavel Axelrod. The Democratic Socialist Bloc list was headed by Georgi Plekhanov.

== Results ==
Moscow City
Party	Vote	%	Seats	%
List 5 - Bolsheviks	366,148	47.88	6	54.55
List 1 - Kadets	263,859	34.50	4	36.36
List 3 - Socialist-Revolutionaries	62,260	8.14	1	9.09
List 8 - Democratic Socialist Bloc (incl. Cooperative, Unity)	35,305	4.62	0	0.00
List 4 - Mensheviks	19,690	2.57	0	0.00
List 9 - Labour Non-Party Group (Rightists, ex-Octobrists)	4,085	0.53	0	0.00
List 7 - Popular Socialists	2,508	0.33	0	0.00
List 2 - National-Socialist Bloc (Ukrainian Socialist Bloc and Nationalist Bloc)	2,346	0.31	0	0.00
List 12 - Commercial-Industrial Group	2,300	0.30	0	0.00
List 11 - All-Russian Peasants Union	2,279	0.30	0	0.00
List 6 - Commonwealth of Nations (mainly Germans)	2,076	0.27	0	0.00
List 10 - United Internationalists	1,907	0.25	0	0.00
Total:	764,763		11	

Deputies Elected
Astrov	Kadet
Kokoshkin	Kadet
Maklakov	Kadet
Novgorodtsev	Kadet
Minor	SR
Bukharin	Bolshevik
Ignatov	Bolshevik
Meshcheryakov	Bolshevik
Skvortsov-Stepanov	Bolshevik
Smidovich	Bolshevik
Yaroslavsky	Bolshevik
