= Yakov Lobanov-Rostovsky (1660–1732) =

Russian statesman and civil servant

Prince Yakov Lobanov-Rostovsky (1660 – 23 May 1732) was a Rurikid prince of the Lobanov-Rostovsky family and Russian statesman and civil servant. In 1685 he was accused of robbing the royal treasury and killing the two people who carried it on the Trinity Road, for which he was severely beaten.
