= Rostov (disambiguation) =

Rostov, or Rostov-on-Don, is a city in Rostov Oblast, Russia.

Rostov may also refer to:

- Rostov Veliky, a town in Yaroslavl Oblast, Russia

== Other places ==
- Rostov Oblast federal subject of Russia
- Rostov constituency (Rostov Oblast)
- Rostov-Yaroslavski - a railway station in Rostov (Yaroslavl Oblast, Russia)
- Rostov constituency (Yaroslavl Oblast)
- Rostov, Shostka Raion, village in Ukraine

== Other ==
- Rostov (surname)
- FC Rostov - a Russian association football club from Rostov-on-Don, Russia
- HC Rostov
- Rostov Arena - an association football stadium in Rostov-on-Don, Russia
- Russian submarine B-237 "Rostov-na-Donu", Russian submarine

== See also ==
- Rostovsky (disambiguation)
- Rostow
