= Rostovsky (inhabited locality) =

Rostovsky (Russian: Ростовский; masculine), Rostovskaya (Ростовская; feminine), or Rostovskoye (Ростовское; neuter) is the name of several rural localities in Russia:

- Rostovsky (rural locality), a settlement in Khvastovichsky District of Kaluga Oblast
- Rostovskoye, Arkhangelsk Oblast, a village in Konetsgorsky Selsoviet of Vinogradovsky District of Arkhangelsk Oblast
- Rostovskoye, Kaliningrad Oblast, a settlement in Kamensky Rural Okrug of Chernyakhovsky District of Kaliningrad Oblast
