= Rostovskoye, Arkhangelsk Oblast =

Rostovskoye Ростовское
- Village
- Location within Arkhangelsk Oblast Location within Russia
- Coordinates: 62°46′N 43°10′E
- Country: Russia
- Region: Arkhangelsk Oblast
- District: Vinogradovsky District
- Time zone: UTC+3:00

Rostovskoye (Russian: Ростовское) is a rural locality (a village) in Osinovskoye Rural Settlement of Vinogradovsky District, Arkhangelsk Oblast, Russia. The population was 56 as of 2010. There is 1 street.

== Geography ==
Rostovskoye is located on the Severnaya Dvina River, 26 km southeast of Bereznik (the district's administrative centre) by road. Rostovskoye is the nearest rural locality.
