= Lobanove =

Village in Crimea

- Village
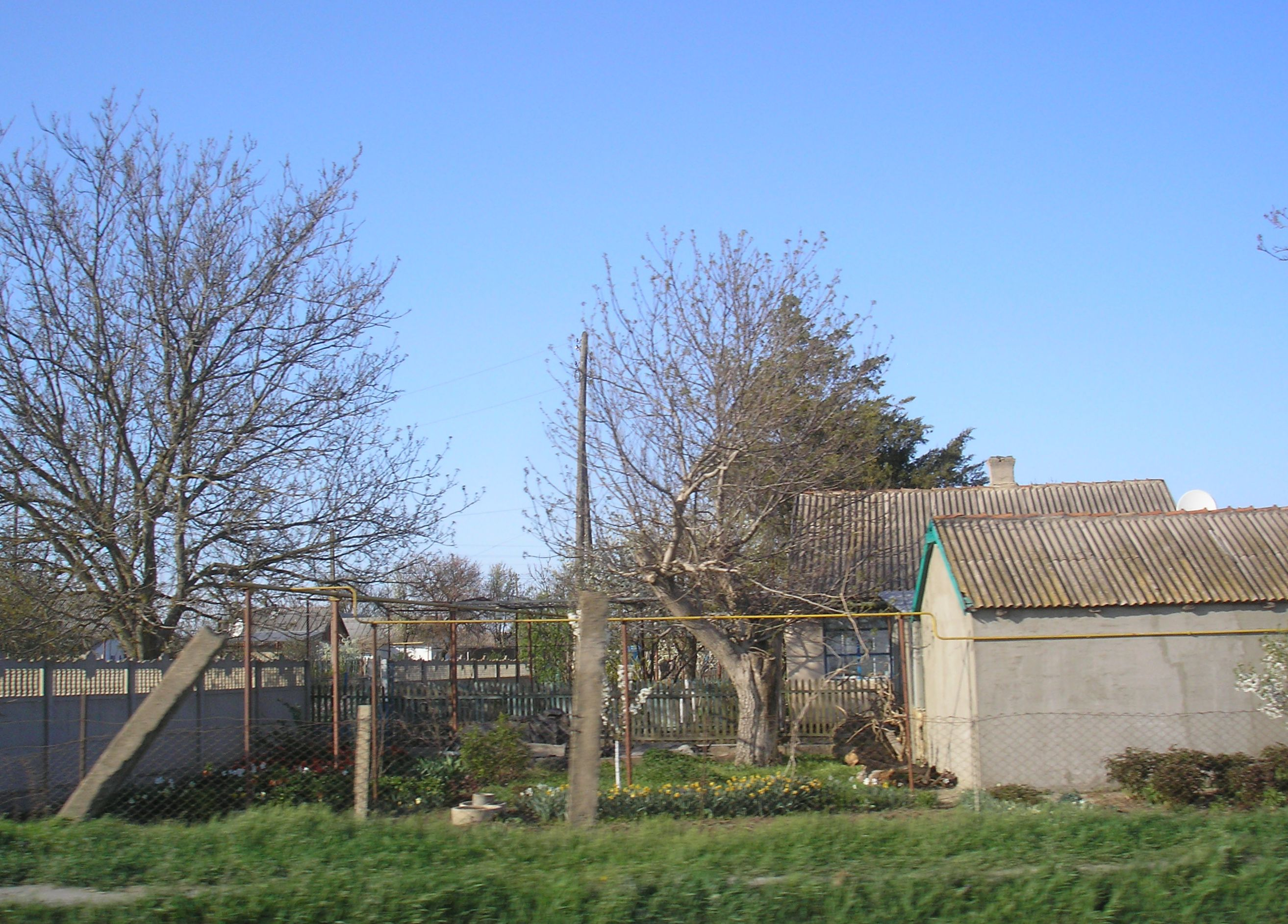

- Location within Crimea
- Coordinates: 45°46′35″N 34°14′40″E
- Country: Disputed: Ukraine (de jure); Russia (de facto)
- Region: (Autonomous Republic of Crimea) Crimea^{1}
- Municipality: Dzhankoi

Population
  - Total: 1,402
- Time zone: UTC+4 (MSK)
- ^{1} Autonomous Republic of Crimea (de jure) or Republic of Crimea (de facto), depending on jurisdiction.

Lobanove (Russian: Лобаново; Ukrainian: Лобанове; Crimean Tatar: Cadra) is a village located in Dzhankoi Raion, Crimea. Population: 1,402 (2014 Census).

== See also ==
- Dzhankoi Raion
