= Rostow =

Rostow is an Americanized form of the Russian and Ashkenazi Jewish toponymic surname Rostov (Russian: Ростов; masculine) or Rostova (Ростова; feminine). It indicates someone from Rostov in Russia. Notable people with the surname include:

- Elspeth Rostow (1917–2007), American educator and policy advisor
- Eugene V. Rostow (1913–2002), American jurist
- Lois Rostow Kuznets, American professor emeritus specializing in children's literature
- Walt Rostow (1916–2003), American economist and political theorist

== See also ==
- Rostov (disambiguation)
- Rostovsky (disambiguation)
