= Lobanovo, Gus-Khrustalny District, Vladimir Oblast =

Lobanovo Лобаново
- Village
- Location within Vladimir Oblast Location within Russia
- Coordinates: 55°51′N 40°38′E
- Country: Russia
- Region: Vladimir Oblast
- District: Gus-Khrustalny District
- Time zone: UTC+3:00

Lobanovo (Russian: Лобаново) is a rural locality (a village) in Posyolok Krasnoye Ekho, Gus-Khrustalny District, Vladimir Oblast, Russia. The population was 7 as of 2010.

== Geography ==
Lobanovo is located 33 km north of Gus-Khrustalny (the district's administrative centre) by road. Potapovskaya is the nearest rural locality.
