= Semyon Lobanov-Rostovsky =

Semyon Mikhailovich Lobanov-Rostovsky (Russian: Семён Михайлович Лобанов-Ростовский) was a Russian statesman and military leader during the reigns of Ivan the Terrible and Feodor I of Russia.

He served regiment voivode in Novgorod, Pskov, Porkhov, Ladoga, Bryansk, Dedilov, Novgorod oblast.
