= Union of Russian Patriots =

Political organization

The Union of Russian Patriots (Russian: Союз русских патриотов) was an organization of Russian (White) emigres living in France. The organization was pro-Soviet and was active from 1943 to 1948.

When Germany invaded the USSR, the occupation authorities started with massive arrests of Russian emigres residing in France, e.g. Dmitry Odinets. Many Russians participated in the French resistance movement, and a number of those founded the Union of Russian Patriots on 3 October 1943 in collaboration with the French Communist Party. The union published the newspaper Russian Patriot. After the Liberation of France the organization was renamed the Union of Soviet Patriots («Союз советских патриотов») and the newspaper was consequently renamed Soviet Patriot. The activities of the Union proceeded with contacts with the Soviet consulate general in Paris. At that time, the membership of the Union was estimated to be 6,500.

After the Presidium of the Supreme Soviet of the USSR published the decree on reinstating Soviet citizenship for former subjects of the Russian Empire living in France, many White emigres (including the overwhelming majority of the members of the Union) decided to apply for Soviet passports.

Thereafter, the Union itself was again renamed, this time becoming the Union of Soviet Citizens in France (Союз советских граждан во Франции). Against the backdrop of the Cold War, in 1947 the French authorities arrested and expelled most of the Union's leaders from France (among them Lev Lyubimov). On 16 January 1948 the Union was closed on the order of the French internal minister. In March 1948, all participants of a gathering of the board of the Union were arrested and deported to the Soviet occupation zone in Germany.

== Bibliography ==
- Krivochéine, Igor (1972). Так нам велело сердце // Против общего врага: советские люди во французском движении Сопротивления (in Russian). Moscow.
- Pavel M. Polian, Christine Colpart Le rapatriement des citoyens soviétiques depuis la France et les zones françaises d’occupation en Allemagne et en Autriche — Cahiers du Monde russe, Vol. 41, No. 1 (January — March 2000), pp. 165–189
- http://www.ukrnationalism.org/articles/boregar.html
- "Младороссы и Александр Угримов". RFE/RL (in Russian). 8 August 2005.
- Petrov, Vladimir. "Кесарь и художник". stalinism.ru (in Russian). Archived from the original on 10 September 2010.
