= Nikolai Golovin =

Russian general (1875–1944)

Nikolai Nikolayevich Golovin
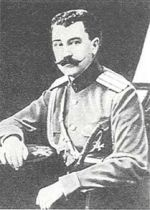
- Born: 4 December 1875; Moscow, Russian Empire
- Died: 10 January 1944 (aged 68); Paris, France
- Military career
- Allegiance: Russian Empire
- Branch: Imperial Russian Army; White Army
- Service years: 1885–1917
- Rank: Chief of Staff
- Commands: Grodno Hussar regiment Professor, General Staff Academy; Quartermaster General, 9th Army; Chief of Staff, 7th Army
- Conflicts: First World War; Russian Civil War
- Other work: The problem of the Pacific in the twentieth century. 1922. (co-authored with Andrei Bubnov); The Russian Campaign of 1914: The Beginnings of the War and Operations in East Prussia. Fort Leavenworth, KS, The Command and General Staff School Press, 1933.

Nikolai Nikolayevich Golovin (Russian: Никола́й Никола́евич Голови́н; 4 December 1875 – 10 January 1944) was an Imperial Russian Army general and military historian.

== Biography ==
Since 1908 Golovin was professor of tactics at the General Staff Academy.

At the beginning of World War I, Golovin commanded the Grodno Hussar regiment. Later he was transferred to staff of general Platon Lechitsky's 9th Army as Quartermaster-General (Director of operations), and in 1916 as Chief of Staff of 7th Army. In 1917 he was Chief of Staff of the Romanian Front.

After the Russian Revolution and break-up of the army he retired to Odessa where he lived in obscurity until the victory of the Allies and opening of the Black Sea allowed him to come to Western Europe.

In autumn 1919 he travelled from Paris through Vladivostok to Siberia to join Admiral Aleksandr Kolchak's White movement. It was assumed that Golovin would be the Chief of Staff of Kolchak's army. But when he arrived at Omsk, Kolchak's army was already retreating in disarray. Golovin decided that the situation was hopeless and did not take command, returning to Vladivostok and Europe.

While living as an emigre in Paris he authored numerous books and articles on military theory and military history. He collected documents on Russian history for the Hoover library. With the help of Vasily Maklakov the Okhrana-archive was transferred. Golovin's personal collection of documents was also deposited in the Hoover Institution's archive.

== Works ==
=== Books ===
- The problem of the Pacific in the twentieth century. 1922. (co-authored with Andrei Bubnov)
- The Russian Army in World War I. New Haven, Yale University Press, 1931.
- The Russian Campaign of 1914: The Beginnings of the War and Operations in East Prussia. Fort Leavenworth, KS, The Command and General Staff School Press, 1933.
- Air strategy. 1936.

=== Articles ===
- Great battle for Galicia: A Study in Strategy The Slavonic Review, Vol. 5, No. 13 (Jun., 1926), pp. 25–47
- Brusilov's Offensive: The Galician Battle of 1916. The Slavonic and East European Review, Vol. 13, No. 39 (Apr., 1935), pp. 571–596
- The Russian War Plan of 1914. The Slavonic and East European Review, Vol. 14, No. 42 (Apr., 1936), pp. 564–584.
- The Russian War Plan of 1914: II. The Execution of the Plan. The Slavonic and East European Review, Vol. 15, No. 43 (Jul., 1936), pp. 70–90

== Literature ==
- Timothy C. Dowling. Golovin, Nikolai (1875–1944) // Russia at War: From the Mongol Conquest to Afghanistan, Chechnya, and Beyond [2 volumes]. — ABC-CLIO, 2014. — P. 311. — 1166 p. — ISBN 9781598849486.
- Головин, Николай Николаевич // Военная энциклопедия : [в 18 т.] / под ред. В. Ф. Новицкого [и др.]. — СПб.; [М.] : Тип. т-ва И. Д. Сытина, 1911–1915. [in Russian]
- Залесский К. А. Головин Николай Николаевич // Кто был кто в первой мировой войне. Биографический энциклопедический словарь. М., 2003. [in Russian]
- Порохин С. Генерального штаба Генерал-лейтенант, профессор Головин Николай Николаевич // Посев. — 2011. — Вып. 10 (1609). — С. 41–44. — ISSN 0234-8284. [in Russian]
