= Evgeny Lobanov =

Russian ice hockey player

- Born: June 25, 1984 (age 42) Arkhangelsk, RUS
- Height: 5 ft 10 in (178 cm)
- Weight: 176 lb (80 kg; 12 st 8 lb)
- Position: Goalie
- Catches: Left
- KHL team Former teams: Avtomobilist Yekaterinburg; Lokomotiv Yaroslavl; HC Spartak Moscow; Torpedo Nizhny Novgorod
- Playing career: 2003–present

Evgeny Lobanov (born June 25, 1984) is a Russian professional ice hockey goaltender. He is currently playing for Avtomobilist Yekaterinburg of the Kontinental Hockey League.
