= Yakov Lobanov-Rostovsky (1760–1831) =

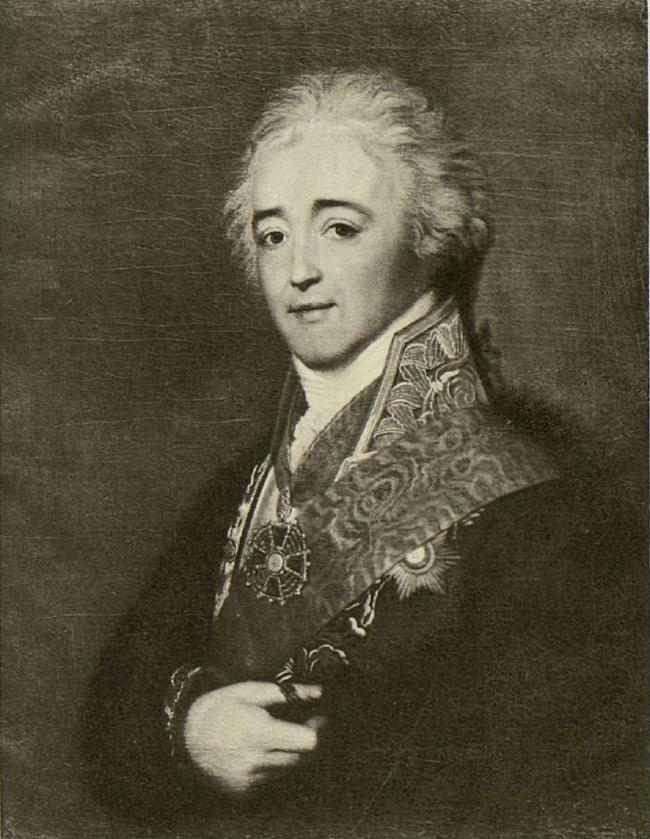
Yakov Lobanov-Rostovsky (1760-1831)

Prince Yakov Ivanovich Lobanov-Rostovsky (25 March 1760 – 18 January 1831) was a Russian statesman.

== Life ==
His father was captain of the Horse Guards and so in 1781 Yakov enlisted in Semyonov Regiment, where he served at the rank of captain. In 1784 he became a 'kammer-junker' and in 1793 a chamberlain. Thanks to his good connections, in 1794 he was appointed Chief Procurator to the Senate Department, then to a post in Moscow to oversee the affairs of the Senate department, the theatres and the government offices. On the accession of Alexander I of Russia, Lobanov-Rostovsky was also appointed a senator and a member of the Moscow Board of Trustees.

In 1808 he was appointed governor-general of Little Russia and in 1810 was promoted to privy councillor in recognition of his work supplying food to the Moldavian army. In 1812, to face the French invasion of Russia, he formed 17 Cossack regiments in Little Russia on his own initiative - these were deployed to Tula and Kaluga and so to protect Little Russia he also raised a national militia.

On 22 February 1816 he was appointed to the State Council and on 20 April the same year was appointed to the committee of petitions filed to the superior. In 1820 he withdrew from the latter position. By 1827 he had also been appointed chairman of the law department and a member of the Committee of Ministers. In 1827 he was appointed chairman of the Department of Civil and Religious Affairs of the State Council, and in 1829 was made chief chamberlain.

== Sources ==
- Russian Biographical Dictionary (vol 25), edited by Alexander Polovtsov. 1896–1918.
