= Lobanovo, Sudogodsky District, Vladimir Oblast =

Lobanovo Лобаново
- Village
- Location within Vladimir Oblast Location within Russia
- Coordinates: 56°00′N 40°48′E
- Country: Russia
- Region: Vladimir Oblast
- District: Sudogodsky District
- Time zone: UTC+3:00

Lobanovo (Russian: Лобаново) is a rural locality (a village) in Lavrovskoye Rural Settlement, Sudogodsky District, Vladimir Oblast, Russia. The population was 27 as of 2010.

== Geography ==
Lobanovo is located 11 km northwest of Sudogda (the district's administrative centre) by road. Ovtsyno is the nearest rural locality.
