= Andrey Lobanov-Rostovsky =

Andrey Anatolyevich Lobanov-Rostovsky (Russian: Лобанов-Ростовский, Андрей Анатольевич) (May 5, 1892 – February 17, 1979) was officer of the Russian Imperial Army, and took part in World War I. During the Russian Civil War he was part of the anti-Bolshevik White movement.

In 1920 he went into emigration and studied at the Institut des Sciences Politiques of the University of Paris. In 1930 he came to the United States, started teaching at the University of California at Los Angeles and eventually became full professor of history. In 1945 he moved the University of Michigan, where he taught until his retirement in 1962.

== Books ==
- 1933: Russia and Asia
- 1935: The Grinding Mill (memoirs)
- 1947: Russia and Europe, 1789-1825
- 1954: Russia and Europe, 1825-1878
