= Nikita Ivanovich Lobanov-Rostovsky =

'Nikita Ivanovich Lobanov-Rostovsky (Russian: Никита Иванович Лобанов-Ростовский) (died 1658) was a Russian statesman and military leader during the reigns of tsars Michael of Russia and Alexis of Russia.

He served at the courts of tsars Michael and Alexis, voivode in Krapivin, Tsarevo-Alekseev (Царево-Алексеев). He took part in assaults on Poland. In 1658 he was promoted to the rank of okolnichy.
