= Lev Lyubimov =

Russian journalist and art historian (1902–1976)

Lev Dmitriyevich Lybimov (Russian: Лев Дмитриевич Любимов; 31 July 1902, Tula, Russia – 1 January 1976) was a Russian journalist, writer and art historian; author of the book of recollections entitled “Na chuzbine” («На чужбине», 'In a Strange/Foreign Land'). Lyubimov was a White emigre but returned to Russia after World War II.

== Biography ==
Lev Dmitriyevich Lyubimov was a son of Dmitry Lyubimov, an assistant of the secretary of state of the State Council. In 1919 emigrated to France. He worked (until 1940) for Milyukov's newspaper “Vozrozhdeniye” («Возрождение», 'Rebirth'). During the Nazi occupation of France, Lyubimov resided in Paris.

In 1945, he joined the Union of Russian Patriots and contributed to their newspaper "Soviet Patriot" in Paris. In 1946, he was one of the first White emigres to receive the Soviet passport. In November 1947, he was arrested by the French police and together with a number of other emigres who had had the Soviet citizenship instated, he was deported to the Soviet occupation zone of Germany. From there, Lev Lyubimov moved to the USSR. From 1948 on, he lived and worked in Moscow.

He published a number of books European and Russian art (incl. ancient Russia). He is also the author of the book of recollections «Na chuzhbine» (1963), in which he describes the figures of Russian emigration, e.g. Kuprin, Bunin, Rakhmaninov, Alechin.

Lev Dmitriyevich Lyubimov died in 1976.
