= Lobanovo, Selivanovsky District, Vladimir Oblast =

Lobanovo Лобаново
- Village
- Location within Vladimir Oblast Location within Russia
- Coordinates: 55°47′N 41°45′E
- Country: Russia
- Region: Vladimir Oblast
- District: Selivanovsky District
- Time zone: UTC+3:00

Lobanovo (Russian: Лобаново) is a rural locality (a village) in Novlyanskoye Rural Settlement, Selivanovsky District, Vladimir Oblast, Russia. The population was 151 as of 2010. There are 3 streets.

== Geography ==
Lobanovo is located 9 km south of Krasnaya Gorbatka (the district's administrative centre) by road. Novlyanka is the nearest rural locality.
