= Lobanovo, Kichmengsko-Gorodetsky District, Vologda Oblast =

Lobanovo Лобаново
- Village
- Location within Vologda Oblast Location within Russia
- Coordinates: 60°02′N 45°50′E
- Country: Russia
- Region: Vologda Oblast
- District: Kichmengsko-Gorodetsky District
- Time zone: UTC+3:00

Lobanovo (Russian: Лобаново) is a rural locality (a village) in Kichmegnskoye Rural Settlement, Kichmengsko-Gorodetsky District, Vologda Oblast, Russia. The population was 64 as of 2002.

== Geography ==
Lobanovo is located 7 km northeast of Kichmengsky Gorodok (the district's administrative centre) by road. Sloboda is the nearest rural locality.
