= Alexander Lobanov (serial killer) =

Russian serial killer and rapist (1979-2002)

Alexander Leonidovich Lobanov
- Born: 1979; Perm, Perm Oblast, RSFSR
- Died: March 6, 2002 (aged 23); SIZO-1, Perm, Perm Krai, Russia
- Cause of death: Suicide by hanging
- Other names: "The Motovilikha Maniac" "The Perm Ripper" "The Perm Chikatilo"
- Convictions: Murder ×5; Rape ×5
- Penalty: Life imprisonment

Details
- Victims: 5
- Span of crimes: 1999–2001
- Country: Russia
- State: Perm
- Date apprehended: June 5, 2001

Alexander Leonidovich Lobanov (1979 – March 6, 2002), known as the Motovilikha Maniac (Russian: Мотовилихинский маньяк, romanized: Motovilikhinsky manyak), was a Russian serial killer and rapist who raped and murdered five girls and women in Perm's Motovilikhinsky City District from 1999 to 2001. Convicted and sentenced to life imprisonment for the crimes, Lobanov committed suicide in a detention center while awaiting for his sentence to be officially confirmed.

== Early life ==
Alexander Leonidovich Lobanov was born in Perm in 1979, the second of two children. He grew up in an average family, with his dad being a teacher and his mother looking after the children, and displayed no deviant or violent behavior while growing up. This all changed in 1996, when his mother died from a brain tumor, with the trauma from this event leading to Lobanov developing emotional issues.

A year later, Lobanov was drafted into the Russian Ground Forces and dispatched for military duty in Sakhalin. It is suspected that Lobanov suffered some sort of abuse at the hands of other soldiers, but as he refused to talk about his time there, so this remains speculative. After completing his service, Lobanov returned to Perm, where he started behaving aggressively towards others and became very withdrawn. His father also noticed that he started exhibiting odd behavior, with one particular instance being him posing with two fellow soldiers brandishing an axe and staring into the camera. Around this time, he made several attempts to approach women, but was rejected each time and was even beaten up by the women's boyfriends if he pestered them. Subsequently, Lobanov became a misogynist and decided to start committing murders.

== Murders ==
Lobanov's modus operandi consisted of seeking out pretty young girls and women in the Motovilikhinsky City District and approaching them to talk, often at night. If he perceived that the victim slighted him in any way, he would lure or force her into a crowded area (or, in the case of the last two victims, into his apartment), where he would attack. During the murders he demonstrated a tendency for sadism, inflicting a large number of injuries on the victims, intentionally prolonging their suffering by inflicting superficial and non-fatal wounds, mutilating their faces, and raping them.

The first murder occurred on October 4, 1999, when he met a 32-year-old woman in a courtyard on Raboche-Krestyanskaya Street and drank some beer with her. At some point, she suggested that Lobanov beat up two men in her apartment, but he refused, after which the woman began to make rude remarks about him. Enraged, Lobanov hit her several times with his fists and a glass bottle, then dragged her into a garage where he raped her, cut her carotid artery and severed her jugular vein with the broken bottle shards. He then beat her up one last time and left her to bleed to death.

The next crime occurred on October 11, not far from the first crime scene. Using the same method, Lobanov met up with a 23-year-old woman on Chernyshevsky Street and offered to accompany her on a walk. After some time, he invited her to visit his apartment, but she refused. After this, Lobanov lured her to the Iskra Cinema, where he raped, beat and strangled her to death with a belt.

On the night of March 2, 2000, Lobanov was on a tram riding through Gagarin Boulevard when he noticed an 18-year-old girl getting off on the Vagonoremontny Zavod stop. He followed her and invited her out, but she refused to talk with him. In response, Lobanov pulled out a scalpel he was carrying with him and put it up to the young woman's throat, before forcing her to the nearby garages, where he started hitting her with both his fists and the scalpel, inflicting a total of 97 stab wounds on the victim's body.

On December 17, Lobanov invited a 19-year-old girl he had met at the Sadovy mini-market into his apartment where, after drinking alcohol together, he propositioned to have sex with her. The girl rejected him, and then started insulting and humiliating him, even cutting his hand with a razor. Lobanov went to the bathroom, washed off the blood and, taking a cast-iron bucket from the sink, returned to the victim and hit her approximately 45 times with it. He then cut her throat so deeply that he reached the cervical vertebrae, and raped the woman's corpse. After finishing, he placed it in a bag and discarded it in a trash can near his apartment before covering up the bloodstains on the walls with a carpet and some pictures. Shortly after this murder, Lobanov suffered a breakdown and realized that he was a danger to others, and immediately decided to apply for treatment at a psychiatric hospital.

After spending some time in the hospital, Lobanov was released and returned to his home. On June 5, 2001, he invited 25-year-old Anna K. to his apartment to drink alcohol together, during which the woman started making cynical remarks about him. Lobanov then started hitting her on the head with a rod covered with a rubber hose and stabbing her with a folding knife a total of 14 times, before eventually disemboweling her and removing her internal organs.

== Arrest, investigation and trial ==
After the final murder, Lobanov fell asleep and woke up in the afternoon. Realizing that his father would return soon and that he had no time to hide the corpse or traces of the murder, he attempted suicide by eating a handful of aminazine tablets and slashing his wrists, but he managed to survive. His father eventually returned and upon seeing the scene, he called an ambulance. After receiving prompt medical attention, Lobanov was detained and questioned, whereupon he immediately confessed to all the murders, but tried to place the blame on the victims, claiming that they had "hurt [his] male dignity".

A subsequent psychiatric examination found that he was sane, despite psychiatrists noting that he was a sadist and necrophile. In one conversation with the examining psychiatrist, Lobanov claimed that killing had become a psychological need for him, and he periodically felt an irresistible urge to kill. When his room was searched, investigators found a notebook with poems which he dedicated to his love of women, as well as drawings of naked women.

In December 2001, the Perm Regional Court found Lobanov guilty on all counts and sentenced him to life imprisonment. On March 6, 2002, before the sentence came into legal force, Lobanov hanged himself in the cell of the detention center.

== See also ==
- List of Russian serial killers

== In the media and culture ==
- The episode "Maniac Lobanov" (Russian: Маньяк Лобанов) from the series "Challenge 02" (Russian: Вызов 02), published in 2002

== Books ==
- Antoine Casse and Irina Kapitanova (2023). The phenomenon of Russian maniacs. The first large-scale study of maniacs and serial killers from the times of tsarism, the USSR and the Russian Federation (Russian: Феномен российских маньяков. Первое масштабное исследование маньяков и серийных убийц времен царизма, СССР и РФ), Eksmo, ISBN 978-5-04-608118-3
