= Alexander Lobanov (artist) =

Russian painter (1924–2003)

- Born: 30 August 1924
- Died: 21 April 2003 (aged 78)
- Known for: Paintings, sculptures

Alexander Pavlovich Lobanov (Russian: Алекса́ндр Па́влович Лоба́нов; 30 August 1924 – April 2003) was a Russian outsider artist known particularly for his detailed self-portraits, noted for their frequent inclusion of guns and for their self-aggrandizing nature.

== Early years ==
Born in Mologa in 1924, Lobanov contracted meningitis before five years old and was left deaf and mute. In 1937, his family was relocated from their home town of Mologa to make way for the construction of the Rybinsk Reservoir, forcing him to abandon his studies at the school for the deaf he was attending. A very rebellious and aggressive child, and having lost his access to support and rehabilitation, he became increasingly volatile until his family had him confined to a mental asylum in the nearby city of Yaroslavl in 1945. During the first years of hospitalization, his violence and aggression remained until he became withdrawn and increasingly solitary.

== Artistic works ==
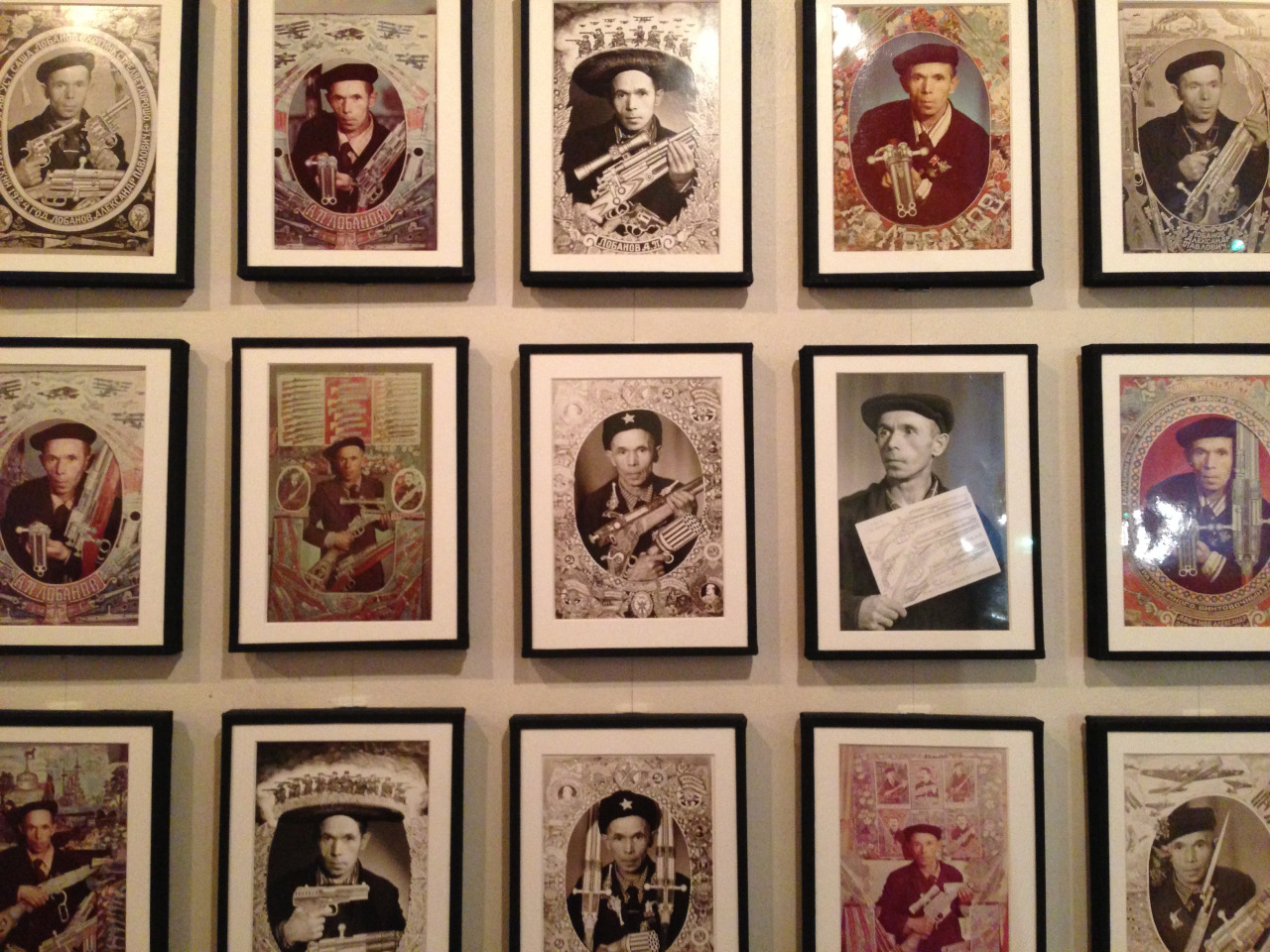
Work by Alexander Pavlovich Lobanov

Following this change in his behavior, Alexander was transferred to a less restrictive hospital in 1953. It was there that he was introduced to drawing by himself. For over fifty years he produced hundreds of works with very little variety in style or content. His tools were consistent, staying with ink, pencil, coloring pencils, and felt-tip pens throughout the years. His subject matter strayed little from his taste for detailed self-portraits, often with himself being portrayed similarly to Russian revolutionary icons, almost always carrying or surrounded by rifles, machine guns, swords, and other various weapons. Hunting dogs and hunted animals, such as birds and deer, were often depicted with Lobanov being accompanied by groups of other hunters.

Lobanov made frequent references to the psychiatric institution or staff surrounding him, including a portrait of himself as a young boy shooting a male nurse with a revolver, and a depiction of his institution with enormous rifles acting as support columns. In the 1970s, Lobanov took an intense interest in photography. His photographic portraits were similar to his drawings as he would stage himself, creating his own environment and firearms from cardboard paper with ornaments and communist symbols drawn onto the prints.

== Later years ==
Over the years, Lobanov's drawings numbered in the hundreds, and Dr. Gavrilov helped organize showings of his work and others' works; first to local universities and psychiatrists, and then by the help of Dominique de Miscault in French museums and international galleries. In 2001 a short documentary, Alexandre Pavlovitch Lobanov, was made by the French filmmaker Bruno Decharme.

Lobanov died in April 2003 in an asylum near Yaroslavl.

== External links and sources ==
- Translated French article on his life and work
- Article on Lobanov
- Alexandre Pavlovitch Lobanov at IMDb
- Watch the "Alexandre Pavlovitch Lobanov" documentary on Bruno Decharme's website
- Allexander Lobanov in Boguemskaia-Turchin collection
