= February Revolution =

First of two 1917 revolutions in Russia

- Part of the Russian Revolution and the Revolutions of 1917–1923
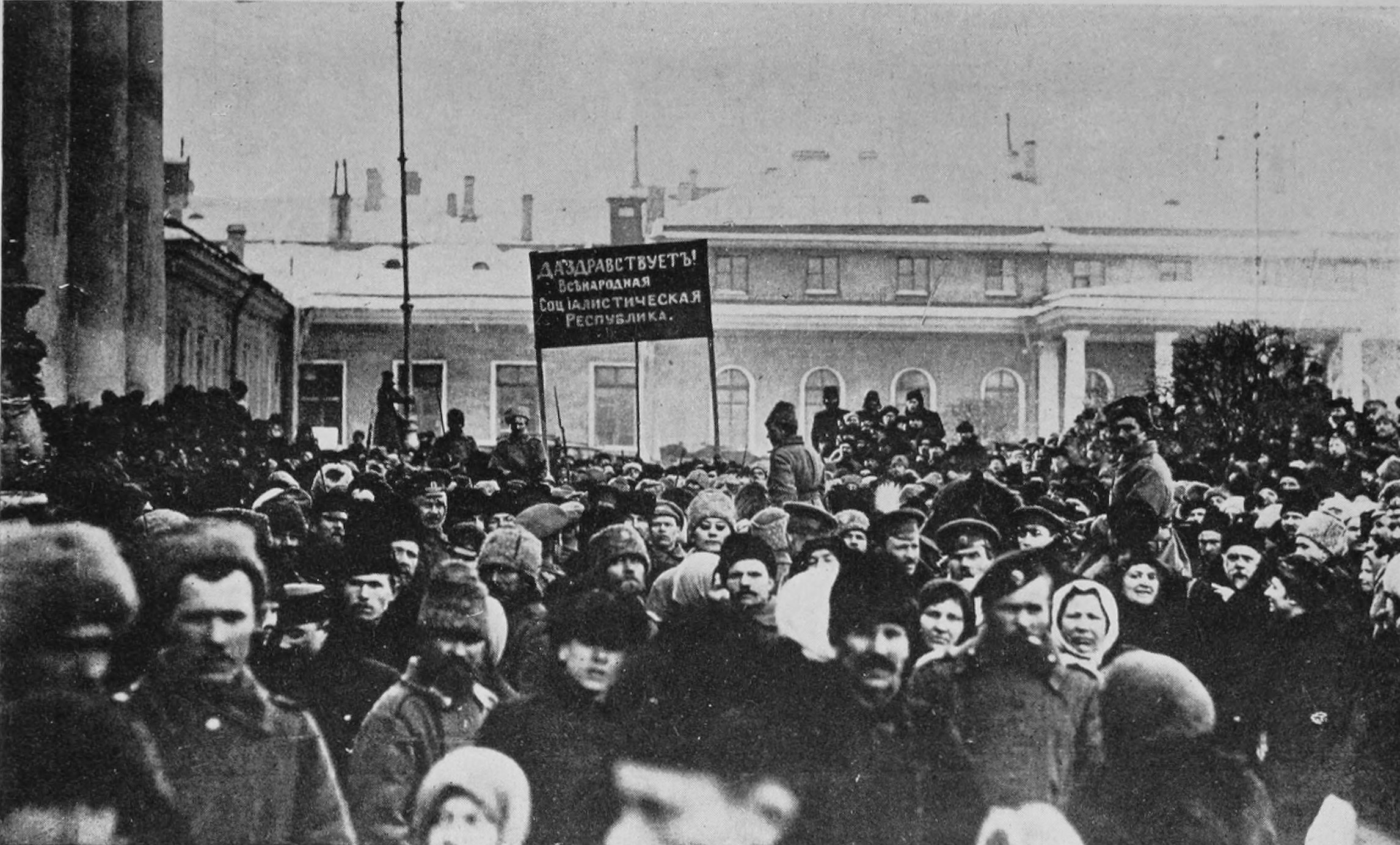
- Protests in Petrograd, March 1917
Date	8–16 March 1917 [O.S. 23 Feb – 3 Mar.]
Location	Petrograd, Russian Empire
Result	Revolutionary victory; Abdication of Nicholas II; End of the Russian Empire; Proclamation of the Russian Republic; Period of dual power between the Provisional Government and the Petrograd Soviet; October Revolution and start of the Russian Civil War

Belligerents
Russian Imperial Government; Petrograd Police; Gendarmes; Ministry of Internal Affairs; Petrograd Garrison; Monarchists: Russian Assembly; Monarchist Union; Union of the Russian Nation	Socialists: Socialist Revolutionary Party; Russian Social Democratic Labour Party (Bolsheviks); Russian Social Democratic Labour Party (Mensheviks); Dashnaks; Liberals: Kadets; Octobrists; Progressive Party

Commanders and leaders
Nicholas II (surrendered); Nikolai Golitsyn; Alexander Kutepov; Sergey Khabalov; Mikhail Belyaev; Nikolai Ivanov; Alexander Protopopov; Vladimir Purishkevich; Alexander Dubrovin	Alexander Kerensky; Viktor Chernov; Yury Lomonosov; Nikolay Chkheidze; Julius Martov; Alexander Shliapnikov; Nikolay Tolmachyov; Stepan Shahumyan; (Russia) Georgy Lvov; (Russia) Pavel Miliukov; (Russia) Alexander Guchkov; (Russia) Mikhail Rodzianko

Strength
Petrograd Police: 3,500	Unknown

Casualties and losses
- 1,443 killed in Petrograd

The February Revolution (Russian: Февральская революция), known in Soviet historiography as the February Bourgeois Democratic Revolution, (Note: Russian: Февральская буржуазно-демократическая революция, romanized: Fevral'skaya Burzhuazno-demokraticheskaya revolyutsiya, Russian pronunciation: [fʲɪˈvralʲskəjə bʊrʐʊˈaznə dʲɪməkrɐˈtʲitɕɪskəjə rʲɪvɐˈlʲutsɨjə]) and sometimes as the March Revolution, (Note: The revolution occurred in March according to the Western calendar, and in February according to the calendar Russia was using at the time.) was the first of two revolutions which took place in Russia in 1917.

The main events of the revolution took place in and near Petrograd (now Saint Petersburg), the capital of Russia at the time, where long-standing discontent with the monarchy erupted into mass protests against food rationing on 23 February Old Style (8 March New Style). Revolutionary activity lasted about eight days, involving mass demonstrations and violent armed clashes with police and gendarmes, the last loyal forces of the Russian monarchy. On 27 February O.S. (12 March N.S.), most of the forces of the capital's garrison sided with the revolutionaries. On the same day, the Russian Provisional Government, made up of left-leaning Duma members, was formed. It seized the railway telegraph and issued orders claiming that the Duma now controlled the government. This was followed by a second telegram prohibiting trains from traveling near Petrograd, ensuring that troops loyal to the Tsar could not arrive by rail. Three days later, Nicholas II, stranded on his train in the city of Pskov after failing to reach the capital, was forced to abdicate, ending Romanov dynastic rule. The Provisional Government under Georgy Lvov replaced the Council of Ministers of Russia.

The Provisional Government proved deeply unpopular and was forced to share dual power with the Petrograd Soviet. After the July Days, in which the government killed hundreds of protesters, Alexander Kerensky became the head of the government. He was unable to resolve Russia's immediate problems, including food shortages and mass unemployment, as he attempted to keep Russia involved in the ever more unpopular world war. The failures of the Provisional Government led to the October Revolution by the communist Bolsheviks later that year. The erosion of authority in Russia caused by the February Revolution, further exacerbated by the October Revolution, resulted in the Russian Civil War and the eventual formation of the Soviet Union.

The revolution appeared to have broken out without any real leadership or formal planning. Russia had been suffering from a number of economic and social problems, which compounded after the start of World War I in 1914. Disaffected soldiers from the city's garrison (which by then was composed by draftees with low morale, the more disciplined troops being at the front) joined bread rioters, primarily women in bread lines, and industrial strikers on the streets. As more and more troops of the undisciplined garrison of the capital deserted, and with loyal troops away at the Eastern Front, the city fell into chaos, leading to the Tsar's decision to abdicate under his generals' advice, assuming it was the best decision for the ultimate victory in the war efforts. In all, over 1,300 people were killed during the protests of February 1917. The historiographical reasons for the revolution have varied. Russian historians writing during the time of the Soviet Union cited the anger of the proletariat against the bourgeois boiling over as the cause. Russian liberals cited World War I. Revisionists tracked it back to land disputes after the serf era. Modern historians cite a combination of these factors and criticize mythologization of the event.

== Etymology ==
Despite occurring in March of the Gregorian calendar, the event is most commonly known as the "February Revolution" because at the time Russia still used the Julian calendar. The event is sometimes known as the "March Revolution," after the Soviet Union modernized its calendar.

== Causes ==
A number of factors contributed to the February Revolution, both short and long-term. Historians disagree on the main factors that contributed to this. Liberal historians emphasise the turmoil created by the war, whereas Marxists emphasise the inevitability of change. Alexander Rabinowitch summarises the main long-term and short-term causes:

"The February 1917 revolution ... grew out of pre-war political and economic instability, technological backwardness, and fundamental social divisions, coupled with gross mismanagement of the war effort, continuing military defeats, domestic economic dislocation, and outrageous scandals surrounding the monarchy."

=== Long-term causes ===
Despite its occurrence during the height of World War I, the roots of the February Revolution extended much further back. Chief among these was Imperial Russia's failure, throughout the 19th and early 20th centuries, to modernize its archaic social, economic, and political structures while preserving popular loyalty to an increasingly outmoded autocracy. As historian Richard Pipes writes, ..."the incompatibility of capitalism and autocracy struck all who gave thought to the matter."

The first major event of the Russian Revolution was the February Revolution of 1917, a chaotic uprising fueled by over a century of civil and military unrest between the common people and the Tsarist regime. Among the long-term causes were the harsh treatment of peasants by landowners, poor working conditions for industrial laborers, and the spread of Western democratic ideals by political activists. These developments contributed to a growing political and social consciousness among the lower classes.

Dissatisfaction among the proletariat was compounded by food shortages and military failures. These factors, along with the massacre on Bloody Sunday and Russia's humiliating defeat in the Russo-Japanese War, culminated in the Revolution of 1905.

=== Short-term causes ===
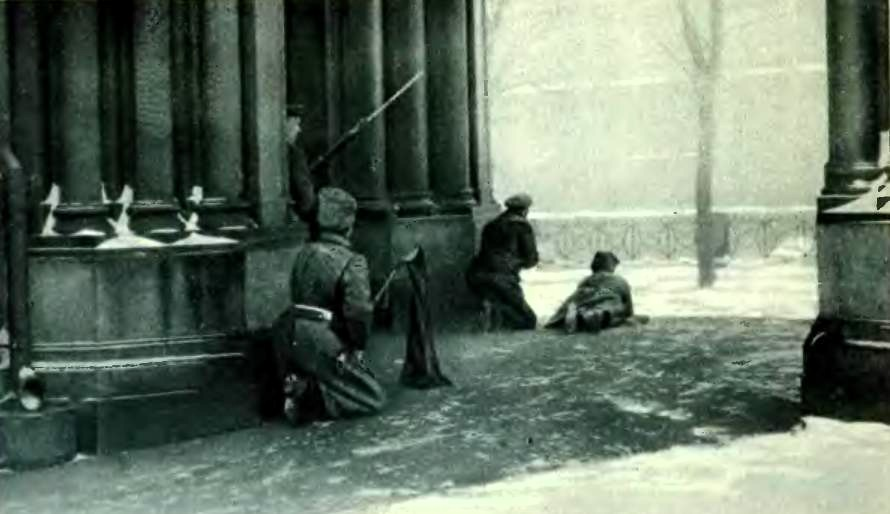
Students and soldiers firing across the Moyka at the police

The 1917 Revolution was provoked by Russian military failures during the First World War. In August 1914, all classes supported and virtually all political deputies voted in favour of the war. (Note: Of 422, only 21 voted against.) The declaration of war was followed by a revival of nationalism across Russian society, which temporarily reduced internal strife. The army achieved some early victories (such as in Galicia in 1915 and with the Brusilov Offensive in 1916) but also suffered major defeats, notably Tannenberg in August 1914, the Winter Battle in Masuria in February 1915 and the loss of Russian Poland during May to August 1915. By early 1917, the Russian military had suffered catastrophic losses: approximately 1.7 million killed, 4.95 million wounded, and around 2.5 million missing or taken prisoner, totaling about 9.15 million casualties. Mutinies sprang up more often (most due to simple war-weariness), morale was at its lowest, and the newly called-up officers and commanders were at times very incompetent. Like all major armies, Russia's armed forces had inadequate supply. The pre-revolution desertion rate ran at around 34,000 a month. Meanwhile, the wartime alliance of industry, the Duma (lower house of parliament) and the Stavka (Military High Command) started to work outside the Tsar's control.

In an attempt to boost morale and repair his reputation as a leader, Tsar Nicholas announced in the summer of 1915 that he would take personal command of the army, in defiance of almost universal advice to the contrary. The result was disastrous on three grounds. Firstly, it associated the monarchy with the unpopular war; secondly, Nicholas proved to be a poor leader of men on the front, often irritating his own commanders with his interference; and thirdly, being at the front made him unavailable to govern. This left the reins of power to his wife, the German Tsarina Alexandra, who was unpopular and accused of being a German spy, and under the thumb of her confidant – Grigori Rasputin, himself so unpopular that he was assassinated by members of the nobility in December 1916. The Tsarina proved an ineffective ruler in a time of war, announcing a rapid succession of different Prime Ministers and angering the Duma. The lack of strong leadership is illustrated by a telegram from Octobrist politician Mikhail Rodzianko to the Tsar on 26 February O.S. (11 March N.S) 1917, in which Rodzianko begged for a minister with the "confidence of the country" be instated immediately. Delay, he wrote, would be "tantamount to death".

On the home front, a famine loomed and commodities became scarce due to the overstretched railroad network. Meanwhile, refugees from German-occupied Russia came in their millions. The Russian economy, which had just seen one of the highest growth rates in Europe, was blocked from the continent's markets by the war. Though industry did not collapse, it was considerably strained and when inflation soared, wages could not keep up. The Duma, which was composed of liberal deputies, warned Tsar Nicholas II of the impending danger and counselled him to form a new constitutional government, like the one he had dissolved after some short-term attempts in the aftermath of the 1905 Revolution. The Tsar ignored the advice. Historian Edward Acton argues that "by stubbornly refusing to reach any modus vivendi with the Progressive Bloc of the Duma... Nicholas undermined the loyalty of even those closest to the throne [and] opened an unbridgeable breach between himself and the public opinion." In short, the Tsar no longer had the support of the military, the nobility or the Duma (collectively the élites), or the Russian people. The inevitable result was revolution.

== Events ==
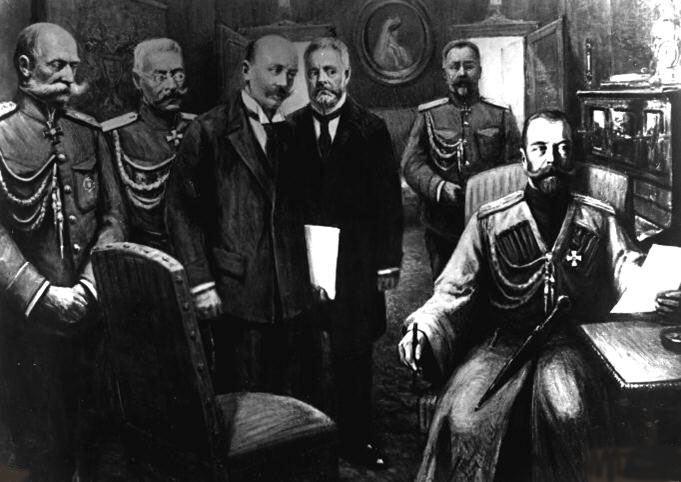
The abdication of Nicholas II on 2 March 1917 O.S. In the royal train: Minister of the Court Baron Fredericks, General N. Ruzsky, V. V. Shulgin, A. I. Guchkov, Nicholas II. (State Historical Museum)

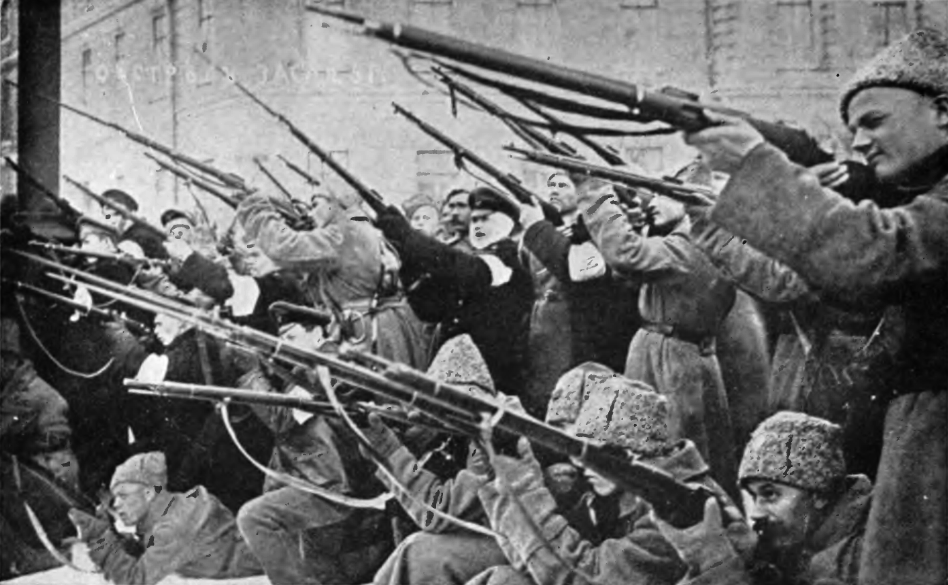
Revolutionaries during the first days of the revolution

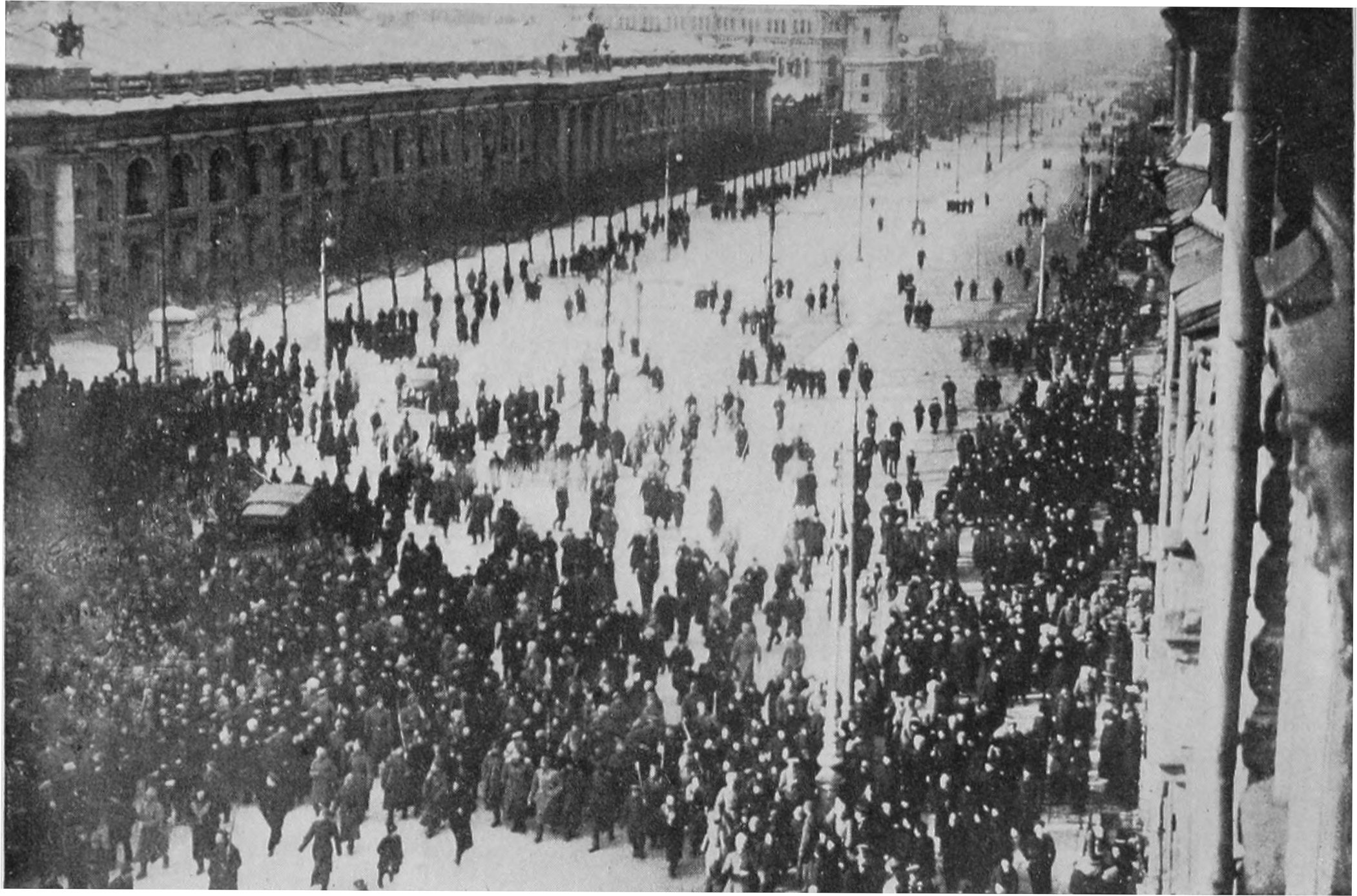
Protesters on the Nevsky Prospekt

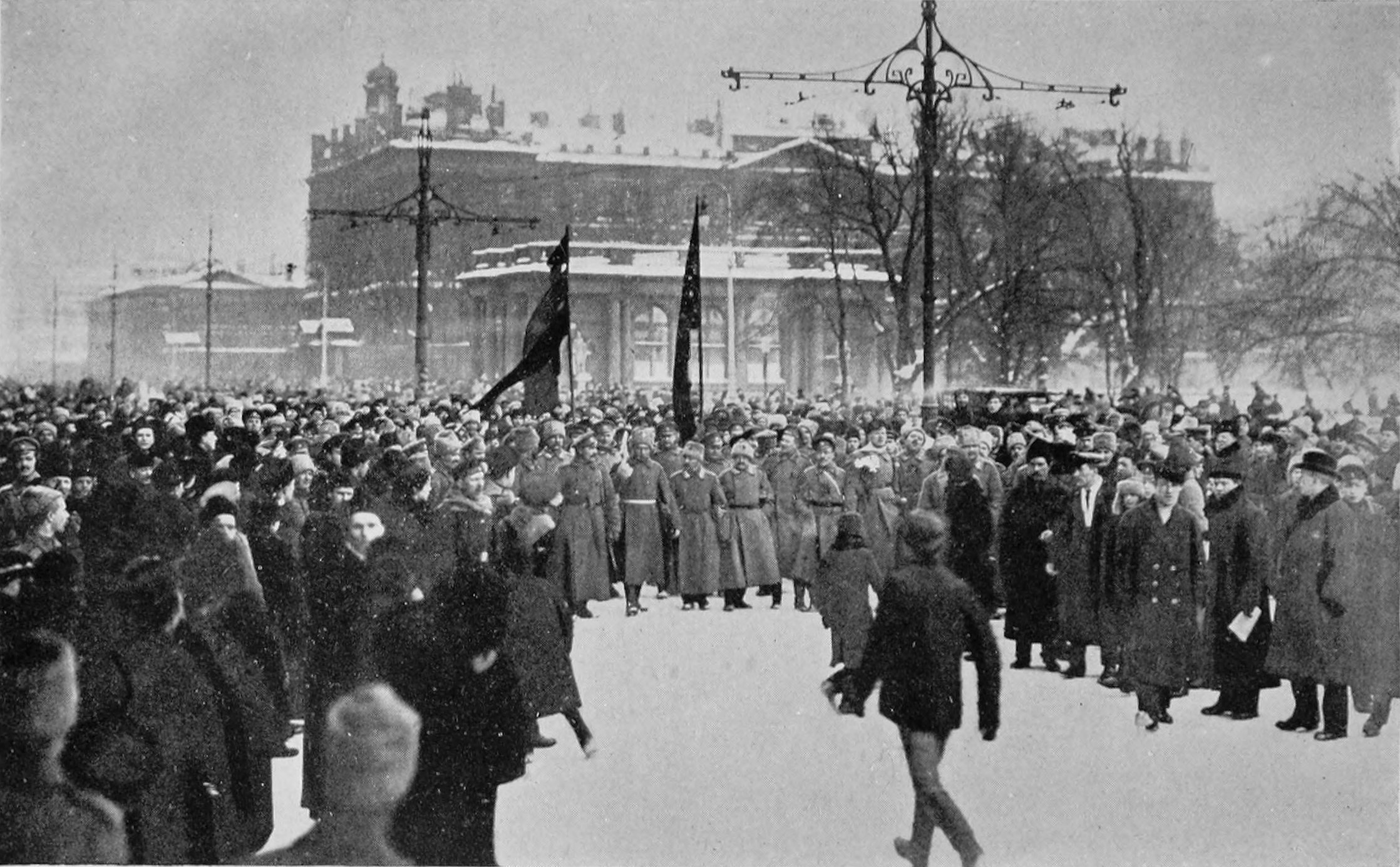
Crowd on the Nevsky Prospekt

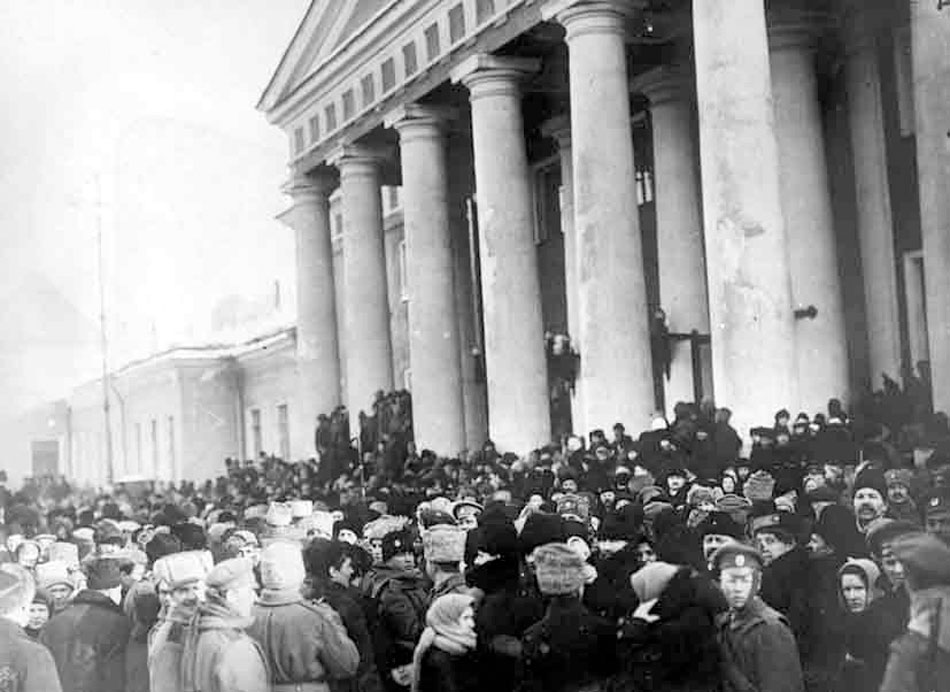
Gathering at the Tauride Palace

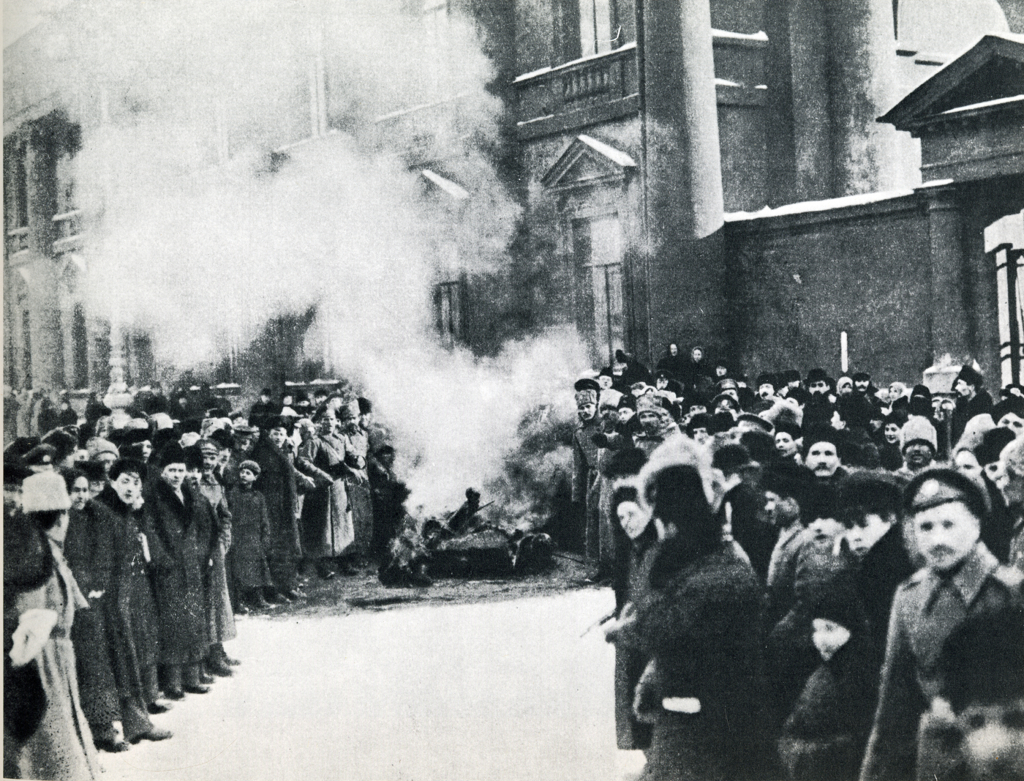
Burning of monarchical symbols on 27 February (O.S.)

=== Towards the February Revolution ===
When Rasputin was assassinated on 30 December 1916, and the assassins went unchallenged, this was interpreted as an indication of the truth of the accusation that Nicholas' wife relied on Rasputin (a Siberian starets.) The authority of the tsar, who now stood as a moral weakling, sank further. On 9 January 1917 [O.S. 27 December 1916] the Emperor dismissed his Prime Minister, Alexander Trepov. On 11 January 1917 [O.S. 29 December 1916] a hesitant Nikolai Golitsyn became the successor of Trepov. Golitsyn begged the Emperor to cancel his appointment, citing his lack of preparation for the role of Prime Minister. On 16 January [O.S. 3 January] 1917 Mikhail Belyaev succeeded Dmitry Shuvayev (who did not speak any foreign language) as Minister of War, likely at the request of the Empress.

"In the seventeen months of the 'Tsarina's rule', from September 1915 to February 1917, Russia had four Prime Ministers, five Ministers of the Interior, three Foreign Ministers, three War Ministers, three Ministers of Transport and four Ministers of Agriculture. This "ministerial leapfrog", as it came to be known, not only removed competent men from power, but also disorganized the work of government since no one remained long enough in office to master their responsibilities."

The Duma President Mikhail Rodzianko, Grand Duchess Marie Pavlovna and British ambassador Buchanan joined calls for Alexandra to be removed from influence, but Nicholas still refused to take their advice. Many people came to the conclusion that the problem was not Rasputin. According to Rodzianko the Empress "exerts an adverse influence on all appointments, including even those in the army." On 24 January N.S. (11 January O.S.) the Duma opening was postponed to the 7th (25th February O.S.).

On 27 January N.S. (14 January O.S.) Georgy Lvov proposed to Grand Duke Nicholas Nikolaevich that he (the Grand Duke) should take control of the country. At the end of January/beginning of February major negotiations took place between the Allied powers in Petrograd; unofficially they sought to clarify the internal situation in Russia.

On 8 February, at the wish of the Tsar, Nikolay Maklakov, together with Interior Minister Alexander Protopopov, drafted the text of the manifesto on the dissolution of the Duma (before it was opened on 14 February 1917). The Duma was dissolved and Protopopov was proclaimed dictator.

=== Initial protests ===
By 1917, the majority of Petersburgers had lost faith in the Tsarist regime. Government corruption was unrestrained, and Tsar Nicholas II had frequently disregarded the Imperial Duma. Thousands of workers flooded the streets of Petrograd (modern St. Petersburg) to show their dissatisfaction. The first major protest of the February Revolution occurred on 18 February O.S. (3 March N.S) as workers of Putilov Factory, Petrograd's largest industrial plant, announced a strike to demonstrate against the government. Strikes continued on the following days. Due to heavy snowstorms, tens of thousands of freight cars were stuck on the rails, with food and coal. On 22 February O.S. (7 March N.S.) the Tsar left for the front.

=== Uprising ===
==== 23 February - 27 February ====
On 23 February O.S. (8 March N.S.), the Putilov Factory protesters were joined in the uprising by those celebrating International Women's Day and protesting against the government's food rationing. As the Russian government began rationing flour and bread, rumors of food shortages circulated and bread riots erupted across the city of Petrograd. Women, in particular, were passionate in showing their dissatisfaction with the rationing system, and the female workers marched to nearby factories to recruit over 50,000 workers for the strikes. Both men and women flooded the streets of Petrograd, demanding an end to Russian food shortages, the end of World War I, and the end of autocracy. By the following day 24 February O.S. (9 March N.S), nearly 200,000 protesters filled the streets, demanding the replacement of the Tsar with a more progressive political leader. They called for the war to end and for the Russian monarchy to be overthrown. By 25 February O.S (10 March N.S), nearly all industrial enterprises in Petrograd were shut down by the uprising. Although all gatherings on the streets were absolutely forbidden some 250,000 people were on strike. The Chairman of the Imperial Duma Rodzianko asked Prime Minister Golitsyn to resign; the minister of Foreign Affairs Nikolai Pokrovsky proposed the resignation of the whole government. There were disturbances on the Nevsky Prospect during the day.

The Tsar took action to address the riots on 25 February O.S (10 March N.S) by wiring garrison commander General Khabalov, an inexperienced and extremely indecisive commander of the Petrograd military district, to disperse the crowds with rifle fire and to suppress the "impermissible" rioting by force. On 26 February O.S (11 March N.S) the centre of the city was cordoned off on decree by Khabalov; schools and parks closed. Nikolai Pokrovsky reported about his negotiations with the Bloc (led by Interior Minister Maklakov) at the session of the Council of Ministers in the Mariinsky Palace. The Bloc spoke for the resignation of the government.

During the late afternoon of 26 February O.S (11 March N.S) the Fourth Company of the Pavlovsky Reserve Regiment broke out of their barracks upon learning that another detachment of the regiment had clashed with demonstrators near the Kazan Cathedral. After firing at mounted police the soldiers of the Fourth Company were disarmed by the Preobrazhensky Regiment. This marked the first instance of open mutiny in the Petrograd garrison. On 26 February O.S (11 March N.S) Mikhail Rodzianko, Chairman of the Duma, had sent the Tsar a report of the chaos in a telegram (exact wordings and translations differ, but each retains a similar sense):

The situation is serious. The capital is in a state of anarchy. The Government is paralyzed. Transport service and the supply of food and fuel have become completely disrupted. General discontent is growing ... There must be no delay. Any procrastination is tantamount to death.

— Rodzianko's first telegram to the Tsar, 11 March [O.S. 26 February] 1917.

Golitsyn received by telegraph a decree from the Tsar dissolving the Duma once again. Golitsyn used a (signed, but not yet dated) ukaze declaring that Nicholas had decided to interrupt the Duma until April, leaving it with no legal authority to act. (Note: On 8 February 1917 on request of the Emperor N. Maklakov and Protopopov drafted the text of a manifesto to dissolve the Duma (before it was opened on 14 February 1917).)

On the next day (27 February O.S, 12 March N.S), early in the morning, an armed uprising of part of the Petrograd garrison began. After the outbreak of the war, the Petrograd garrison's soldiers were mostly conscripts with low morale and little will to fight, while the loyal and battle-ready troops were stationed at or near the front. The general strike of workers received support from the soldiers. Soldiers from the rebellious regiments moved toward the city center, seized the Arsenal and city prisons, and released prisoners. Throughout the city, police officers and constables were being killed, while looting and marauding spread.

The Duma found itself in an ambiguous situation: on the one hand, it had received an order from Nicholas II for its own dissolution and feared the approach of a supposed "punitive expedition" to Petrograd. On the other hand, it was besieged by a crowd of revolutionary soldiers and workers who had come to the Tauride Palace, which at that moment served as the main center of opposition. As a result, the Progressive Bloc and leftist deputies (Trudoviks and Social Democrats) decided to formally comply with the dissolution order but still convene under the guise of a "private meeting." This private meeting of Duma members instructed the Council of Elders to elect a Provisional Committee of Duma Members and determine the future role of the State Duma in the unfolding events.

By the afternoon of February 27, 25,000 soldiers occupied the Duma the Council of Elders had established a governing body—the Provisional Committee of the State Duma ("Committee of State Duma Members for the Restoration of Order in the Capital and for Communication with Individuals and Institutions"), headed by M. V. Rodzianko. The Provisional Committee included representatives of parties affiliated with the "Progressive Bloc" as well as left-wing parties and the presidium of the State Duma.

As Pavel Milyukov later wrote,

The intervention of the State Duma gave the street and military movement a center, provided it with a banner and a slogan, and thus transformed the uprising into a revolution, which resulted in the overthrow of the old regime and the dynasty.

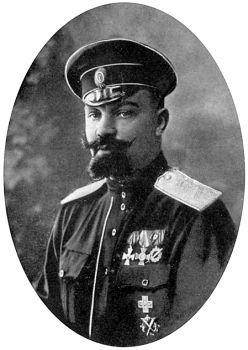
Colonel A. P. Kutepov was the only effective Military officer present at the capital during the revolution to attempt an actual counter revolutionary action

To oversee the administration of government ministries, the Provisional Committee appointed its own commissars and established various commissions, including military and food supply commissions. The appointed commissars began their duties immediately, with operations commencing on the evening of February 27 (March 12), 1917. From the evening of February 27 until March 2, the Provisional Committee claimed to act as the de facto supreme authority in Russia. However, its actual authority extended only to Petrograd, while the rest of the country remained relatively calm and loyal to the Monarchy. Nonetheless, in the capital, the Provisional Committee effectively assumed the powers of the Tsar.

Vasily Maklakov was appointed as one of the 24 commissars of the Provisional Committee of the State Duma. Its first meeting was on the same evening at the Mariinsky Palace and ordered the arrest of all the ex-ministers and senior officials, effectively marking the dissolution of the Council of Ministers. The Duma refused to head the revolutionary movement. At the same time, socialists also formed the Petrograd Soviet. In the Mariinsky Palace the Council of Ministers of Russia, assisted by Mikhail Rodzianko, held its last meeting. Protopopov was told to resign and offered to commit suicide.

General Khabalov attempted to organize resistance to the revolutionaries by forming a combined detachment of up to 1,000 men under the command of Colonel Alexander Kutepov; however, after several clashes with the crowd, due to the enormous numerical superiority of the armed workers, and severed communications with Khabalov, by the end of the day on February 27 he was forced to cease resistance to the rebels, and went into hiding. This was the only effective attempt to resist the revolution from within Petrograd.

By nightfall, Khabalov and his forces faced a capital controlled by revolutionaries. The protesters of Petrograd burned and sacked the premises of the district court, the headquarters of the secret police, and many police stations. They also occupied the Ministry of Transport, seized the arsenal, and released prisoners into the city. Army officers retreated into hiding and many took refuge in the Admiralty, but moved that night to the Winter Palace.

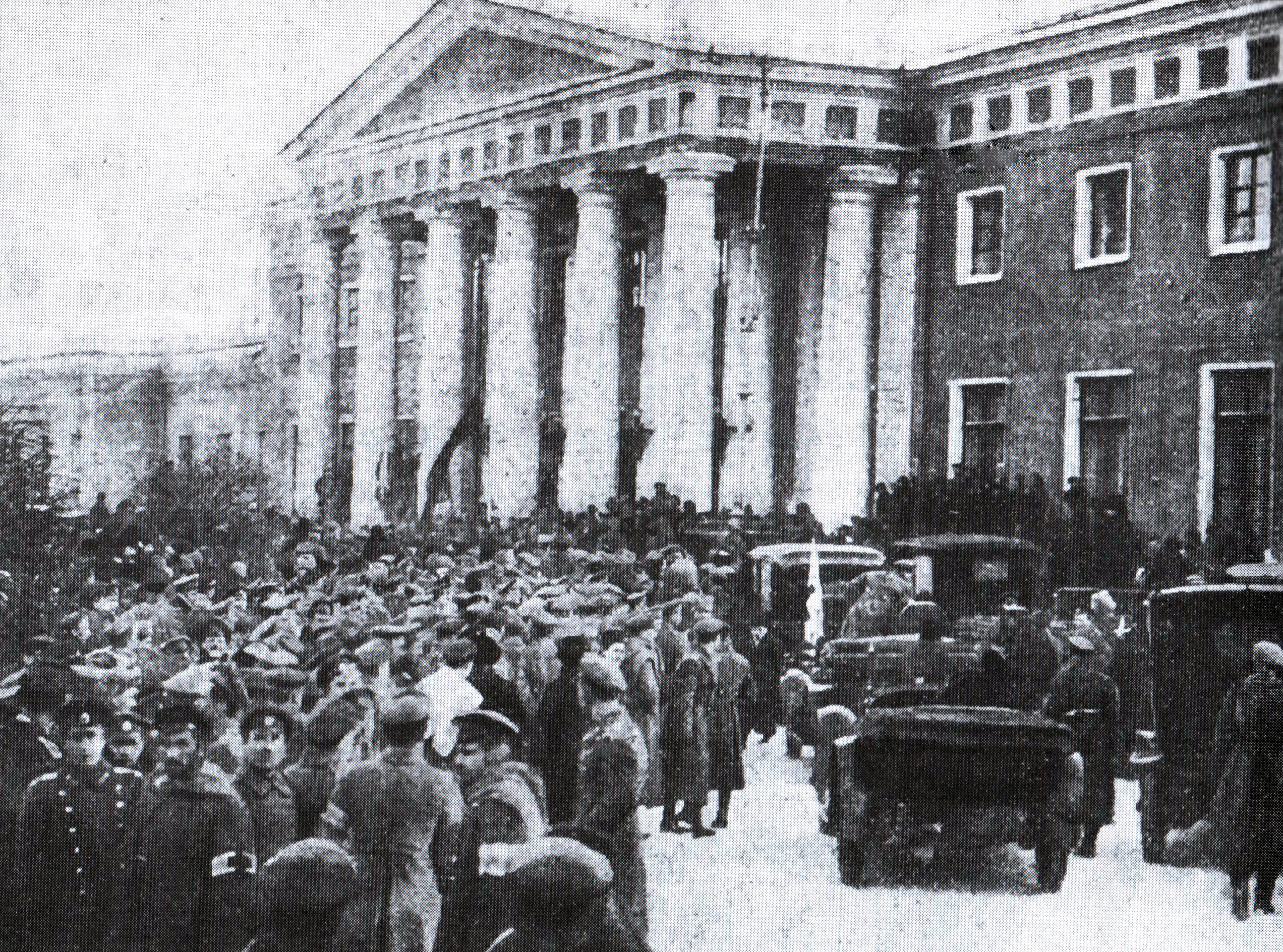
Gathering of the Duma on 1 March (O.S.)

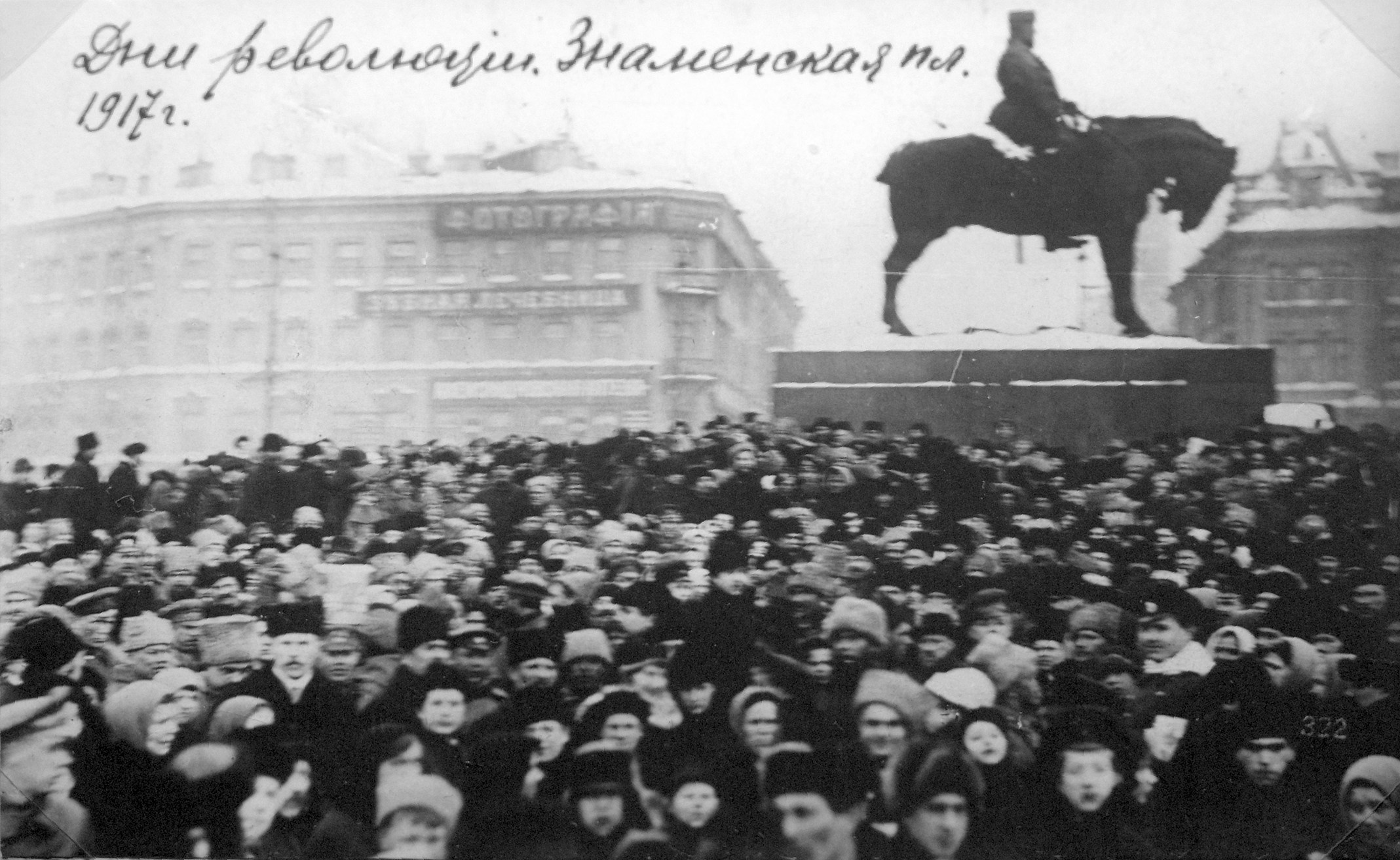
Protesters on Znamensky Square in front of the statue of Alexander III

Nicholas's response on 27 February O.S (12 March N.S), perhaps based on the Empress's earlier letter to him that the concern about Petrograd was an over-reaction, was one of irritation that "again, this fat Rodzianko has written me lots of nonsense, to which I shall not even deign to reply". Meanwhile, events unfolded in Petrograd. The bulk of the garrison mutinied, starting with the Volinsky Regiment. Soldiers of this regiment brought the Semyonovsky, Preobrazhensky, and Moskovsky Regiments out on the street to join the rebellion, resulting in the hunting down of police and the gathering of 40,000 rifles (at the Peter and Paul Fortress) which were dispersed among the workers.

=== February 28: Takeover by the Revolutionaries of Petrograd, Telegraph lines and railways ===
On the morning of February 28 (March 13), 1917, Alexander Bublikov, acting as a commissar of the Provisional Committee of the State Duma, was appointed by Rodzianko to the Ministry of the Ways of Communication, despite Rodzianko's claim to General Mikhail Alekseyev, chief of staff of the Imperial Army, that he was a supporter of the Monarchy. This was an important government position in the Revolution, as it coordinated train movements and military transport. He went to the Ministry Railways with the support of a detachment of mutinied soldiers, as understanding the strategic importance of controlling transportation and communication, the Provisional Government utilized the railway telegraph system to issue a directive that would prove to be paramount to the success of the revolution:

Railway workers! The old government, which had created devastation in all areas of state life, has proven powerless. The State Duma Committee, having taken over the equipment of the new government, appeals to you on behalf of the fatherland: the salvation of the motherland now depends on you. Train traffic must be maintained continuously with redoubled energy. The country expects more from you than the fulfillment of duty - it expects a feat. The weakness and inadequacy of technology on the Russian network must be compensated for by your selfless energy, love for the homeland and awareness of your role as transport for the war and improvement of the rear.

Shortly thereafter, another order was issued, prohibiting trains from traveling within 265 kilometers of Petrograd. This effectively made it extremely difficult, if not outright impossible, for loyalist troops to reach the capital and suppress the uprising.

According to Yury Lomonosov, this telegram played a decisive role during the Revolution's days:

by the morning of March 1, just two days before Nicholas II's abdication, all of Russia—or at least those areas within 10–15 versts of the railways—had learned that a revolution had taken place in Petrograd. From the battlefront to Vladivostok, from Murmansk to the Persian border, this telegram was received at every railway station. There was no doubt—the old regime had fallen, and a new one had been born.

After this, the abdication of Nicholas II and Grand Duke Michael seemed like a mere secondary formality. From Bublikov's telegram, everyone already knew that by February 28, power was effectively in the hands of the Duma. But was this truly the case?

Of course not. Bublikov had adjusted reality to fit the narrative. In doing so, he rendered an enormous—though still unrecognized—service to the Russian Revolution, while simultaneously distorting its natural course by surrounding the Duma with an undeserved aura of legitimacy.

— Lomonosov, Y. V. Memoirs of the February Revolution of 1917.

Bublikov was also one of the four Duma members who guarded Nicholas II during his trip from Mogilev to Tsarskoe Selo for the rest of the revolution, as head of the Ministry of the Ways of Communication, he controlled the route and itinerary of the tsar's journey, effectively sealing Nicholas's ability to react from this point onward.

Around the same time, at 08:25, General Khabalov sent a telegram to the Stavka:

"The number of those remaining loyal to their duty has decreased to 600 infantrymen and 500 cavalrymen, with 13 machine guns and 12 artillery pieces, each with only 80 shells in total. The situation is extremely difficult."

Between 09:00 and 10:00, responding to General Ivanov's inquiries, he reported that under his command, stationed at the Main Admiralty building, were four guard companies, five squadrons and sotnias, and two batteries. He added that all other troops had either joined the revolutionaries or declared neutrality by agreement with them. He further described the chaos in the city:

"Scattered soldiers and gangs roam the streets, shooting at passersby and disarming officers... All railway stations are under the control of the revolutionaries and are strictly guarded by them... All artillery depots are in the hands of the revolutionaries..."

Even the Cossack units that the government had come to use for crowd control showed signs that they supported the people. Although few actively joined the rioting, many officers were either shot or went into hiding; the ability of the garrison to hold back the protests was all but nullified. Symbols of the Tsarist regime were rapidly torn down around the city and governmental authority in the capital collapsed – not helped by the fact that Nicholas had earlier that day suspended a session in the Duma that was intended to discuss the issue further, leaving it with no legal authority to act. Attempts were made by high-ranking military leaders to persuade the Tsar to resign power to the Duma.

=== Fate of the attempts to suppress the uprising ===
Upon learning of the uprising in Petrograd, Nicholas II, stationed in Mogilev, became concerned for his family's safety in Tsarskoye Selo and sought to restore order. Petrograd Military Governor Khabalov reported a severe deterioration of the situation by February 27 (March 12), 1917. General Ivanov was appointed to lead Petrograd's military district, replacing Khabalov, effective immediately, and was granted extraordinary powers. He planned to arrive in Petrograd on March 1 (14). Between February 28 (March 13) and March 2 (15), reinforcements were prepared, with the Western Front organizing the deployment of the 34th Sevsk and 36th Oryol Infantry Regiments, the 2nd Pavlograd Hussar, and the 2nd Don Cossack Regiments, while the Northern Front allocated the 67th and 68th Infantry Regiments, the 15th Tatar Uhlan, and the 3rd Ural Cossack Regiments.

The first echelon of the St. George Guards Battalion and a company of His Imperial Majesty's Own Regiment departed from Mogilev at 10:15 AM on February 28 (March 13), 1917. General-Adjutant Ivanov himself left later, catching up with the echelon in Orsha. Throughout the day, General Alekseyev issued orders to the front commanders to allocate additional troops under Ivanov's command—one infantry and one cavalry battery from both the Northern and Western Fronts, as well as three of the "strongest" fortress artillery battalions from Vyborg and Kronstadt. The commander of the Southwestern Front was ordered to prepare for deployment to General Ivanov's command, as soon as railway conditions allowed, the Leib Guard Preobrazhensky Regiment and two Guard Rifle Regiments from the Special Army. Additionally, if circumstances required further reinforcement of armed forces in Petrograd, one of the Guard Cavalry Divisions was to be sent.

On the night of February 28 to March 1, Alekseyev sent General-Adjutant Ivanov a telegram, a copy of which was later forwarded to front commanders to inform them of the situation in the capital. According to historian G. M. Katkov,

"By the evening of February 28, Alekseyev ceased to be merely a submissive executor of the tsar's orders and instead assumed the role of mediator between the monarch and his rebellious parliament. It was only due to Rodzianko, who created a false impression that Petrograd was fully under his control, that Alekseyev underwent such a shift."

Whereas previous reports from Petrograd, sent by Alekseyev to the front commanders, had accurately reflected the chaos and anarchy in the capital, this particular telegram painted a completely different picture. He stated that, based on private sources, the unrest in Petrograd had subsided, that troops had fully aligned with the Provisional Government, and that order was being restored. Alekseyev further wrote:

"The Provisional Government, under the chairmanship of Rodzianko, has summoned the commanders of military units to receive orders for maintaining order. A proclamation to the population, issued by the Provisional Government, affirms the stability of the monarchical foundation of Russia and the necessity of establishing a new basis for selecting and appointing a government... In Petrograd, they eagerly await His Majesty's arrival to present him with these matters and the people's request to accept their wishes."

Alekseyev continued:

"If this information is correct, then the approach to action must change. Negotiations will lead to pacification, avoiding a disgraceful civil conflict, which would only benefit our enemy."

Alekseyev urged Ivanov to relay the contents of the telegram to the emperor, as Alekseyev himself had no direct communication with Nicholas II. He also expressed his belief that "the situation can be resolved peacefully, leading to a favorable outcome that will strengthen Russia.

This telegram clearly reflected the image of events that Rodzianko sought to create in the mind of the chief of staff of the Supreme Commander. Katkov argued that the true purpose of the telegram was to prevent Ivanov from taking decisive military action to crush the uprising. The message conveyed that the new authority in Petrograd was acting in good faith and would contribute to the war effort with renewed energy. Thus, Alekseyev's telegram effectively paved the way for the recognition of the new government by the military command.

Alekseyev, it seems, was convinced that Rodzianko had Petrograd under control, had contained the revolutionary surge, and that the best course of action was to strengthen Rodzianko's position. Meanwhile, Katkov suggests that Rodzianko himself was motivated by both ambition and fear—he was eager to halt General Ivanov's expeditionary forces, believing them to be much larger and more powerful than they actually were.

General Ivanov reached Tsarskoye Selo with significant delay. At 6:00 PM on March 1, he and his detachment arrived at Vyritsa station. There, he issued a proclamation:

"By the highest order [The Emperor's] of February 28 of this year, I have been appointed Commander-in-Chief of the Petrograd Military District. Having arrived within the district today, I assume full command of its forces. I hereby declare this to all military, civilian, and ecclesiastical authorities, institutions, establishments, and the entire population within the district. — General-Adjutant Ivanov."

Arriving at Tsarskoye Selo at 9:00 PM, Ivanov met with the garrison command, who informed him that the Tarutino Regiment, which had been assigned to him by the Northern Front, had already arrived at Alexandrovskaya Station of the Warsaw Railway. However, the attempt to assemble a strong military force near Tsarskoye Selo ultimately failed. The allocated troops were scattered across Dvina, Polotsk, and Luga. Additionally, the Borodino Infantry Regiment, which had been sent from the Northern Front to Petrograd, was disarmed by the local revolutionary committee in Luga and sent back to Pskov. With only a small detachment, Ivanov was unable to take any decisive action without reinforcements from the front. Upon hearing of Ivanov's movements, Colonel Domanevsky, a representative of the General Staff, traveled to meet him on the evening of March 1. The clear goal of this mission was to dissuade Ivanov from any military intervention. Domanevsky informed Ivanov that

"Armed conflict with the revolutionaries will only worsen the situation and that restoring order would be easier through negotiations with the Provisional Government."

Later that night, Ivanov went to the imperial palace, where Empress Alexandra received him. There, he was shown Alekseyev's telegram, which suggested changing tactics due to the alleged restoration of order in Petrograd. Though the telegram seemed somewhat vague, Ivanov decided not to march troops into Petrograd until the situation became fully clear.

By March 2 (March 15), reports indicated that revolutionary forces were approaching his position, and Ivanov, fearing a clash between his detachment and the Tsarskoye Selo garrison, ordered his forces back to Vyritsa.

That night, Nicholas II sent a telegram to Ivanov at 12:20 AM, after his negotiations with General Ruzsky (who had been in contact with Rodzianko):

"Tsarskoye Selo. I hope you have arrived safely. I request that no measures be taken until my arrival and my further instructions. Nicholas. March 2, 1917, 12:20 AM."

On March 2, Ivanov attempted to proceed toward Alexandrovskaya Station, where the Tarutino Regiment was located. However, his train was diverted to Sushchino station, where he was blocked and handed a telegram from A. A. Bublikov, Commissar of the Provisional Committee of the State Duma. It warned him:

"On behalf of the Provisional Committee of the State Duma, I caution you that you bear great responsibility for your actions. I advise you not to move from Vyritsa, as, according to my sources, your regiment will be fired upon by artillery from revolutionary forces."

Seeing no alternative, Ivanov was forced to comply. Shortly thereafter, he received Nicholas II's official order to halt all troop movements, marking the final collapse of any effort to suppress the revolution.

=== Tsar's return and abdication ===
The response of the Duma, urged on by the Progressive Bloc, was to establish a Provisional Committee to restore law and order; the Provisional Committee declared itself the governing body of the Russian Empire. Chief among them was the desire to bring the war to a successful conclusion in conjunction with the Allies, and the very cause of their opposition was the ever-deepening conviction that this was unattainable under the present government and under the present regime. Meanwhile, the socialist parties re-established the Petrograd Soviet, first created during the 1905 revolution, to represent workers and soldiers. The remaining loyal units switched allegiance the next day.

On 28 February, Rodzianko invited the Grand Duke Paul Alexandrovich and Grand Duke Kirill Vladimirovich to put their signatures to the drafting of the Manifesto, in which Emperor Nicholas II was recommended to introduce the constitutional system in Russia. Rodzianko said that the Emperor will be asked to sign this Manifesto on 1 March at the Tsarskoye Selo railway station immediately after his return. Late in the evening the text "Grand Manifesto" was signed by the Grand Dukes Paul Alexandrovich, Kirill Vladimirovich and Dmitry Konstantinovich. But the Empress refused to sign the draft. "I'm not a ruler – said the Empress – and have no rights to take the initiative in the absence of the Emperor. Moreover, this paper may not be only illegal, but useless."

On 28 February O.S, at five in the morning, the Tsar had left Mogilev, (and also directed Nikolai Ivanov to go to Tsarskoye Selo) but was unable to reach Petrograd as revolutionaries controlled railway stations around the capital. Around midnight the train was stopped at Malaya Vishera, turned, and in the evening of 1 March O.S (14 March N.S) Nicholas arrived in Pskov. In the meantime, the units guarding the Alexander Palace in Tsarskoe Selo either "declared their neutrality" or left for Petrograd and thus abandoned the Imperial Family. On 28 February Nikolay Maklakov was arrested having tried to prevent a revolution together with Alexander Protopopov (on 8 February).

The Army Chief Nikolai Ruzsky, and the Duma deputies Vasily Shulgin and Alexander Guchkov who had come to advise the Tsar, suggested that he abdicate the throne. He did so on behalf of himself and his son, Tsarevich Alexei. At 3 o'clock in the afternoon of Thursday, 2 March O.S (15 March N.S), Nicholas nominated his brother, the Grand Duke Michael Alexandrovich, to succeed him. The next day the Grand Duke realised that he would have little support as ruler, so he declined the crown, stating that he would take it only if that was the consensus of democratic action by the Russian Constituent Assembly, which shall define the form of government for Russia. The 300-year-old Romanov dynasty ended with the Grand Duke's decision on 3 March O.S (16 March N.S). On 8 March O.S (22 March N.S) the former Tsar, addressed with contempt by the sentries as "Nicholas Romanov", was reunited with his family at the Alexander Palace at Tsarskoye Selo. He and his family and loyal retainers were placed under protective custody by the Provisional Government in the palace.

== Establishment of dual power ==
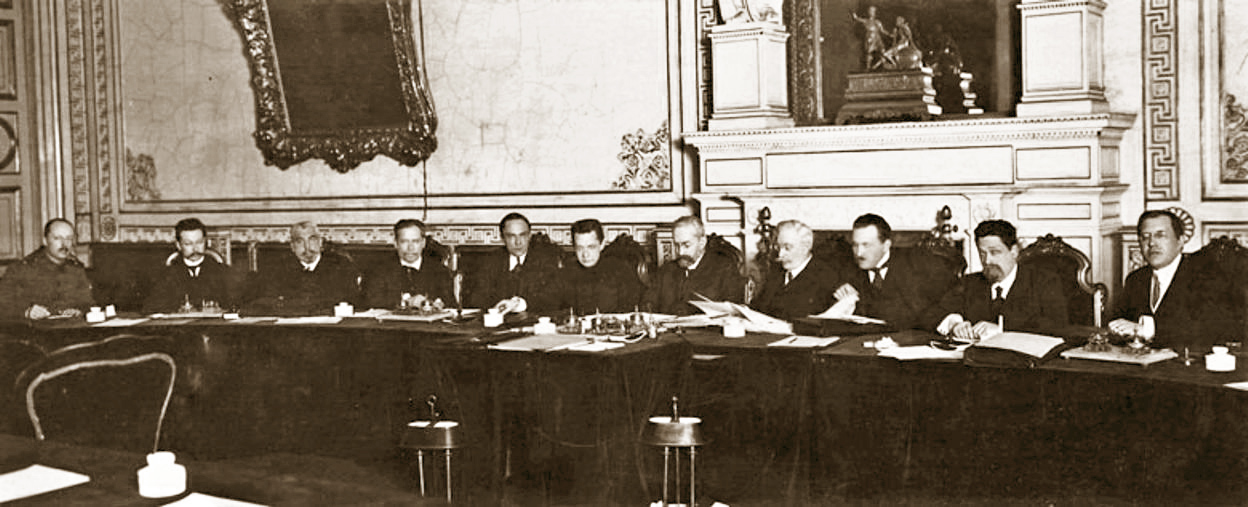
The provisional government early March 1917

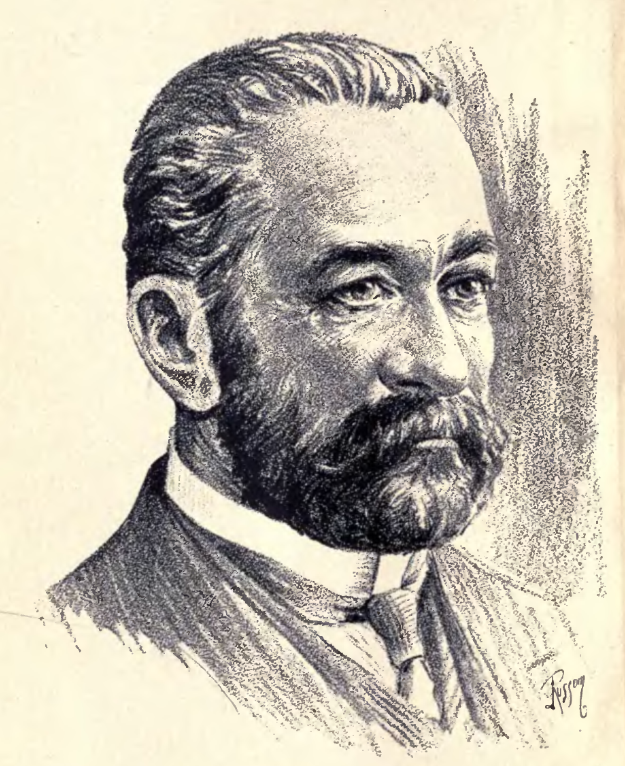
Prince Georgy Lvov, first head of the Provisional Government

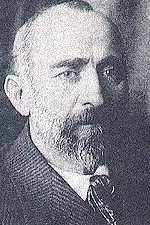
Nikolay Chkheidze, first chairman of the executive committee of the Petrograd Soviet

The February Revolution immediately caused widespread excitement in Petrograd. On 3 March O.S (16 March N.S), a provisional government was announced by the Provisional Committee of the State Duma. The Provisional Government published its manifesto declaring itself the governing body of the Russian Empire that same day. The manifesto proposed a plan of civic and political rights and the installation of a democratically elected Russian Constituent Assembly, but did not touch on many of the topics that were driving forces in the revolution such as participation in World War I and land. At the same time, the Petrograd Soviet (or workers' council) began organizing and was officially formed on 27 February. The Petrograd Soviet and the Provisional Government shared dual power over Russia. The term dual power came about as the driving forces in the fall of the monarchy, opposition to the human and widespread political movement, became politically institutionalized.

While the Soviet represented the proletariat, the provisional government represented the bourgeoisie. The Soviet had stronger practical power because it controlled the workers and the soldiers, but it did not want to become involved in administration and bureaucracy; the Provisional Government lacked support from the population. Since the Provisional Government did not have the support of the majority and, in an effort to keep their claim to democratic mandate, they welcomed socialist parties to join in order to gain more support and Dvoyevlastiye (dual power) was established. However, the Soviet asserted de facto supremacy as early as 1 March O.S (14 March N.S) (before the creation of the Provisional Government), by issuing Order No. 1:

The orders of the Military Commission of the State Duma [part of the organisation which became the Provisional Government] shall be executed only in such cases as do not conflict with the orders and resolution of the Soviet of Workers' and Soldiers' Deputies.

— Point 4 of Order No. 1, 1 March 1917.

Order No. 1 ensured that the Dual Authority developed on the Soviet's conditions. The Provisional Government was not a publicly elected body (having been self-proclaimed by committee members of the old Duma) and it lacked the political legitimacy to question this arrangement and instead arranged for elections to be held later. The Provisional Government had the formal authority in Russia but the Soviet Executive Committee and the soviets had the support of the majority of the population. The Soviet held the real power to effect change. The Provisional Government represented an alliance between liberals and socialists who wanted political reform.

The initial soviet executive chairmen were Menshevik Nikolay Chkheidze, Matvey Skobelev and Alexander Kerensky. The chairmen believed that the February Revolution was a "Bourgeois revolution" about bringing capitalist development to Russia instead of socialism. The center-left was well represented, and the government was initially chaired by a liberal aristocrat, Prince Georgy Yevgenyevich Lvov, a man with no connections to any official party. The Provisional government included 9 Duma deputies and 6 from the Kadet party in ministerial positional, representing professional and business interests, the bourgeoisie. As the left moved further left in Russia over the course of 1917, the Kadets became the main conservative party. Despite this, the provisional government strove to implement further left-leaning policies with the repeal of the death penalty, amnesty for political prisoners, and freedom of the press.

Dual Power was not prevalent outside of the capital and political systems varied from province to province. One example of a system gathered the educated public, workers, and soldiers to facilitate order and food systems, democratic elections, and the removal of tsarist officials. In a short amount of time, 3,000 deputies were elected to the Petrograd Soviet. The Soviet quickly became the representative body responsible for fighting for workers and soldiers hopes for "bread, peace, and land". In the spring of 1917, 700 soviets were established across Russia, equalling about a third of the population, representing the proletariat and their interests. The soviets spent their time pushing for a constituent assembly rather than swaying the public to believe they were a more morally sound means of governing.

== Long-term effects ==
After the abdication of the throne by the Tsar, the Provisional Government declared itself the new form of authority. The Provisional Government shared Kadet views. The Kadets were now seen as a conservative, "state-minded" party. At the same time that the Provisional Government was put into place, the Soviet Executive Committee also formed. The soviets were made up of workers and soldiers directly, being a democratic institution, allowing for cooperative decision making, while the Provisional Government was formed from the Duma delegates. The soviets, being formed democratically, ended up with a moderate-left majority, while the government was mostly made of the liberals and did not properly fulfill the demands of most of the country for peace and bread. When these two powers existed at the same time, "dual power" was created. The Provisional Government was granted formal authority, but the Soviet Executive Committee had the support of the people resulting in political unrest until the Bolshevik takeover in October.

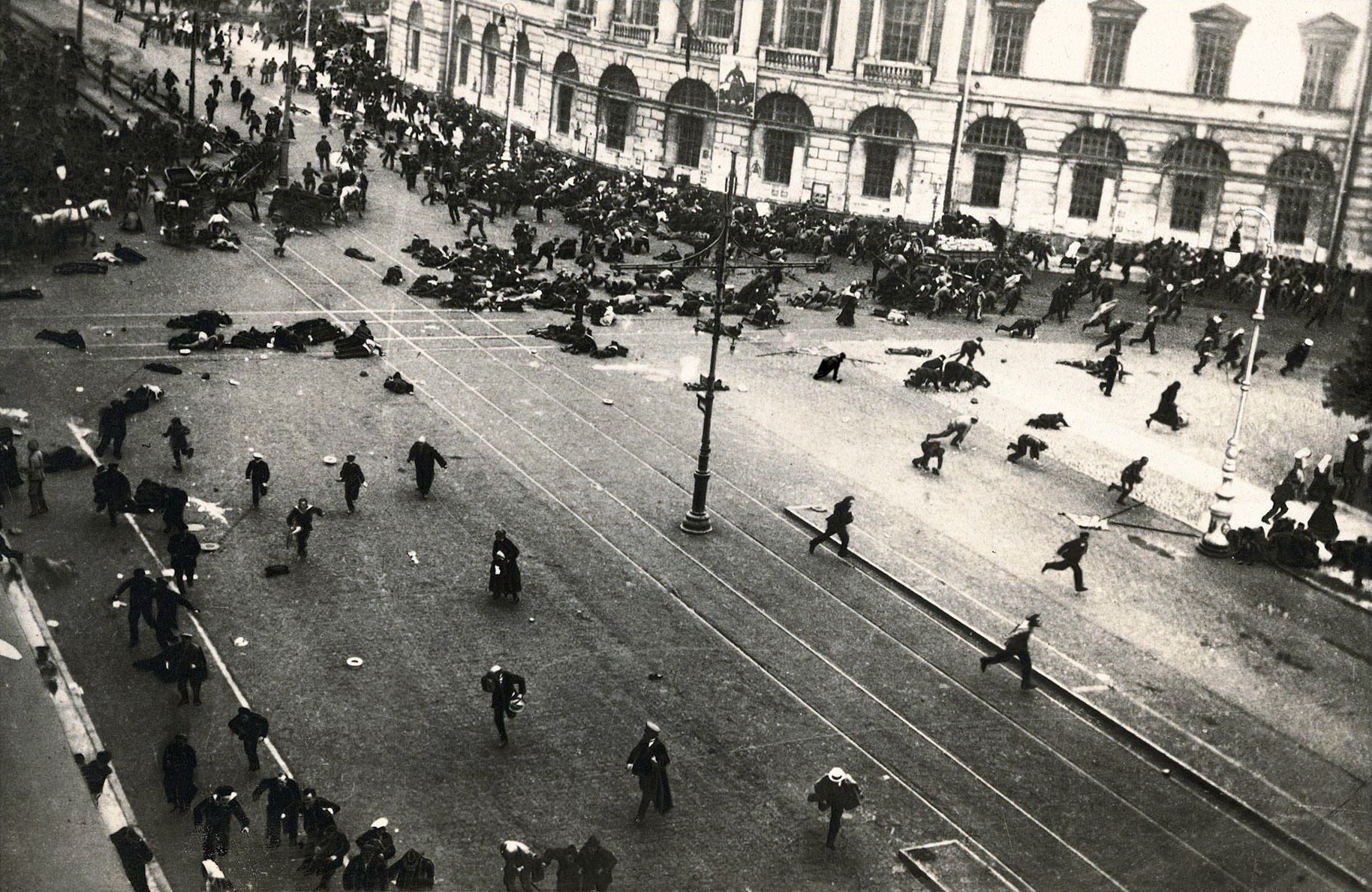
A scene from the July Days. The army had just opened fire on street protesters.

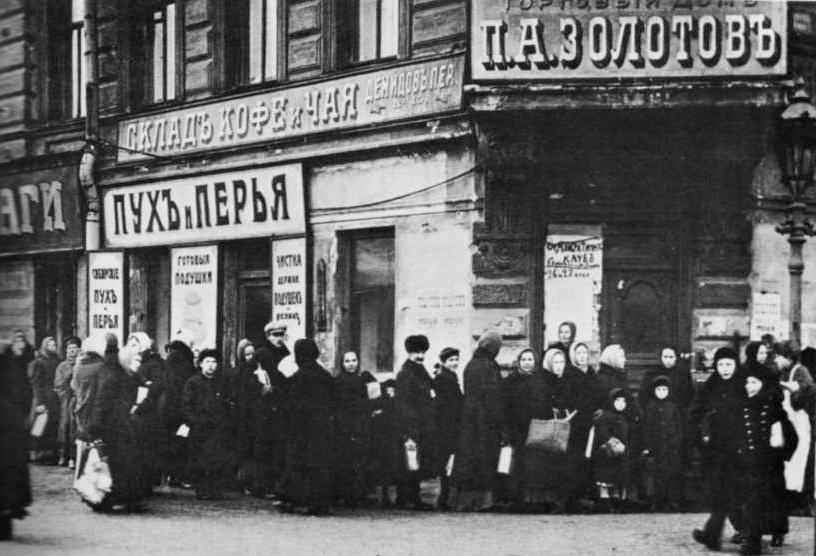
The queue at the grocery store in Petrograd. 1917

During the April Crisis (1917) Ivan Ilyin agreed with the Kadet Minister of Foreign Affairs Pavel Milyukov who staunchly opposed Petrograd Soviet demands for peace at any cost. Vladimir Lenin, exiled in neutral Switzerland, arrived in Petrograd from Zürich on 3 April O.S (16 April N.S). He immediately began to undermine the provisional government, issuing his April Theses the next month. These theses were in favor of "Revolutionary defeatism", which argues that the real enemy is those who send the proletariat into war, as opposed to the "imperialist war" (whose "link to Capital" must be demonstrated to the masses) and the "social-chauvinists" (such as Georgi Plekhanov, the grandfather of Russian socialism), who supported the war. The theses were read by Lenin to a meeting of only Bolsheviks and again to a meeting of Bolsheviks and Mensheviks, both being extreme leftist parties, and was also published. He believed that the most effective way to overthrow the government was to be a minority party and to give no support to the Provisional Government. Lenin also tried to take control of the Bolshevik movement and attempted to win proletariat support by the use of slogans such as "Peace, bread and land", "End the war without annexations or indemnities", "All power to the Soviets" and "All land to those who work it".

Initially, Lenin and his ideas did not have widespread support, even among Bolsheviks. In what became known as the July Days, approximately half a million soldiers, sailors, and workers, some of them armed, came out onto the streets of Petrograd in protest. The protesters seized automobiles, fought with people of authority, and often fired their guns into the air. The crowd was so uncontrollable that the Soviet leadership sent the Socialist Revolutionary Victor Chernov, a widely liked politician, to the streets to calm the crowd. The demonstrators, lacking leadership, disbanded and the government survived. Leaders of the Soviet placed the blame of the July Days on the Bolsheviks, as did the Provisional Government who issued arrest warrants for prominent Bolsheviks. Historians debated from early on whether this was a planned Bolshevik attempt to seize power or a strategy to plan a future coup. Lenin fled to Finland and other members of the Bolshevik party were arrested. Lvov was replaced by the Socialist Revolutionary minister Alexander Kerensky as head of the Provisional Government.

Kerensky declared freedom of speech, ended capital punishment, released thousands of political prisoners, and tried to maintain Russian involvement in World War I. He faced many challenges related to the war: there were still very heavy military losses on the front; dissatisfied soldiers deserted in larger numbers than before; other political groups did their utmost to undermine him; there was a strong movement in favor of withdrawing Russia from the war, which was seen to be draining the country, and many who had initially supported it now wanted out; and there was a great shortage of food and supplies, which was very difficult to remedy in wartime conditions. All of these were highlighted by the soldiers, urban workers, and peasants who claimed that little had been gained by the February Revolution. Kerensky was expected to deliver on his promises of jobs, land, and food, and failed to do so. In August 1917 Russian socialists assembled for a conference on defense, which resulted in a split between the Bolsheviks, who rejected the continuation of the war, and moderate socialists.

The Kornilov Affair arose when Commander-in-Chief of the Army, General Lavr Kornilov, directed an army under Aleksandr Krymov to march toward Petrograd with Kerensky's agreement. Although the details remain sketchy, Kerensky appeared to become frightened by the possibility of a coup, and the order was countermanded. (Historian Richard Pipes is adamant that the episode was engineered by Kerensky). On 27 August O.S (9 September N.S), feeling betrayed by the Kerensky government, who had previously agreed with his views on how to restore order to Russia, Kornilov pushed on towards Petrograd. With few troops to spare on the front, Kerensky turned to the Petrograd Soviet for help. Bolsheviks, Mensheviks and Socialist Revolutionaries confronted the army and convinced them to stand down. Right-wingers felt betrayed, and the left-wingers were resurgent. On 1 September O.S. (14 September N.S.) Kerensky formally abolished the monarchy and proclaimed the creation of the Russian Republic. On 24 October, Kerensky accused the Bolsheviks of treason. After the Bolshevik walkout, some of the remaining delegates continued to stress that ending the war as soon as possible was beneficial to the nation.

Pressure from the Allies to continue the war against Germany put the government under increasing strain. The conflict between the "diarchy" became obvious, and ultimately the regime and the dual power formed between the Petrograd Soviet and the Provisional Government, instigated by the February Revolution, was overthrown by the Bolsheviks in the October Revolution.

== Historiography ==
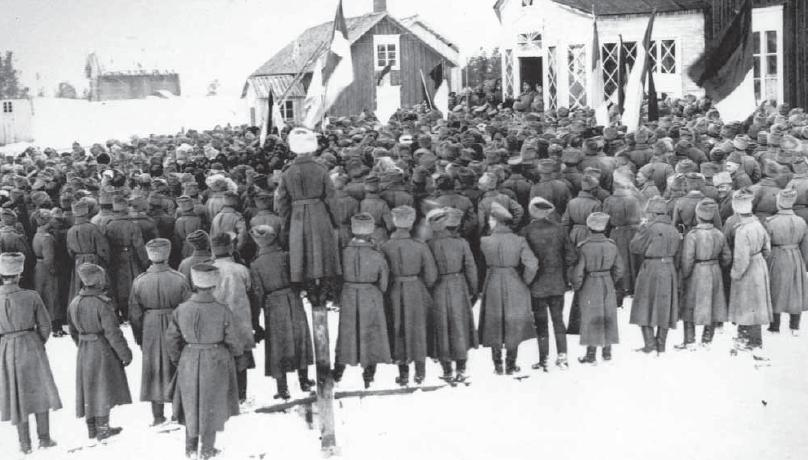
A revolutionary meeting of Russian soldiers in March 1917 in Dalkarby of Jomala, Åland

When discussing the historiography of the February Revolution there are three historical interpretations which are relevant: Communist, Liberal, and Revisionist. These three different approaches exist separately from one another because of their respective beliefs of what ultimately caused the collapse of a Tsarist government in February.

- Communist historians present a story in which the masses that brought about revolution in February were organized groups of 'modernizing' peasants who were bringing about an era of both industrialization and freedom. Communist historian Boris Sokolov has been outspoken about the belief that the revolution in February was a coming together of the people and was more positive than the October revolution. Communist historians consistently place little emphasis on the role of World War I (WWI) in leading to the February Revolution.
- In contrast, Liberal perspectives of the February Revolution almost always acknowledge WWI as a catalyst to revolution. On the whole, though, Liberal historians credit the Bolsheviks with the ability to capitalize on the worry and dread instilled in Russian citizens because of WWI. The overall message and goal of the February Revolution, according to the Liberal perspective, was ultimately democracy; the proper climate and attitude had been created by WWI and other political factors which turned public opinion against the Tsar.
- Revisionist historians present a timeline where the revolution in February was far less inevitable than the liberals and communists would make it seem. Revisionists track the mounting pressure on the Tsarist regime back further than the other two groups to unsatisfied peasants in the countryside upset over matters of land-ownership. This tension continued to build into 1917 when dissatisfaction became a full-blown institutional crisis incorporating the concerns of many groups. Revisionist historian Richard Pipes has been outspoken about his anti-communist approach to the Russian Revolution.

"Studying Russian history from the West European perspective, one also becomes conscious of the effect that the absence of feudalism had on Russia. Feudalism had created in the West networks of economic and political institutions that served the central state... once [the central state] replaced the feudal system, as a source of social support and relative stability. Russia knew no feudalism in the traditional sense of the word, since, after the emergence of the Muscovite monarchy in the fifteenth and sixteenth centuries, all landowners were tenants-in-chief of the Crown, and subinfeudation was unknown. As a result, all power was concentrated in the Crown." — (Pipes, Richard. A Concise History of the Russian Revolution. New York: Vintage, 1996.)

Out of these three approaches, all of them have received modern criticism. The February Revolution is seen by many present-day scholars as an event which gets "mythologized".

== See also ==
- Bibliography of the Russian Revolution and Civil War
- Outline of the Russian Revolution and Civil War
- Index of articles related to the Russian Revolution and Civil War* 1905 Russian Revolution
- Nicholas and Alexandra, a biographical film of the Emperor and his family
- Women in the Russian Revolution
