= Valentin Khaustov =

Russian politician (1884-?)

Valentin Khaustov Russian: Валентин Хаустов
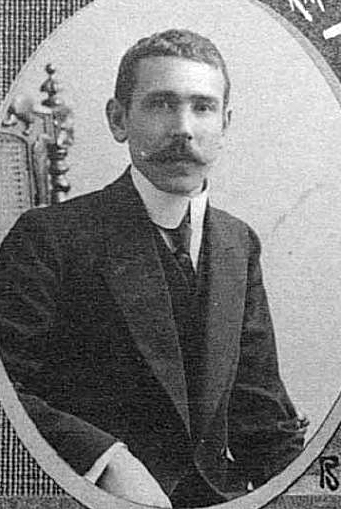
- photo of 1913

Deputy of the Fourth Imperial Duma
- In office 20 November 1912 – 6 October 1917
- Monarch: Nicholas II / monarchy abolished
- Succeeded by: post abolished

Personal details
- Born: Valentin Ivanovich Khaustov; 1884 Ryazan Governorate, Russian Empire
- Died: after 1922
- Party: Mensheviks

Valentin Ivanovich Khaustov (Russian: Валенти́н Ива́нович Ха́устов; 1884, Ryazan Governorate — after 1922) was a Russian turner, a menshevik and a deputy of the Fourth Imperial Duma from the Ufa Governorate between 1912 and 1917. He was also a member of the All-Russian Central Executive Committee (VTsIK). In 1917 he became a member of the Provisional Committee of the State Duma and the executive committee of the Petrograd Soviet - he was appointed a commissar for postal and telegraph employees. In 1918, after the beginning of the Russian Civil War, he supported the Committee of Members of the Constituent Assembly.

== Literature ==
- Николаев А. Б. Хаустов Валентин Иванович (in Russian) // Государственная дума Российской империи: 1906—1917 / Б. Ю. Иванов, А. А. Комзолова, И. С. Ряховская. — Москва: РОССПЭН, 2008. — P. 657. — 735 p. — ISBN 978-5-8243-1031-3.
- Хаустов (in Russian) // Члены Государственной думы (портреты и биографии): Четвертый созыв, 1912—1917 г. / сост. М. М. Боиович. — Москва: Тип. Т-ва И. Д. Сытина, 1913. — P. 362. — LXIV, 454, [2] p.
- Мордвинцев Г. В. Уфимский рабочий депутат IV Государственной думы социал-демократ В. И. Хаустов и его протест против Первой мировой войны // Вестник ВЭГУ. — Уфа, 2014. — 7—8 (No. 4 (72)). — P. 119–131. — ISSN 1998-0078. (in Russian)
