= Provisional Committee of the State Duma =

Special body in the Provisional Government of Russia

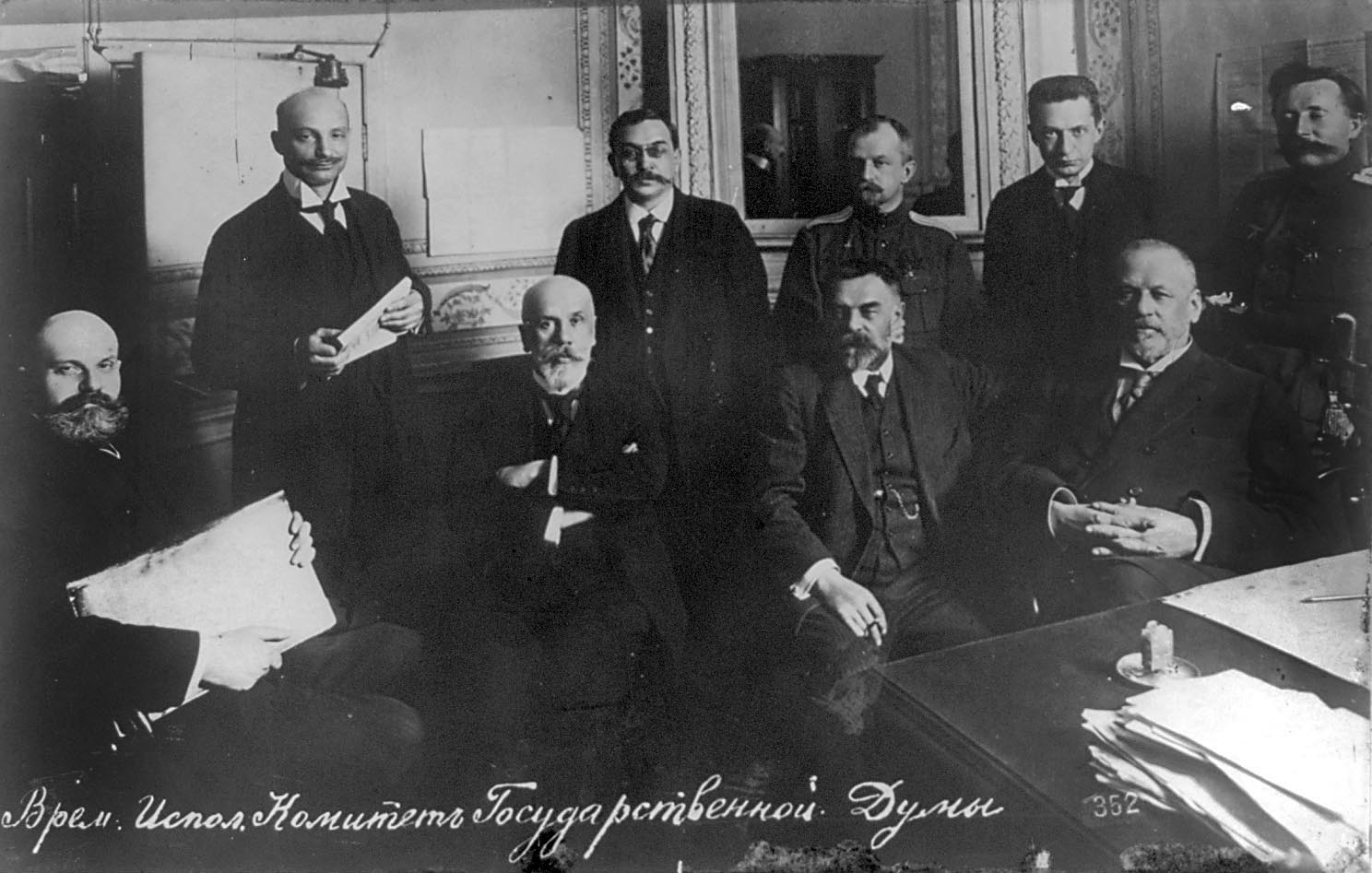
Nine members of the Provisional Committee of the State Duma in March 1917. From left to right: Seated: V. N. Lvov, V. A. Rzhevsky, S. I. Shidlovsky, and M. V. Rodzianko (Chairman); Standing: V. V. Shulgin, B. A. Engelhardt, A. F. Kerensky, and M. A. Karaulov.

The Provisional Committee of the State Duma (Russian: Временный Комитет Государственной Думы) was a special government body established on March 12, 1917 (27 February O.S.) by the Fourth State Duma deputies at the outbreak of the February Revolution in the same year. It was formed under the jurisdiction of the Russian Provisional Government, established immediately after the abdication of Nicholas II.

| Name | Party | Notes |
|---|---|---|
| Mikhail Rodzianko | Octobrist | Committee chairman |
| Vasily Shulgin | Progressive Russian Nationalists | Faction leader |
| Vladimir Lvov | Center | Chairman of Duma's faction |
| Ivan Dmitryukov | Octobrist | (left deviation) |
| Sergei Shidlovskiy | Octobrist | Chairman of Progressive Bloc, leader of left Octobrists |
| Mikhail Karaulov | Independent | Commandant of Taurida Palace |
| Alexander Kerensky | Trudovik | Executive Committee of Petrograd Soviet |
| Aleksandr Konovalov | Progressist | |
| Vladimir Rzhevsky | Progressist | |
| A.A. Bublikov? | Progressist Party | |
| Vasily Maklakov | Kadet | |
| Pavel Milyukov | Kadet | |
| Nikolai Nekrasov | Kadet | |
| Nikolay Chkheidze | Menshevik | Executive Committee of Petrograd Soviet |
| Vasily Anisimoff? | Menshevik | Executive Committee of Petrograd Soviet |
| Boris Engelgardt | Independent | Commandant of Petrograd Garrison |

The committee declared itself the governing body of Russian Empire, but competed for power with the Petrograd Soviet, which was created on the same day. The Government of Golitzine as the Council of Ministers of Russian Empire retreated to the Admiralty building. The committee of the State Duma appointed 24 commissars to head various state ministries replacing the Imperial Government. According to Milyukov Chkheidze never participated in the work of the committee.

On March 15 (March 2 O.S.) the committee and the Petrograd Soviet agreed to create the Provisional Government. Many members of the committee went on to serve in the Provisional Government, while the committee continued to play an insignificant role until the Fourth Duma was dissolved on September 19 (September 6 O.S.).
