= Mikhail Rodzianko =

Ukrainian-Russian statesman (1859–1924)

- Михаил Родзянко
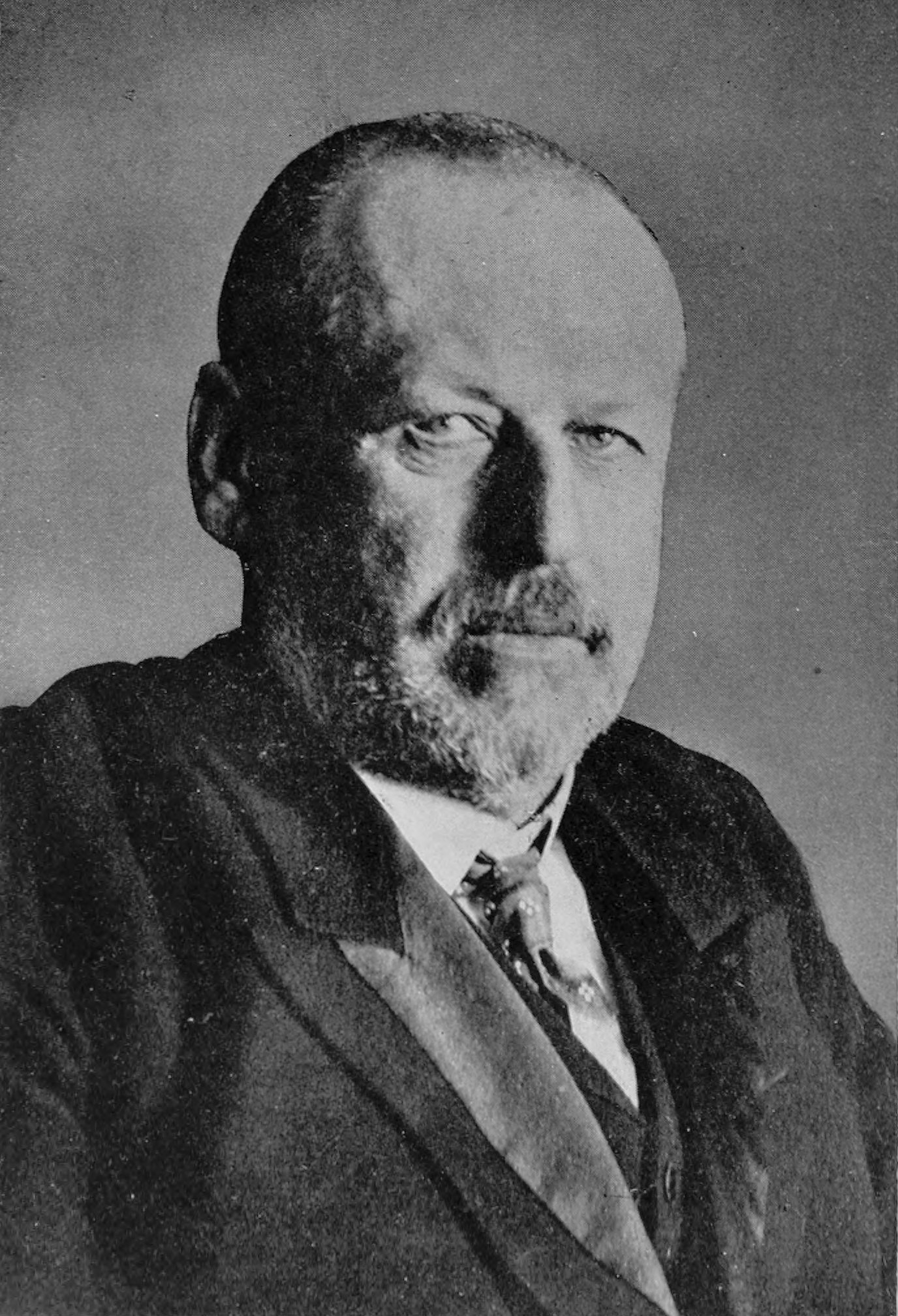
- Rodzianko in 1917

5th Chairman of the State Duma
- In office 22 March 1911 – 6 October 1917
- Monarch: Nicholas II
- Prime Minister: Pyotr Stolypin; Vladimir Kokovtsov; Ivan Goremykin; Boris Stürmer; Alexander Trepov; Nikolai Golitsyn
- Preceded by: Alexander Guchkov
- Succeeded by: Ivan Rybkin (1994)

Personal details
- Born: Mikhail Vladimirovich Rodzianko; 21 February 1859 Popasnoye, Novomoskovsk uezd, Yekaterinoslav Governorate, Russian Empire (Popasne, Novomoskovsk Raion, Ukraine)
- Died: 24 January 1924 (aged 64) Beodra, Kingdom of Serbs, Croats and Slovenes
- Party: Union of October 17
- Spouse: Anna Nikolaevna Golitsyna
- Education: Page corps
- Occupation: Politician, Chairman of the State Duma

Military service
- Allegiance: Russian Empire
- Branch/service: (Russian Empire) Imperial Guards
- Years of service: 1877–1885
- Rank: Lieutenant

Mikhail Vladimirovich Rodzianko (Russian: Михаи́л Влади́мирович Родзя́нко; Ukrainian: Михайло Володимирович Родзянко; 21 February 1859 – 24 January 1924) was a Russian statesman of Ukrainian origin. Known for his colorful language and conservative politics, he was the State Councillor and chamberlain of the Imperial family, Chairman of the State Duma and one of the leaders of the February Revolution of 1917, during which he headed the Provisional Committee of the State Duma. He was a key figure in the events that led to the abdication of Nicholas II of Russia on 15 March 1917.

== Life ==
Rodzianko was born in the village of Popasnoye, Yekaterinoslav Govnernorate. He came from an old and rich noble family of Ukrainian origin and was educated at the Corps des Pages. From 1877 until 1882 he served in Her Majesty's Regiment of the Cavalry of the Guard. In 1884 Rodzianko married Anna Nikolaevna Galitzine (1859–1929); the couple had three children. In 1885 he retired and lived on his estate in the Novgorod Oblast. He was appointed as Marshall of the Gentry. Rodzianko served as Kammerherr in 1899. In 1900 he was elected in Yekaterinoslav Governorate. From 1903 until 1905 he was editor of a newspaper, called "Herald Katerynoslav zemstvos." In 1906 he was elected for the Zemstvo as Provincial Zemstvo Executive.

In 1905 Rodzianko had been one of the founders and leaders of the Octobrist party. He became a deputy in the Third Duma (1907), vice-president in 1909 and was elected Chairman on 22 March 1911 after the resignation of Aleksandr Guchkov, who was hated by the court as a "Young Turk." He then continued as the Chairman of the Fourth Duma from 15 November 1912 until its dissolution on 6 October 1917 (before the October Revolution).

=== Chairman of the Fourth Duma ===
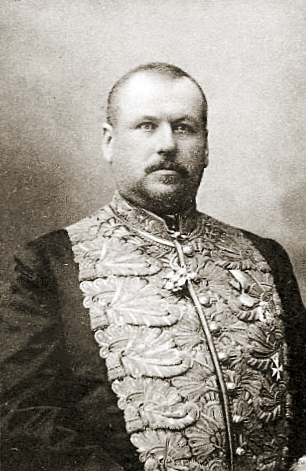
Mikhail Rodzianko, 1910

Rodzianko thought the meeting between Grigory Rasputin and Emperor Nicholas II "marked the beginning of the decay of the Russian society and the loss of prestige of the throne and of the tsar himself." He gathered information on Rasputin and handed it to the Emperor. Rodzianko, who asked Rasputin to leave the capital, and Theofan of Poltava held Rasputin to be a Khlyst. "The emperor took no account of the report which nevertheless proved undoubtedly that Rasputin was not the holy man he claimed to be."

On 21 February 1913, Rodzianko dismissed Rasputin from the Cathedral of Our Lady of Kazan in Saint Petersburg shortly before the celebration of the tercentenary of Romanov rule over Russia. He had established himself in front of the seats which Rodzianko, after considerable difficulty, had secured for the Duma. According to Orlando Figes, "the members were to be seated at the back, far behind the places reserved for the state councilors and senators. This, he complained to the master of ceremonies, was 'not following the dignity' of the parliament." Rasputin considered Rodzianko a personal enemy.

"Rodzianko told the Tsar in March 1913: 'A war will be joyfully welcomed and it will raise the government's prestige.'" In April 1915, Rodzianko visited the Russian troops occupying Austrian Galicia.

On 11 August 1915, the day the Emperor announced he would take the Supreme Command from Grand Duke Nicholas, according to M. Nelipa, Rodzianko suffered a heart attack. Somehow, Rodzianko participated in the creation of the Progressive Bloc.

For Rodzianko, Alexei Khvostov had broken his neck in combating the Rasputin clique and Prime Minister Boris Stürmer would become a dictator with full powers early in 1916.

In the summer of 1916, there was another crisis in the government: Rodzianko proposed Alexander Protopopov to the Emperor and Protopopov hinted at Rodzianko as Premier and Foreign Minister. But after Protopopov had become Minister of the Interior and had expressed admiration for the ruling family, the Duma attacked him fiercely and called at once for his dismissal. Rodzianko demanded that the Empress be internally exiled to the Crimea until the end of the war. The Empress demanded in response that Rodzianko's court rank be taken from him; she referred to him in her letters as a scoundrel.

Zinaida Yusupova, Alexandra's sister Elisabeth, Grand Duchess Victoria, and the Emperor's own mother tried to influence the Emperor or his stubborn wife to remove Rasputin, but without success. Rodzianko told Nicholas the truth, after being urged by the Emperor's mother and sisters. To him, the Empress Alexandra clearly should not have been allowed to interfere in state affairs until the end of the war; she treated her husband as if he were a little boy, quite incapable of taking care of himself.

On 7 January 1917, Rodzianko told the Tsar in regard to his government, "All the best men have been removed or have retired. There remain [only] those of ill repute."

=== February Revolution ===
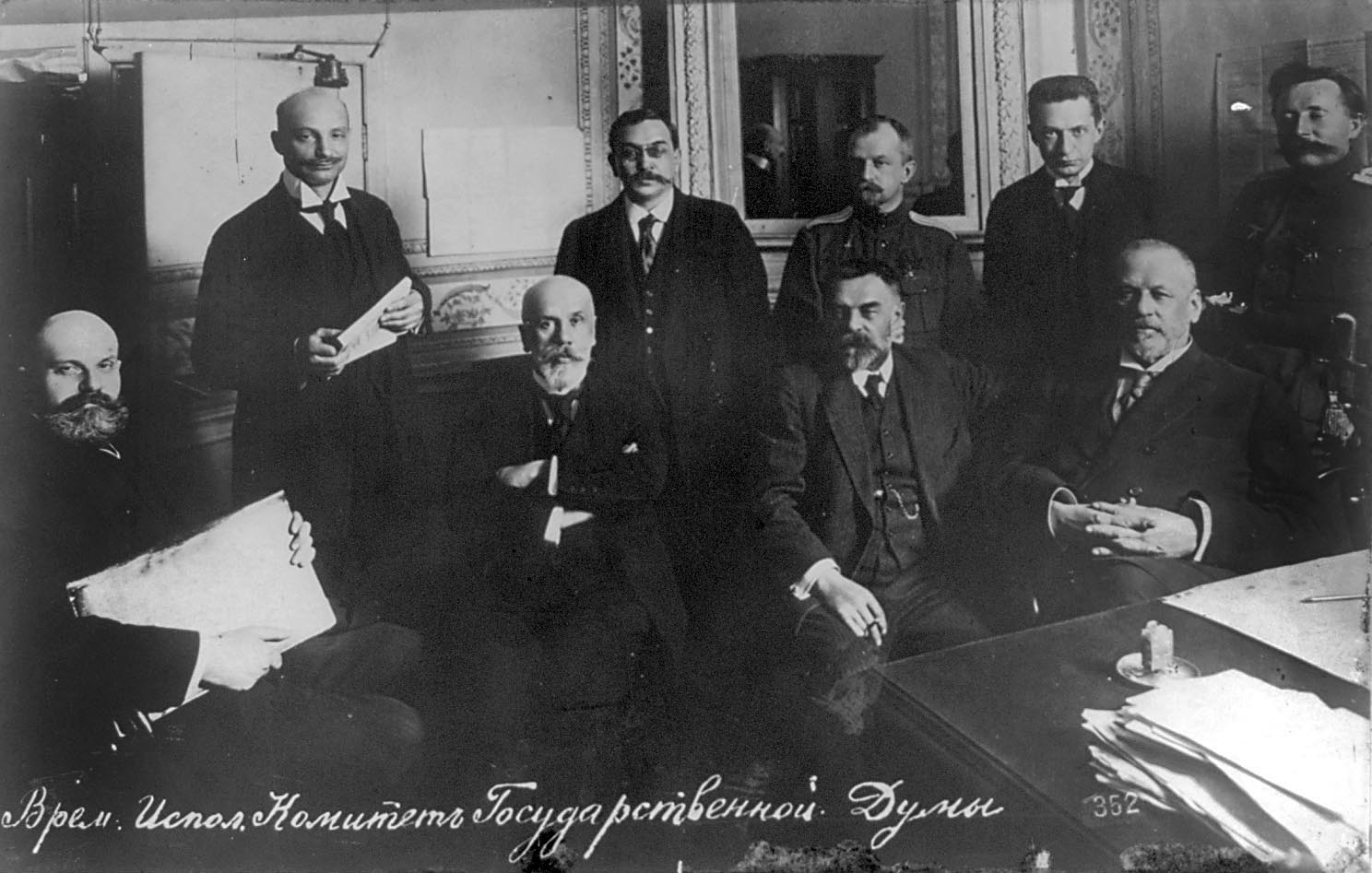
The Interim Committee of the State Duma in 1917

Mikhail Rodzianko was one of the key politicians during the Russian February Revolution. On 26 February, Rodzianko urged the Tsar to promulgate reforms in a telegram. "Serious situation in the capital, where anarchy reigns. General discontent was increasing. In the streets, uninterrupted firing, and one part of the troops is firing on the other. It is necessary to nominate without delay a person possessing the confidence of the people and who would form a new Government. To wait is impossible." Nicholas refused to reply, instead he ordered the dissolution of the Duma and a military crackdown and in a conversation with Count Vladimir Freedericksz referred to Rodzianko, not very respectfully, as "fat-bellied Rodzianko". On 27 February he retired as Captain of the Guards. On 28 February he presided over the Provisional Committee of the State Duma and advised the local governments to stay calm. On 1 March the power came entirely in the hands of the Petrograd Soviet. On that day Rodzianko assured general Mikhail Alekseyev that the Duma leaders, rather than the Soviet ones, would form the new government in Petrograd. Rodzianko discussed the situation with General Nikolai Ruzsky, who had the Imperial train stopped in Pskov. Nicholas II had no other choice than to follow Rodzianko's advice. On 2 March 1917, a Russian Provisional Government was formed, which included members of the Social Revolutionary Party. Rodzianko appointed General Lavr Kornilov as head over the troops in Petrograd. In the evening Rodzianko led abdication talks with the Tsar, to satisfy the crowds.

Early in the morning of 2 March (Old Style) or 15 March (New Style), the Tsar stepped down in favor of his son Alexei. As the tsesarevich suffered from an incurable disease, hemophilia B, his life expectations were short. Then Grand Duke Michael Alexandrovich of Russia came into the picture as the new heir to the throne, but was regarded as unacceptable. With Prince Lvov, Alexander Kerensky and Pavel Miliukov, Rodzianko visited Grand Duke Michael. The Grand Duke declined the crown after a long talk with Rodzianko.

Rodzianko remained Prime Minister just for a few days. He succeeded in publishing an order for the immediate return of the soldiers to their barracks and to subordinate to their officers. To them Rodzianko was unacceptable as prime minister and Prince Georgi Lvov, a member of the Constitutional Democratic Party, became his successor.

=== Later years ===
Together with Aleksandr Guchkov he founded a liberal republican party in the summer of 1917. After the October Revolution or shortly after the seizure of power by Lenin, he left Petrograd and moved to Rostov-on-Don and Crimea. Rodzianko supported Anton Denikin and Pyotr Wrangel but when it became clear the White Army had lost, he emigrated to Serbia in 1920. There he wrote his memoirs The Reign of Rasputin: an Empire's Collapse. According to Bernard Pares he died in great poverty. His remains were moved to the Belgrade New Cemetery in May 1924.

== Sources ==
- Figes, O. (1996) A People's Tragedy: the Russian Revolution, 1891–1924.
- Rodzianko, M.V. (1927) The Reign of Rasputin: an empire's collapse: Memoirs of M. V. Rodzianko. A.M. Philpot (London)

Media related to Mikhail Rodzianko at Wikimedia Commons

Preceded by Aleksandr Guchkov	Chairman of the State Duma; 22 March 1911 — 6 October 1917	Succeeded by Ivan Rybkin (1993)
