= Aleksandr Bublikov =

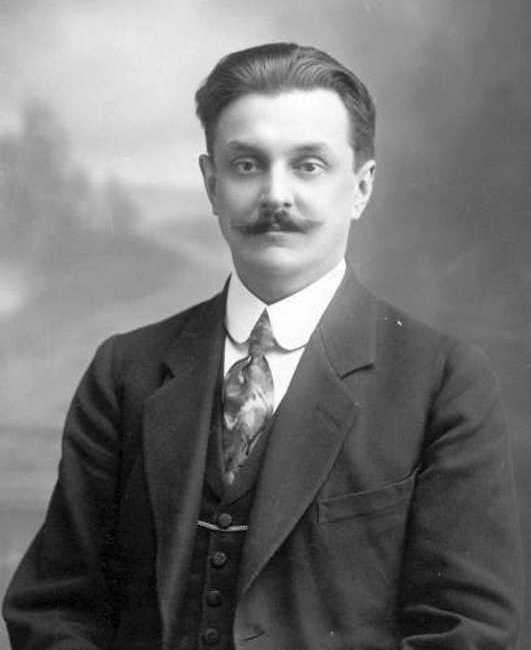

Aleksandr Aleksandrovich Bublikov (Russian: Алекса́ндр Алекса́ндрович Бу́бликов; March 16, 1875-January 29, 1941) was a Russian politician and engineer.

== Biography ==
Bublikov graduated from the Institute of Ways and Communications. Bublikov served as a Progressivist deputy to the Fourth Duma, representing Perm Province. During his time as a deputy, he introduced legislation in 1916 prohibiting the import of luxury goods into Russia for three years. Bublikov was the deputy chairman of the Central War Industry Committee from 1914 to 1917. Although politically conservative, Bublikov tried to convince industrialists that they should be willing to compromise with workers' demands to ensure their own continued economic prosperity.

On February 27, 1917, he was placed in charge of the Ministry of the Ways of Communication. He was appointed by Mikhail Rodzianko, despite Rodzianko's claim to Mikhail Alekseyev that he was a supporter of the tsar. This was an important government position in the Revolution, as it coordinated train movements and military transport. Bublikov used this role to send a general telegram announcing that the Duma now controlled the government. 'The old regime..." wrote Bublikov, "has proved powerless [and] the State Duma took the formation of a new government into its own hands." This was followed by a second telegram on the same day, prohibiting trains from traveling within 265 kilometers of Petrograd, ensuring that counter-revolutionary troops could not arrive by railway.

He used existing communication networks between railway stations to share information across Russia while newspapers were still censored. Bublikov was one of the four Duma members who guarded Nicholas II during his trip from Mogilev to Tsarskoe Selo in March 1917 and, as head of the Ministry of the Ways of Communication, he controlled the route and itinerary of the tsar's journey.

At the Moscow State Conference in August 1917, he shook hands with Irakli Tsereteli, "in a symbolic reconciliation between the 'bourgeoisie' and the 'revolution'. Trotsky criticized this gesture at reconciliation as a doomed effort at "saving with spectral measures a spectral regime".

Bublikov arrived in the United States on December 26, 1917, where he used his role in the Russian Revolution to argue that the Bolshevik government was unable to govern the country. He was a delegate to the first convention of the Federation of Russian Organizations in America in 1918.
