= Constitutional Democratic Party =

1905–1917 Russian centrist political party

Constitutional Democratic Party Конституционно-демократическая партия
- Abbreviation: K-D; Kadets
- President: Pavel Miliukov
- Founders: Pavel Miliukov; Andrei Shingarev; Pavel Dolgorukov; Vladimir Nabokov Sr.; and others
- Founded: 12 October 1905
- Banned: 11 December 1917
- Merger of: Union of Liberation; Union of Zemstvo Constitutionalists
- Headquarters: Saint Petersburg
- Newspaper: Rech
- Ideology: Liberalism (Russian) Social liberalism; 1905–1906 Radicalism Republicanism; After 1906 Constitutional monarchism Parliamentarism Pluralism Russian nationalism
- Political position: 1905–1906 Centre-left to left-wing; After 1906 Centre to centre-right
- Colours: Green
- Slogan: Skill and work for the good of the Motherland (Russian: Умение и труд на благо Родине)
- State Duma (1906): 178 / 497
- State Duma (Jan 1907): 124 / 518
- State Duma (Oct 1907): 54 / 441
- State Duma (1912): 59 / 432
- Constituent Assembly: 24 / 766

The Constitutional Democratic Party (Russian: Конституцио́нно-демократи́ческая па́ртия, romanized: Konstitutsionno-demokraticheskaya partiya, K-D), also called Constitutional Democrats and formally the Party of People's Freedom (Russian: Па́ртия Наро́дной Свобо́ды), was a political party in the Russian Empire that promoted Western constitutional monarchy—among other policies—and attracted a base ranging from moderate conservatives to mild socialists. Party members were called Kadets (or Cadets) from the abbreviation K-D of the party name. Konstantin Kavelin's and Boris Chicherin's writings formed the theoretical basis of the party's platform. Historian Pavel Miliukov was the party's leader throughout its existence.

The Kadets' base of support were primarily intellectuals and professionals; university professors and lawyers were particularly prominent within the party. Many Kadet party members were veterans of the zemstvo, local councils. The Constitutional Democratic Party formed from the merger of several liberal groupings, namely the Union of Liberation, the Union of Zemstvo Constitutionalists and the Union of Unions as well as the organization of bourgeois professionals and intellectuals, including teachers, lawyers, writers, physicians and engineers.

The Kadets' liberal economic program favored the workers' right to an eight-hour day and the right to take strike action. The Kadets "were unwaveringly committed to full citizenship for all of Russia's minorities" and supported Jewish emancipation. The party drew significant support from Jews (until 1916) and Volga Germans, and a significant number of each group were active party members. On the other hand, the Kadets adhered to Russian nationalism as they largely based their identity on the "Russian nation" or the "Russian people" as something opposed to the state bureaucracy; from 1905, they drifted towards statism, and their views on foreign politics were based on the view of international politics as a "national struggle", with the party generally advocating for Russian imperialism, describing Russians as a Staatsvolk and the Russian Empire as their nation-state. However, the Kadets differed from the hardline ethnocentric Russian nationalists, as they understood Russians rather as a political identity and defended the right of ethnic minorities and nations of Russia both to maintain cultural autonomy and to enter the Russian nation. Such views and Pan-Slavism, which they shared with the other moderate right-wing parties, drove them into a very hostile attitude towards Germany and Austria-Hungary during World War I, and by 1917, they were strongly nationalist and defensist; during the Russian Civil War, they became proponents of military dictatorship and territorial integrity of the Russian Empire, and were the strongest supporters of the Whites next to the nationalist parties.

== Radical origins (1905–1906) ==
The Constitutional Democratic Party was formed in Moscow on 12–18 October 1905 at the height of the Russian Revolution of 1905 when Tsar Nicholas II was forced to sign the October Manifesto granting basic civil liberties. The Kadets were to the immediate left of the Octobrists, another new formed party organized at the same time. Unlike the Octobrists, who were committed to constitutional monarchy from the start, the Kadets were at first ambiguous on the subject, demanding universal suffrage (including women's suffrage) and a Constituent Assembly that would determine the country's form of government. This radicalism was despite the fact 60% of Kadets were nobles. The Kadets were one of the parties invited by the reform-minded Prime Minister Sergei Witte to join his cabinet in October–November 1905, but the negotiations broke down over the Kadets' radical demands and Witte's refusal to drop notorious reactionaries like Petr Nikolayevich Durnovo from the cabinet.

With some socialist and revolutionary parties boycotting the election to the First Duma in February 1906, the Kadets received 37% of the urban vote and won over 30% of the seats in the Duma. They interpreted their electoral win as a mandate and allied with the left-leaning peasant Trudovik faction, forming a majority in the Duma. When their declaration of legislative intent was rejected by the government at the start of the parliamentary session in April, they adopted a radical oppositionist line, denouncing the government at every opportunity. On 9 July, the government announced that the Duma was dysfunctional and dissolved it. In response, 120 Kadet and 80 Trudovik and Social Democrat deputies went to in Vyborg, Finland (and thus beyond the reach of Russian police) and responded with the Vyborg Manifesto (or the "Vyborg Appeal"), written by Pavel Milyukov. In the manifesto, they called for passive resistance, non-payment of taxes and draft avoidance. The appeal failed to have an effect on the population at large and proved both ineffective and counterproductive, leading to a ban on its authors, including the entire Kadet leadership, from participation in future Dumas. This was further accentuated by the force of the tsar trying to control and deteriorate the power of the Duma.

It was not until later in 1906, with the revolution in retreat, that the Kadets abandoned revolutionary and republican aspirations and declared their support for a constitutional monarchy. The government remained suspicious of the Kadets until the fall of the monarchy in 1917. Finnish liberal politician and professor of jurisdiction and politology Leo Mechelin was expelled 1903–1904 when the Kadets were preparing to form a party. Mechelin cooperated with them and wrote them a liberal constitution for Russia to be enforced when they would get into power. At the time of Vyborg Manifesto, Mechelin was already the leader of the Finnish government, or "Mechelin's senate" (1905–1908), which implemented the universal right to vote and freedoms of expression, press, congregation and association.

== Parliamentary opposition (1906–1917) ==
When the Second Duma was convened on 20 February 1907, the Kadets found themselves in a difficult position. Their leadership was not represented in the Duma after the Vyborg Manifesto fiasco and their numbers were reduced to about 100. Although still the largest faction in the Duma, they no longer dominated the parliament and their attempts to concentrate on lawmaking were frustrated by radicals on the left and on the right who saw the Duma as a propaganda tool. Although the Kadets had moderated their position in the Second Duma, they refused to vote in May 1907 for a resolution denouncing revolutionary violence which gave the government of Pyotr Stolypin a pretext to dissolve the Second Duma on 3 June 1907 and change the electoral law to drastically limit the representation of leftist and liberal parties.

Due to the changes in the electoral law, the Kadets were reduced to a relatively small (54 seats) opposition group in the Third Duma (1907–1912). Although excluded from the more important Duma committees, the Kadets were not entirely powerless and could determine the outcome of certain votes when allied with the centrist Octobrist faction against right-wing nationalist deputies. With the revolution crushed by 1908, they moderated their position even further as they voted to denounce revolutionary violence, no longer sought confrontation with the government and concentrated on influencing legislation whenever possible. By 1909, Miliukov could claim that the Kadets were now "the opposition of His Majesty, not the opposition to His Majesty", which caused only moderate dissent among the left-leaning faction of the party.

Although the Kadets, allied with the Progressive faction and the Octobrists, were able to push some liberal bills (religious freedoms, freedom of the press and of the labor unions) through the Duma, the bills were either diluted by the upper house of the parliament or vetoed by the tsar. The failure of their legislative program further discredited the Kadets' strategy of peaceful change through gradual reform.

In 1910, the government rekindled its pre-revolutionary Russification campaign in an attempt to restrict minority rights, notably drastically curtailing Finland's autonomy. Most Kadets were opposed to these policies and allied with the left wing of the Octobrists tried to blunt them as much as possible, but they were unsuccessful. However, a minority of Kadets headed by Pyotr Struve supported a moderate version of Russification, which threatened to split the party. With the increase in popular discontent after the Lena massacre on 4 April 1912 and a continuous decline in party membership after 1906, the rift in the party became more pronounced. Kadet leaders on the left like Central Committee member Nikolai Vissarionovich Nekrasov argued that the Duma experience had been a failure and that "constructive work" was pointless under an autocratic government. Kadet leaders on the right like Central Committee members Vasily Maklakov, Mikhail Chelnokov, Nikolai Gredeskul and Ariadna Tyrkova-Williams argued for a shift to the right. The disagreements were temporarily put aside in July 1914 at the outbreak of World War I when the Kadets unconditionally supported the government and found an outlet for their energies in various kinds of relief work under the umbrella of the All-Russian Union of Zemstvos and the All-Russian Union of Cities.

Once the initial outburst of national unity feelings died down in mid-1915 as Russian retreat from Galicia showed the government's incompetence, the Kadets, together with the Progressive faction, the Octobrist faction and a part of the Nationalist faction in the Duma, formed the Progressive Bloc in August 1915 which was critical of the government's prosecution of the war and demanded a government of "popular confidence". As Russia's defeats in the war multiplied, the Kadets' opposition became more pronounced, culminating in Miliukov's speech in the Duma in October 1916 when he all but accused government ministers of treason.

== 1917 Revolution ==
Logo of Svoboda i Kultura [Let There Be Light! "Freedom and Culture" 1917], a Kadet magazine put out by Semyon Frank in 1917

During the February Revolution of 1917, Kadet deputies in the Duma and other prominent Kadets formed the core of the newly formed Russian Provisional Government with five portfolios. Although exercising limited power in a situation known as dual power, the Provisional Government immediately attempted to deal with issues of the many nationalities in the Russian Empire. They introduced legislation abolishing all limitations based on religion and nationality and introduced an element of self-determination by transferring power from governors-general to local representatives. They issued a decree recognising Polish autonomy, more as a symbolic gesture in light of the German occupation of this territory. However, this tendency was limited as most of the ministers feared a break up of the empire. One of the Kadet leaders, Prince Lvov, became Prime Minister and Miliukov became Russia's Foreign Minister. A radical party just 11 years earlier, after the February Revolution the Kadets occupied the rightmost end of the political spectrum since all monarchist parties had been dissolved and the Kadets were the only openly functioning non-socialist party remaining.

The Kadets' position in the Provisional Government was compromised when Miliukov's promise to the Entente allies to continue the war (18 April) was made public on 26 April. The resulting government crisis led to Miliukov's resignation and a power-sharing agreement with moderate socialist parties on 4–5 May. The Kadets' position was further eroded during the July crisis when they resigned from the government in protest against concessions to the Ukrainian independence movement. The coalition was reformed later in July under Alexander Kerensky and survived yet another government crisis in early September. Sergei Fedorovich Oldenburg was Minister of Education and served briefly as chair of the short-lived Commission on Nationality Affairs. The Kadets had become a liability for their socialist coalition partners and an evidence of the treason of the moderated socialists, exposed by Bolshevik propaganda. By the summer of 1917, many prominent Kadets were supporters of Lavr Kornilov during the Kornilov affair.

With the Bolshevik seizure of power on 25–26 October and subsequent transfer of political power to the Soviets, Kadet and other anti-Bolshevik newspapers were closed down and the party was suppressed by the new regime because of its support for Kornilov and Kaledin.

== Russian Civil War and decline (1918–1940) ==
After the Bolshevik victory in the Russian Civil War, most of the Kadet leadership was forced to emigrate and continued publishing newspapers abroad ("Vozrojdénie") until World War II. However, Oldenburg negotiated a working relationship between the Russian Academy of Science and the Bolsheviks, signing an agreement that the Academy supported the Soviet State in February 1918.

== Refoundation ==
A party called Constitutional Democratic Party – Party of Popular Freedom was founded in the then-Russian SFSR in 1990 and based on the program of the historical Kadet party. However, the party soon drifted into hardline nationalist politics and joined the national-communist National Salvation Front and supported the Supreme Soviet against President Yeltsin.

== List of prominent Kadets ==
- Konstantin Balmont
- Nikolai Gredeskul
- Nikolai Ivanovich Kareev
- Vasily Klyuchevsky
- Alexander Alexandrovich Kornilov
- Solomon Krym
- Prince Georgy Lvov
- Vasily Maklakov
- Pavel Milyukov
- Sergey Muromtsev
- Vladimir Dmitrievich Nabokov
- Nikolai Vissarionovich Nekrasov
- Sergei Fedorovich Oldenburg
- Moisei Yakovlevich Ostrogorsky
- Sofia Panina
- Igor Stravinsky
- Pyotr Struve
- Ariadna Tyrkova-Williams
- Mykola Vasylenko
- Vladimir Vernadsky
- Maxim Vinaver

== Electoral history ==
=== State Duma ===
Year	Party leader	Performance			Status	
Year	Party leader	Votes	Percentage	Seats	Status	
1906	Pavel Milyukov	Unknown	Unknown	184 / 477	1st	Majority
1907 (January)	Pavel Milyukov	Unknown	Unknown	98 / 518	2nd	Minority
1907 (October)	Pavel Milyukov	Unknown	Unknown	54 / 442	2nd	Minority
1912	Pavel Milyukov	Unknown	Unknown	59 / 442	4th	Minority

=== Constitutional Assembly ===
Year	Party leader	Performance			Status	
Year	Party leader	Votes	Percentage	Seats	Status	
1917	Pavel Milyukov	2,088,000	4.7%	16 / 703	3rd	Minority

== See also ==
- Contributions to liberal theory
- Liberal democracy
- Liberalism by country
- Liberalism in Russia
- Liberalism
- List of liberal parties
