= Pavel Milyukov =

Russian historian and politician (1859–1943)

- Павел Милюков
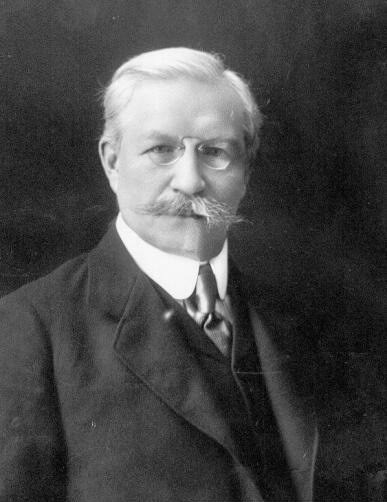
- Milyukov in 1916

Member of the Russian Constituent Assembly
- In office 25 November 1917 – 20 January 1918 (Note: The Constituent Assembly was declared dissolved by the Bolshevik-Left SR Soviet government, rendering the end the term served.)
- Preceded by: Constituency established
- Succeeded by: Constituency abolished
- Constituency: Petrograd Metropolis

Minister of Foreign Affairs (Note: Foreign Minister of the Russian Provisional Government.)
- In office 2 March – 20 May 1917
- Monarchs: Nicholas II; Emperor Michael II
- Prime Minister: Georgy Lvov
- Preceded by: Nikolai Pokrovsky (for Russian Empire)
- Succeeded by: Mikhail Tereshchenko

Member of the Russian State Duma
- In office March–April 1906 – 6 October 1917

Personal details
- Born: Pavel Nikolayevich Miliukov; 27 January 1859 Moscow, Russian Empire
- Died: 31 March 1943 (aged 84) Aix-les-Bains, Savoie, France
- Resting place: Batignolles Cemetery, Paris
- Party: Constitutional Democratic
- Spouse: Anna Miliukova
- Education: Imperial Moscow University (1882)
- Occupation: Politician; Author; Historian
- Pavel Miliukov's voice Speech from Miliukov in the Russian State Duma, 1909.

Pavel Nikolayevich Milyukov (Note: Also transliterated Milyukov. His name is sometimes rendered in English as Paul Miliukov or Paul Milukoff.) (Russian: Па́вел Никола́евич Милюко́в, IPA: [mʲɪlʲʊˈkof]; 27 January [O.S. 15 January] 1859 – 31 March 1943) was a Russian historian and liberal politician. Milyukov was the founder, leader, and the most prominent member of the Constitutional Democratic party (known as the Kadets). He changed his view on the monarchy between 1905 and 1917. In the Russian Provisional Government, he served as Foreign Minister, working to prevent Russia's exit from the First World War.

== Pre-revolutionary career ==
Pavel was born in Moscow in the upper-class family of Nikolai Pavlovich Milyukov, a professor in architecture who taught at the Moscow School of Painting, Sculpture and Architecture. Milyukov was a member of the House of Milukoff. Milyukov studied history and philology at the Moscow University, where he was influenced by Herbert Spencer, Auguste Comte, and Karl Marx. His teachers were Vasily Klyuchevsky and Paul Vinogradoff. In summer 1877 he briefly took part in the Russo-Turkish War as a military logistic, but returned to the university. He was expelled for taking part in student riots, went to Italy, but was readmitted and allowed to take his degree. He specialized in the study of Russian history and in 1885 received the degree for work on the State Economics of Russia in the First Quarter of the 18th Century and the reforms of Peter the Great.

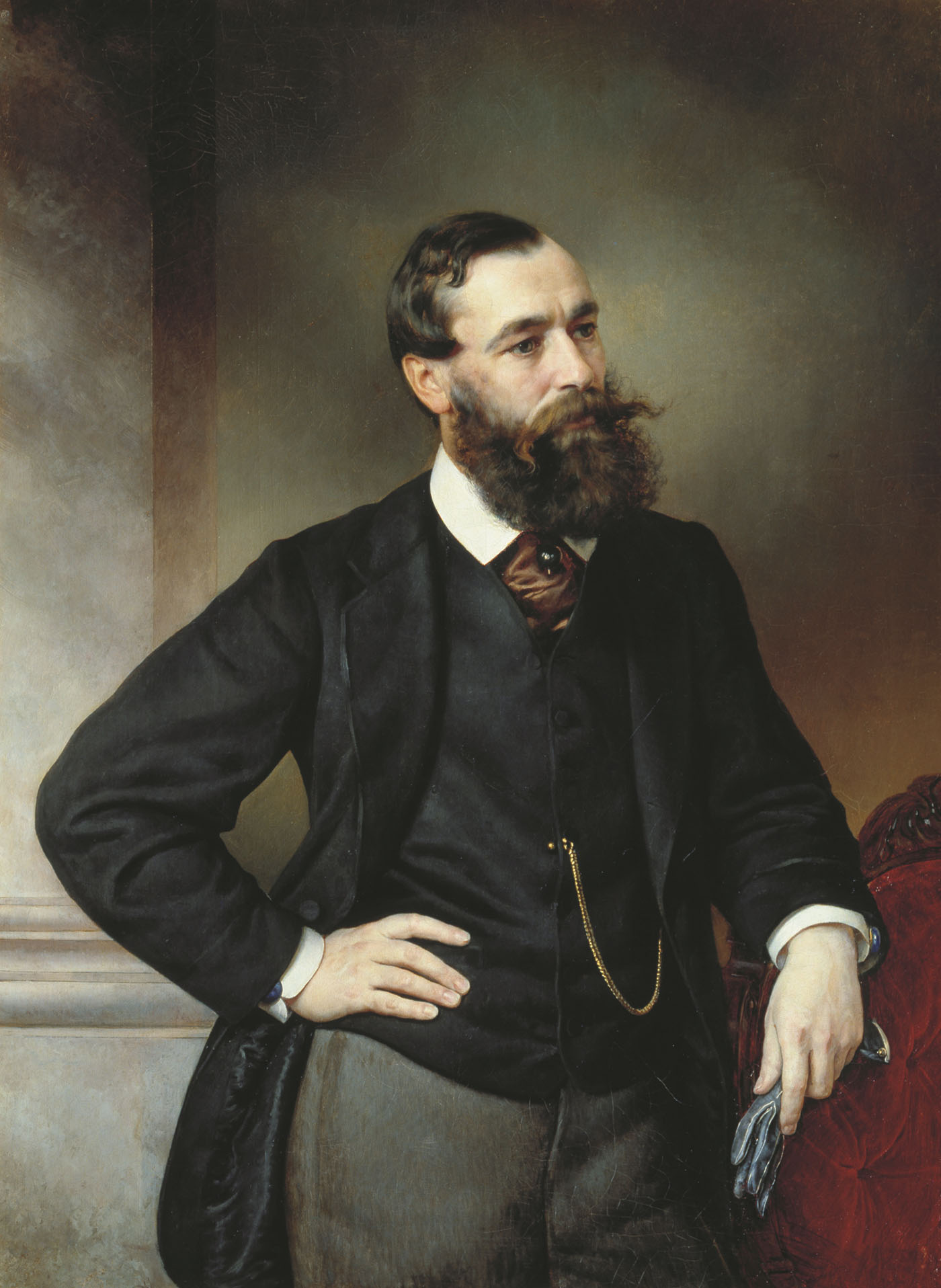
Boris Chicherin

In 1890 he became a member of the Moscow Society of Russian History and Antiquities. He gave private lectures with great success at a training institute for girl teachers and in 1895 was appointed to the university. These lectures were afterward expanded by him in his book Outlines of Russian Culture (3 vols., 1896–1903, translated into several languages). He started an association for "home university reading," and, as its first president, edited the first volume of its program, which was widely read in Russian intellectual circles. As a student Milyukov was influenced by the liberal ideas of Konstantin Kavelin and Boris Chicherin. His liberal opinions brought him into conflict with the educational authorities, and he was dismissed in 1894 after one of the ever-recurrent university "riots". He was imprisoned for two years in Riazan as a political agitator, but contributed as an archaeologist.

When released from jail, Milyukov went to Bulgaria, and was appointed professor in the University of Sofia, where he lectured in Bulgarian in the philosophy of history, etc. He was sent (or dismissed under Russian pressure) to Macedonia, part of the Ottoman Empire. There he worked in an archaeological site. In 1899 he was allowed to return to St Petersburg. In 1901 he was arrested again for taking part in a commemoration of the populist writer Pyotr Lavrov (The last volume of Outlines of Russian Culture was actually finished in jail, where he spent six months for his political speech). In 1901, according to Milyukov, about 16,000 people were exiled from the capital. The following by-law, published in 1902 by the governor of Bessarabia, is typical:

Forbidden are all gatherings, meetings, and assemblies on streets, market-places, and other public places, whatever aim they may have. All meetings in private houses for the aim of discussing the statutes of associations for which the permission of the government is necessary are permitted only with the knowledge and approval of the police, who have to give permission for each gathering separately, on an appointed day and in an appointed place.

He contributed under a pseudonym to the clandestine journal Liberation, founded by Peter Berngardovich Struve, published in Stuttgart in 1902. The government again gave him the choice of exile for three years or jail for six months, Milyukov chose the Kresty Prison. After an interview with Vyacheslav von Plehve, whom he regarded as "the symbol of the Russia he hated", Milyukov was released. He was central in the founding of the Union of Unions in 1905.

In 1903 he delivered courses of lectures in the United States at summer sessions in University of Chicago and for the Lowell Institute lectures in Boston. He visited London and attended the Paris Conference 1904, organized by the Finnish dissident Konni Zilliacus. Milyukov returned to Russia during the Russian Revolution of 1905, according to Orlando Figes in many ways a foretaste of the conflicts of 1917. He founded the Constitutional Democratic party, a party of professors, academics, lawyers, writers, journalists, teachers, doctors, officials, and liberal zemstvo men. As a journalist for "Svobodny narod" ("Free People") and "Narodnaya swoboda" ("People's Freedom") or as a former political prisoner Milyukov was not allowed to represent the Kadets in the first and second Duma. For Milyukov any agreement between liberalism and autocracy was impossible. In 1906 the Duma was dissolved and its members moved to Vyborg in Finland. Milyukov drafted the Vyborg Manifesto, calling for political freedom, reforms, and passive resistance to the governmental policy.

Dmitri Trepov suggested Ivan Goremykin ought to step down and promote a cabinet with only Kadets, which in his opinion would soon enter into a violent conflict with the Tsar and fail. He secretly met with Milyukov. Trepov opposed Pyotr Stolypin, who promoted a coalition cabinet.

The Kadets gave up the idea of founding a republic and began promoting a constitutional monarchy. Georgy Lvov and Alexander Guchkov tried to convince the tsar to accept liberals in the new government. In 1907 Milyukov was elected in the Third Duma; at some time he joined the board of the party Rech (newspaper). He was one of the few publicists in Russia, who had considerable knowledge of international politics, and his articles on the Near East seem to be of considerable interest.

== Deputy ==
In January 1908 Milyukov addressed "The Civic Forum" in Carnegie Hall. From the very beginning, the slogan and the idea of the empire ruled by Russians were very controversial regarding what "Russians" meant. One of the outspoken critics of the notion, Pavel Milyukov, considered the "Russia for Russians" slogan to have been "a slogan of disunity... [and] not creative but destructive." In 1909, Milyukov addressed the Russian State Duma on the issue of using Ukrainian in the court system, attacking Russian nationalist deputies: "You say "Russia for Russians," but whom do you mean by "Russian"? You should say "Russia only for the Great Russians," because that which you do not give to Muslims and Jews you also do not give your own nearest kin – Ukraine."

In 1912 he was reelected in the Fourth Duma. According to Milyukov, in May 1914 Rasputin had become an influential factor in Russian politics. With the outbreak of World War I in August 1914, Milyukov swung to the right, but a coup to remove the Tsar belonged to the possibilities. He had become a nationalist, patriotic policy of national defense, relying on social chauvinism. (He was best friends with Sergei Sazonov.) Milyukov insisted his younger son volunteer for the army (who subsequently died in battle). In August 1915 he formed the Progressive Bloc and became the leader. Milyukov was regarded as a staunch supporter of the conquest of Constantinople. In the nineties, Milyukov thoroughly studied the Balkans, which made him the most competent authority on Balkan politics. His opponents mockingly called him "Milyukov of Dardanelles". In Summer 1916, at the request of Rodzianko, Protopopov led a delegation of Duma members (with Milyukov) to strengthen the ties with Russia's western allies in World War I: the Entente powers. In August he gave lectures in Oxford. On 1 November 1916, in a populist speech, he sharply criticized the Stürmer government for its inefficiency. He met professor Tomáš Masaryk in London, and consulted with him about the present state of the Czechoslovak Legion in Russia at that time.

=== "Stupidity or treason" speech ===
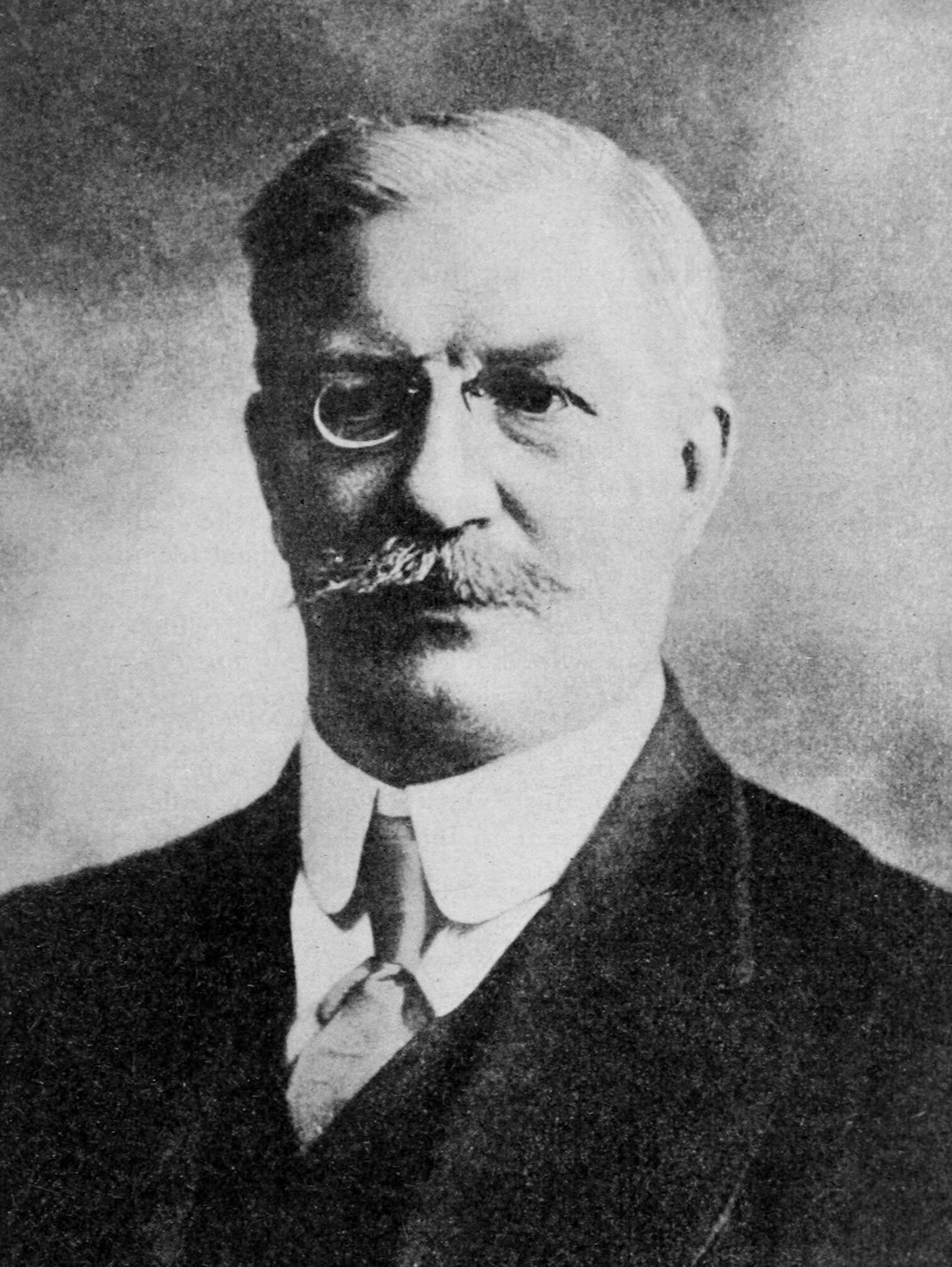
Pavel Milyukov succeeded in firing the engines of radical protest in the country. Such was not his intention.

At Progressive Bloc meetings near the end of October, Progressives and left-Kadets argued that the revolutionary public mood could no longer be ignored and that the Duma should attack the entire tsarist system or lose whatever influence it had. Nationalists feared that a concerted stand against the government would jeopardize the existence of the Duma and further inflame the revolutionary feelings. Miliukov argued for and secured a tenuous adherence to a middle-ground tactic, attacking Boris Stürmer and forcing his replacement.

According to Stockdale, he had trouble gaining the support of his own party; at the 22–24 October Kadet fall conference provincial delegates "lashed out at Miliukov with unaccustomed ferocity. His travels abroad had made him poorly informed about the public mood, they charged; the patience of the people was exhausted." He responded with a plea to keep their ultimate goal in mind:

It will be our task not to destroy the government, which would only aid anarchy, but to instill in it a completely different content, that is, to build a genuine constitutional order. That is why, in our struggle with the government, despite everything, we must retain a sense of proportion... To support anarchy in the name of the struggle with the government would be to risk all the political conquests we have made since 1905.

The day before the opening of the Duma, the Progressive Party pulled out of the bloc because they believed the situation called for more than a mere denunciation of Stürmer.

On 1 November (O.S.) the government under the pro-peace Boris Stürmer was attacked in the Imperial Duma, not gathering since February. Alexander Kerensky spoke first, called the ministers "hired assassins" and "cowards" and said they were "guided by the contemptible Grishka [or Grigori] Rasputin!" The acting president Rodzianko ordered him to leave, when calling for the overthrow of the government in wartime. Miliukov's speech was more than three times longer than Kerensky's, and delivered using much more moderate language.

In his speech "Rasputin and Rasputuiza" he spoke of "treachery and betrayal, about the dark forces, fighting in favor of Germany". He highlighted numerous governmental failures, including the case Sukhomlinov, concluding that Stürmer's policies placed in jeopardy the Triple Entente. After each accusation – many times without basis – he asked "Is this stupidity or is it treason?" and the listeners answered "stupidity!", "treason!", etc. (Milyukov stated that it did not matter "Choose any ... as the consequences are the same.") Stürmer walked out, followed by all his ministers.

He began by outlining how public hope had been lost over the course of the war, saying: "We have lost faith that the government can lead us to victory." He mentioned the rumours of treason and then proceeded to discuss some of the allegations: that Stürmer had freed Suchomlinov, that there was a great deal of pro-German propaganda, that he had been told that the enemy had access to Russian state secrets in his visits to allied countries and that Stürmer's private secretary [Ivan Manuilov-Manasevich] had been arrested for taking German bribes but was released when he kicked back to Stürmer.

Milyukov was taken immediately by Sir George Buchanan to the British Embassy and lived there till the February Revolution; (according to Stockdale he went to the Crimea). It is not known what they discussed, but his speech was spread in flyers on the front and at the Hinterland. Stürmer and Protopopov asked in vain for the dissolution of the Duma. Tsarina Alexandra suggested to her husband to expel Alexander Guchkov, Prince Lvov, Milyukov and Alexei Polivanov to Siberia.

According to Melissa Kirschke Stockdale, it was a "volatile combination of revolutionary passions, escalating apprehension, and the near breakdown of unity in the moderate camp that provided the impetus for the most notorious address in the history of the Duma ...". The speech was a milestone on the road to Rasputin's murder and the February Revolution. Stockdale also points out that Miliukov admitted to some reservations about his evidence in his memoirs, where he observed that his listeners resolutely answered treason "even in those aspects where I myself was not entirely sure."

Richard Abraham, in his biography of Kerensky, argues that the withdrawal of the Progressists was essentially a vote of no confidence in Miliukov and that he grasped at the idea of accusing Stürmer in an effort to preserve his own influence.

== February Revolution ==
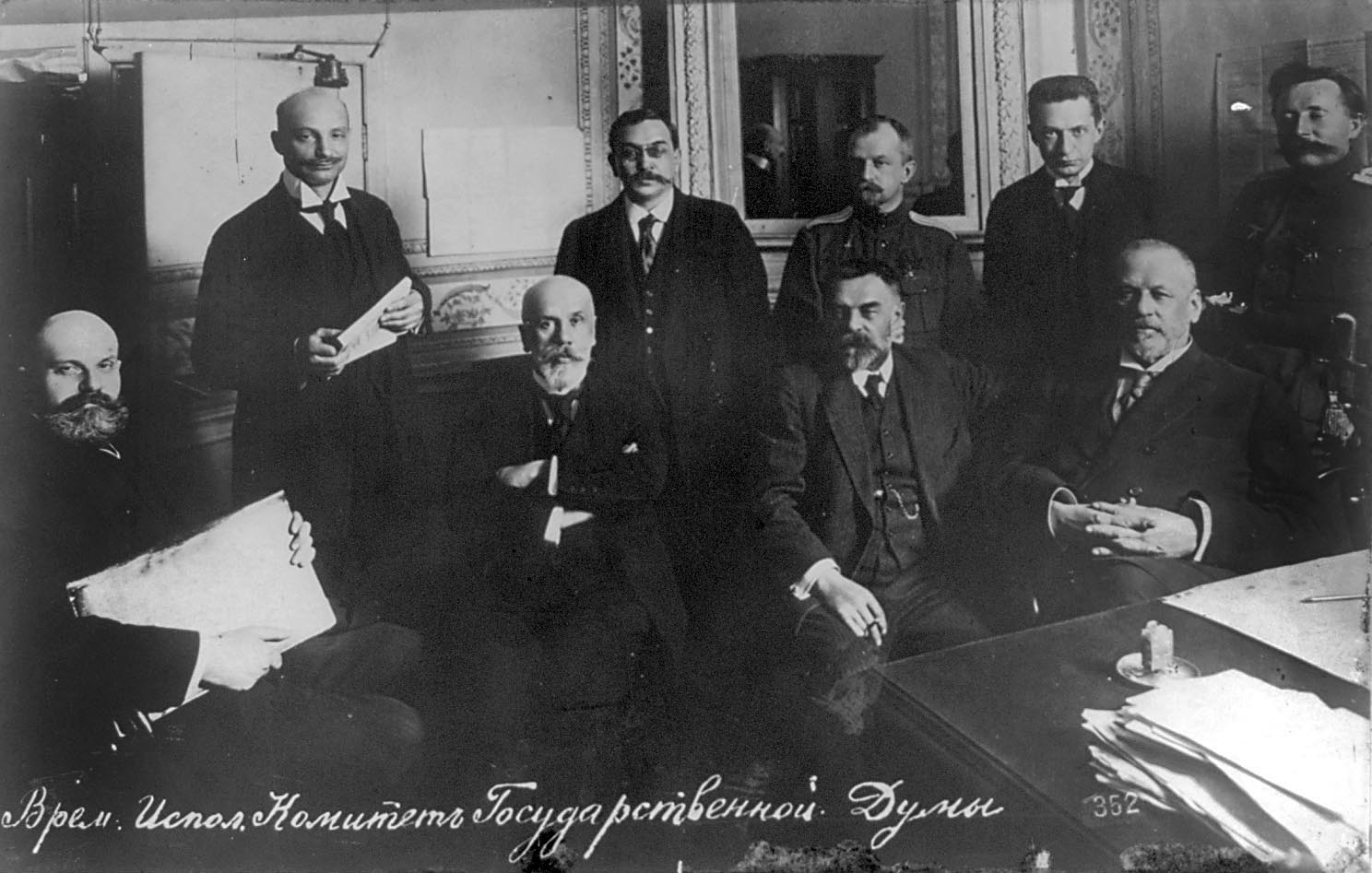
Members of the Provisional Committee of the State Duma (Russian Empire) in 1917

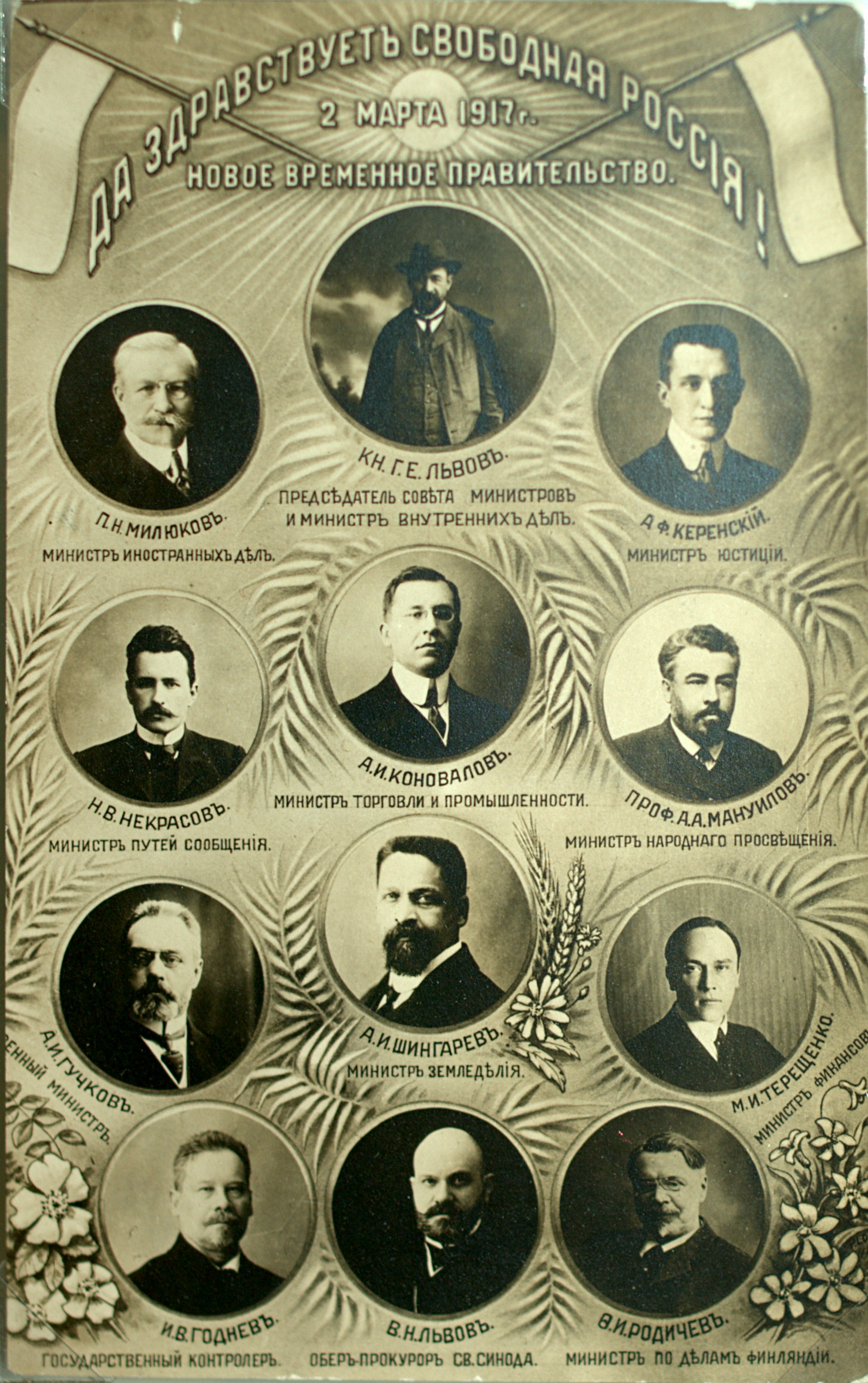
Russian Provisional Government

During the February Revolution Milyukov hoped to retain the constitutional monarchy in Russia. He became a member of the Provisional Committee of the State Duma on 27 February 1917. Milyukov wanted the monarchy retained, albeit with Alexei as Tsar and the Grand Duke Michael acting as Regent. When Michael awoke on 2 March (O.S.), he discovered not only that his brother had abdicated in his favour, as Nicholas had not informed him previously, but also that a delegation from the Duma would visit him in a few hours. The meeting with Duma President Rodzianko, Prince Lvov, and other ministers, including Milyukov and Kerensky, lasted all morning. Since the masses would not tolerate a new Tsar and the Duma could not guarantee Michael's safety, Michael decided to decline the throne. On 6 March 1917, David Lloyd George gave a cautious welcome to the suggestion of Milyukov that the toppled Tsar and his family could be given sanctuary in Britain, but Lloyd George would have preferred that they go to a neutral country.

Rodzianko succeeded in publishing an order for the immediate return of the soldiers to their barracks, subordinate to their officers. To them, Rodzianko was totally unacceptable as prime minister and Prince Lvov, less unpopular, became the leader of the new cabinet. In the first Provisional government Miliukov became Minister of Foreign Affairs, taking over the ministry from deputy minister Anatoly Neratov who had held the office temporarily.

Miliukov sent the British an official request for revolutionary Leon Trotsky to be released from Amherst Internment Camp in Nova Scotia, after the British had boarded a steamer in Halifax harbour to arrest Trotsky and other "dangerous socialists" who were en route to Russia from New York. Upon receiving Milykov's request the British freed Trotsky, who then continued his journey to Russia and became a key planner and leader of the Bolshevik Revolution that overthrew the provisional government.

He staunchly opposed popular demands for peace at any cost and firmly clung to Russia's wartime alliances. As the Britannica 2004 put it, "he was too inflexible to succeed in practical politics". On 20 April 1917, the government sent a note to Britain and France (which became known as the Milyukov note) proclaiming that Russia would fulfill its obligation towards the Allies and wage the war as long as it was necessary. On the same day, "thousands of armed workers and soldiers came out to demonstrate on the street of Petrograd. Many of them carried banners with slogans calling for the removal of the "ten bourgeois ministers', for an end to the war and for the appointment of a new revolutionary government. The next day the Milyukov Note was condemned by the ministers. This resolved the immediate crisis. On 29 April, the minister of war Alexander Guchkov resigned, and Milyukov's resignation followed on 2 or 4 May. Milyukov was offered a post as Secretary of Education, but refused; he stayed on as the Kadet leader and began to flirt with counter-revolutionary ideas.

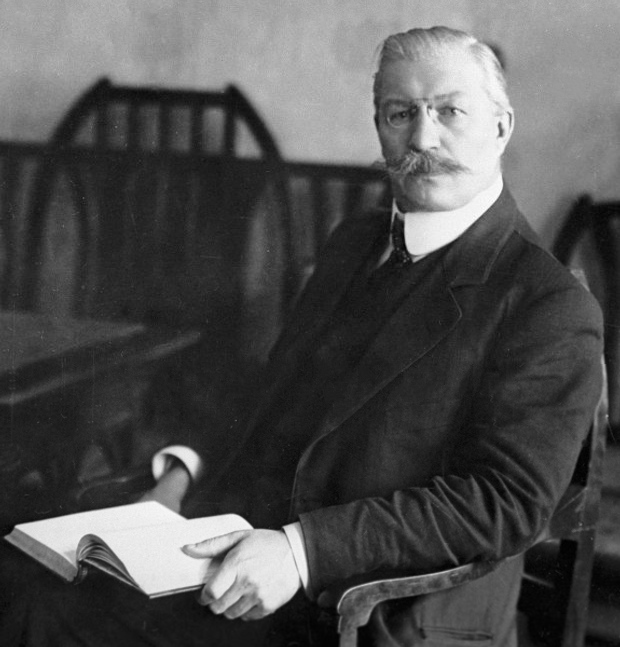
Pavel Milyukov c. 1917

=== Kornilov Affair ===
In the mass discontent following the July Days, mainly about Ukrainian autonomy, the Russian populace grew highly skeptical of the Provisional Government's abilities to alleviate the economic distress and social resentment among the lower classes; the word 'provisional' did not command respect. The crowd tired of war and hunger demanded a "peace without annexations or contributions". Milyukov described the situation in Russia in late July as, "Chaos in the army, chaos in foreign policy, chaos in industry and chaos in the nationalist questions". Lavr Kornilov, appointed commander-in-chief of the Russian army in July 1917, considered the Petrograd Soviet responsible for the breakdown in the military in recent times, and believed that the Russian Provisional Government lacked the power and confidence to dissolve the Petrograd Soviet. Following several ambiguous correspondences between Kornilov and Alexander Kerensky, Kornilov commanded an assault on the Petrograd Soviet.

Because the Petrograd Soviet was able to quickly gather a powerful army of workers and soldiers in defense of the Revolution, Kornilov's coup was an abysmal failure and he was placed under arrest. The Kornilov Affair resulted in significantly increased distrust among Russians towards the Provisional Government.

== Exile ==
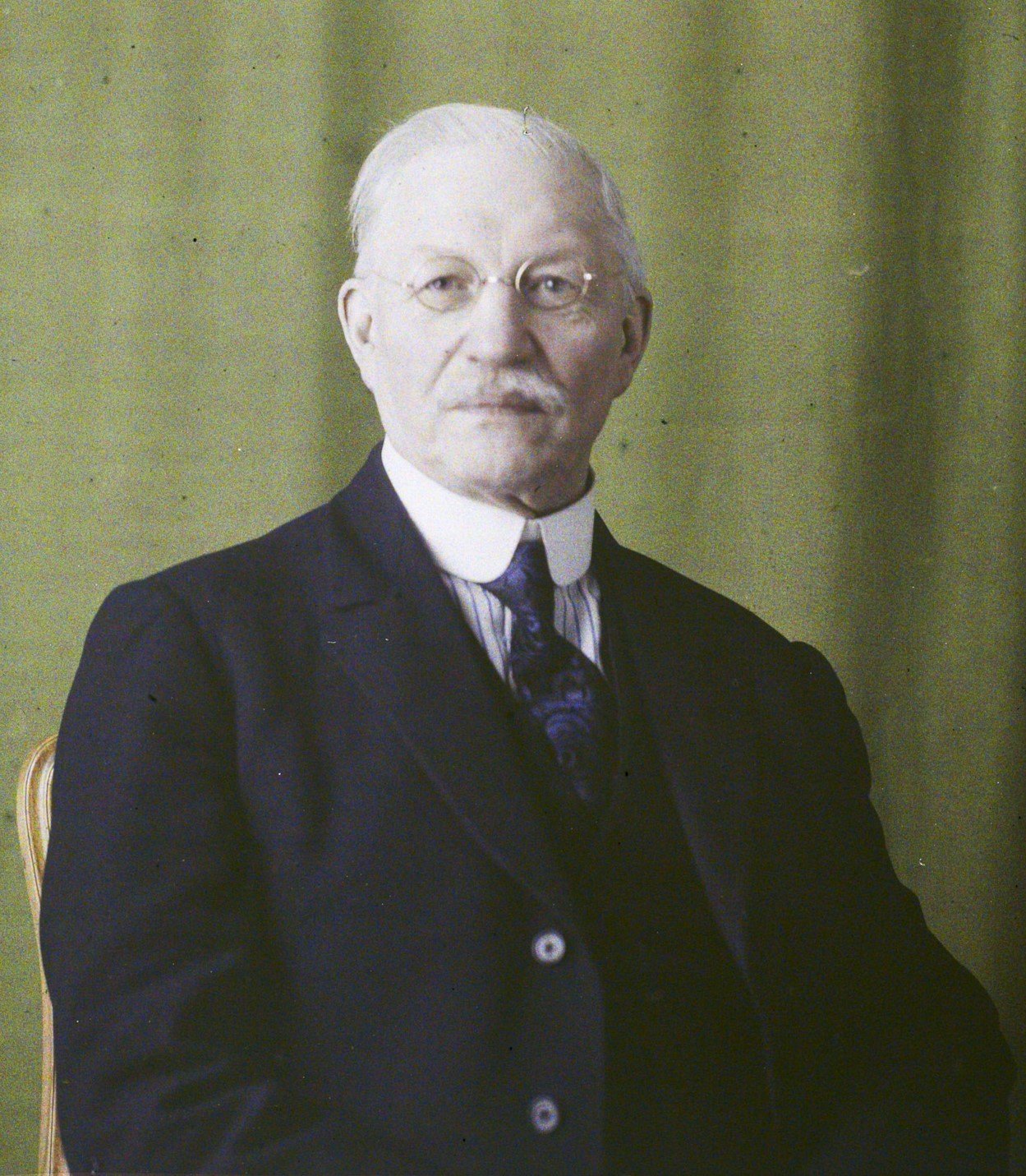
Autochrome portrait by Georges Chevalier, photographer (1921)

On 26 October 1917, the party's newspapers were shut down by the new Soviet Government. On 25 November 1917 Milyukov was elected in the Russian Constituent Assembly, the first truly free election in Russian history. On 11 December the party was banned by the Soviets and went underground. Milyukov moved from Petrograd to the Don Host Oblast. There he became a member of the Don civil council. He advised Mikhail Alekseyev of the Volunteer Army. Milyukov and Struve defended a Great Russia as firmly as the most reactionary monarchist. In May 1918 he went to Kiev, where he negotiated with the German high command to act together against the Bolsheviks. For many members of the Cadet Party, this went too far: Milyukov was forced to resign the presidency of the KDP Central Committee.

Milyukov went to Turkey and from there to Western Europe, to get support from the allies of the White movement, involved in the Russian Civil War. In April 1921 he immigrated to France, where he remained active in politics and edited the Russian-language newspaper Poslednie novosti (Latest News) (1920–1940). In June 1921 he left the Constitutional Democrats, following a division in the party. Miliukov had called on exiles to abandon hopes in counterrevolution at home, and instead to place their hopes in the peasantry to rise up against the hated Bolshevik regime. The debate between Milyukov and Vasily Maklakov began with Maklakov's criticism of the Constitutional Democratic Party.

Assassination attempt

During a performance of the Berliner Philharmonie on 28 March 1922, his friend Vladimir Dmitrievich Nabokov, the father of the novelist Vladimir Nabokov, was killed while shielding Milyukov from an assassination attempt by Pyotr Shabelsky-Bork and Sergey Taboritsky, both of which were monarchists and later Nazi collaborators.

In 1934, Milyukov was a witness at the Berne Trial.

Although he remained an opponent of the communist regime, Milyukov supported Stalin's "imperial" foreign policy. On the Winter War he commented as follows: "I feel pity for the Finns, but I am for the Vyborg guberniya". Already in 1933 he had stated in Prague that, in case of a war between Germany and the USSR, "the emigration must be unconditionally on the side of the Homeland". He supported the Soviet Union in its war effort against Nazi Germany and refused all Nazi rapprochements. He sincerely rejoiced at the Soviet victory in Stalingrad.

Death

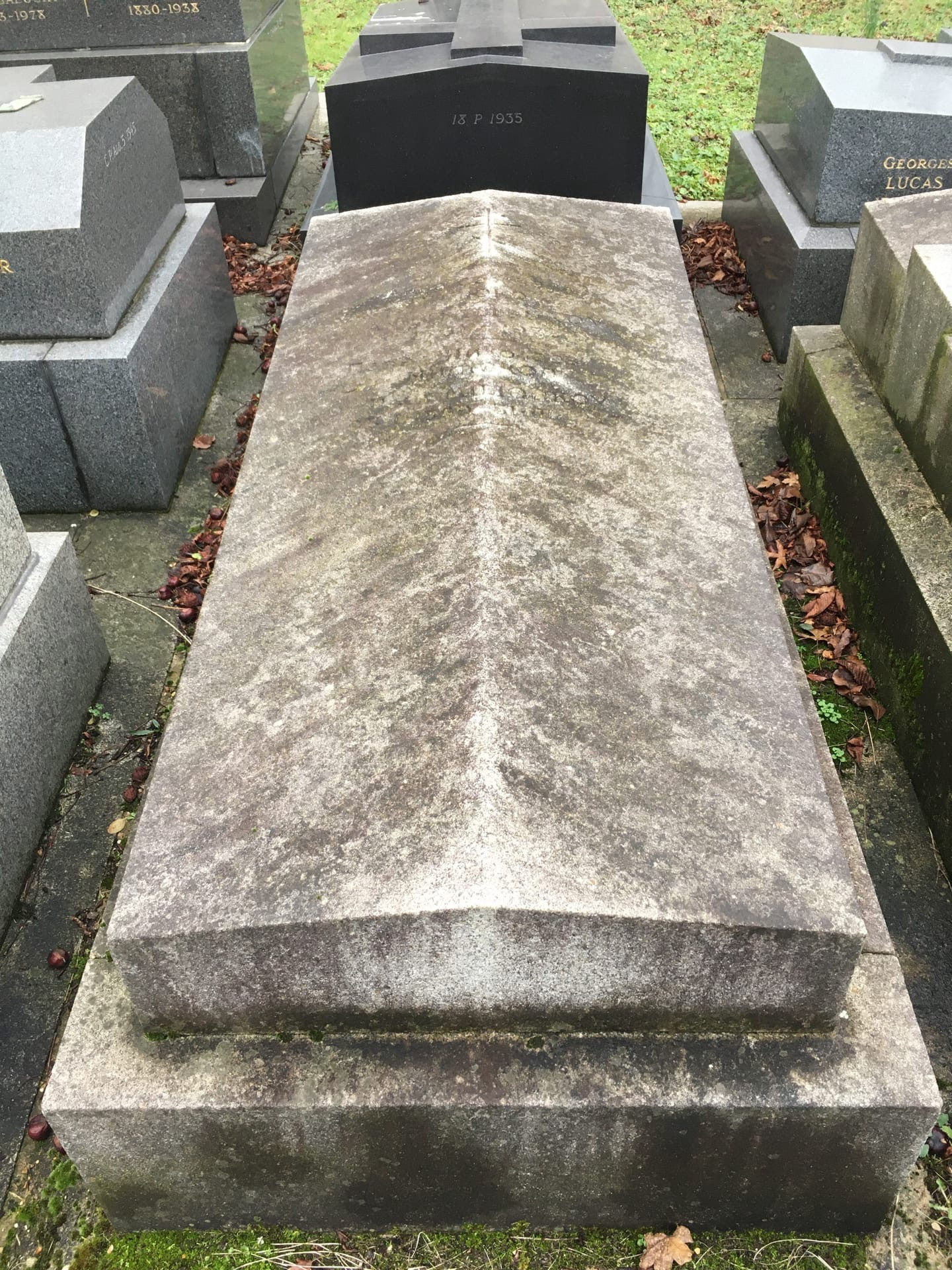
Milyukov's grave

Milyukov died in 1943, in Aix-les-Bains, France. Sometime between 1945 and 1954 his body was reburied at Batignolles Cemetery, division 30, next to his wife, Anna Sergeievna.

== Works ==
- Works by or about Pavel Milyukov at the Internet Archive
- Works by Pavel Milyukov at LibriVox (public domain audiobooks)
- Russia and its crisis (1905) by P.N. Miliukov
- Constitutional government for Russia an address delivered before the Civic forum by P.N. Miliukov. New York city, 14 January 1908 (1908)
- "Past and present of Russian economics" in Russian realities & problems: Lectures delivered at Cambridge in August 1916, by Pavel Milyukov, Peter Struve, Harold Williams, Alexander Lappo-Danilevsky and Roman Dmowski, Cambridge, University Press, 1917, 229p.
- Bolshevism: an international danger by P.N. Miliukov. 1920.
- History of the Second Russian Revolution (1921) by P. Milykov.
- Russia, to-day and to-morrow (1922) by P.N. Miliukov.
- Outlines of Russian Culture, 3 volumes: (1) Religion and the Church, (2) Literature, (3) Architecture, Painting, and Music), 1948.

== Notes ==
Political offices
Preceded by Nikolai Pokrovsky	Foreign Minister of Russia; 2 March – 1 May 1917	Succeeded by Mikhail Tereshchenko
