= Aleksandr Kornilov =

Aleksandr Kornilov may refer to:

- Aleksandr Kornilov (historian) (1862–1925), Russian historian and liberal politician
- Aleksandr Kornilov (rower) (born 1985), Russian Olympic rower
