= Anatoly Neratov =

Russian diplomat (1863–1938)

Anatoly Anatolyevich Neratov
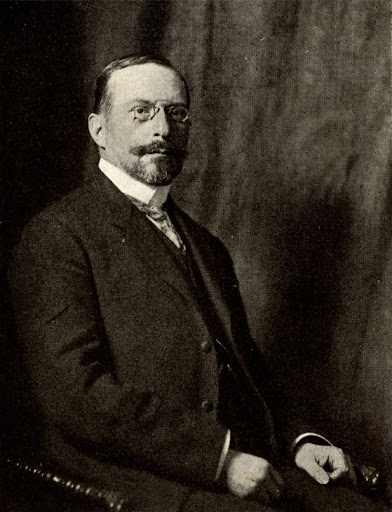
- Born: 2 October 1863; Russia
- Died: 10 April 1938 (aged 74); France
- Occupation: Russian diplomat

Deputy Minister of Foreign Affairs of the Russian Empire
- In office March – 19 December 1911
- Monarch: Nicholas II
- Prime Minister: Pyotr Stolypin; Vladimir Kokovtsov
- Minister of Foreign Affairs: Sergey Sazonov
- In office 23 November – 30 November 1916
- Monarch: Nicholas II
- Prime Minister: Boris Sturmer
- Minister of Foreign Affairs: Boris Sturmer
- In office 15 March 1917
- Monarch: Nicholas II
- Prime Minister: Nikolai Golitsyn
- Minister of Foreign Affairs: Nikolai Pokrovsky

Deputy Minister of Foreign Affairs of the Russian Provisional Government
- In office 15 March – 14 September 1917
- President of the Provisional Government: Georgy Lvov; Alexander Kerensky
- Minister of Foreign Affairs: Pavel Milyukov; Mikhail Tereshchenko

Deputy Minister of Foreign Affairs of the Russian Republic
- In office 14 September – 8 November 1917
- Minister-Chairman: Alexander Kerensky
- Minister of Foreign Affairs: Mikhail Tereshchenko

Acting Minister of Foreign Affairs of the Russian Empire
- In office March – 19 December 1911
- Monarch: Nicholas II
- Prime Minister: Pyotr Stolypin; Vladimir Kokovtsov
- Minister of Foreign Affairs: Sergey Sazonov
- In office 23 November – 30 November 1916
- Monarch: Nicholas II
- Prime Minister: Boris Sturmer
- In office 15 March 1917
- Monarch: Nicholas II
- Prime Minister: Nikolai Golitsyn

Acting Minister of Foreign Affairs of the Russian Republic
- In office 8 November 1917
- Minister-Chairman: Alexander Kerensky
- Minister of Foreign Affairs: Mikhail Tereshchenko

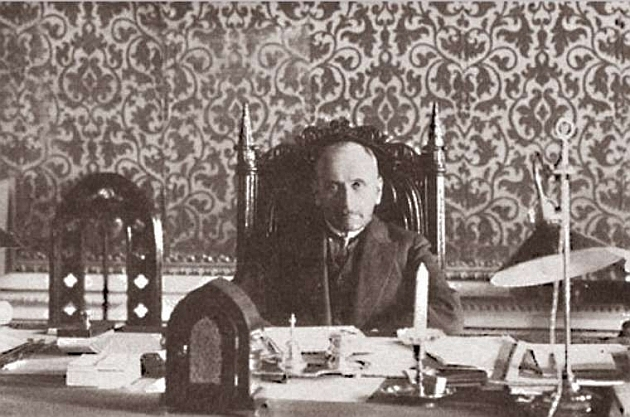
Foreign minister Sergey Sazonov behind his desk in his office. From that desk also Neratov led the ministry in 1911 during Sazonov's long absence

Anatoly Anatolyevich Neratov (Russian: Анатолий Анатольевич Нератов) (2 October 1863 in Russia – 10 April 1938 in Villejuif, France) was a Russian diplomat and an official of the Russian foreign ministry. He was deputy to five foreign ministers of the Tsarist and the Provisional Government.

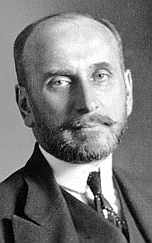
His patron Sergey Sazonov was deputized by Neratov from March to December 1911

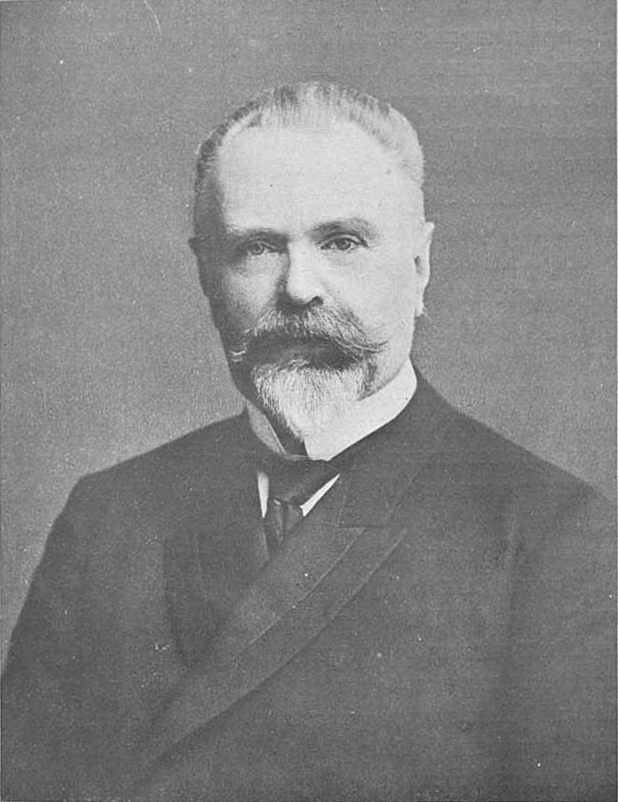
Following Boris Stürmer's downfall in November 1916 his deputy Neratov led the foreign ministry

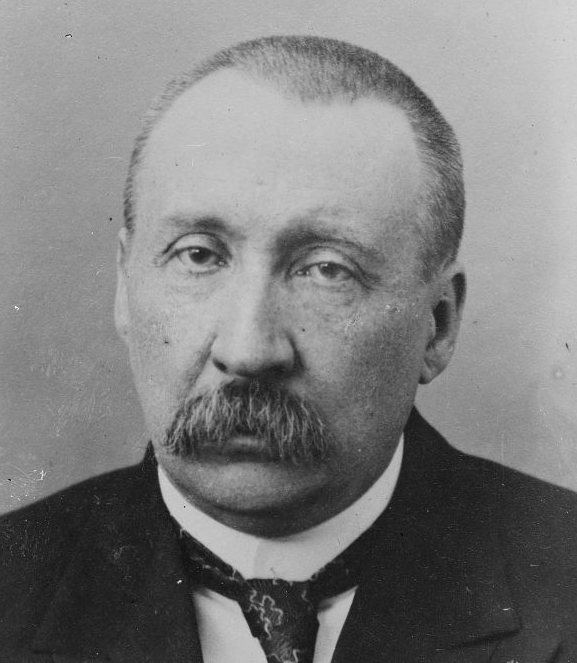
Nikolai Pokrovsky took over the office from Neratov and gave it back to him in February 1917

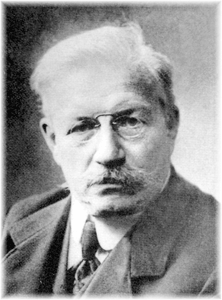
Pavel Milyukov took over the ministry in March 1917 but kept Neratov as his deputy minister

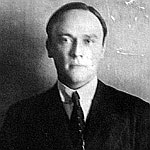
Neratov remained in office under Mikhail Tereshchenko, too, until November 1917

After finishing the Imperial Lyceum in Tsarskoye Selo Neratov joined the Foreign service around 1890. Between 1906 and 1910 he was vice-director of the 1st department of the Russian foreign ministry, from 1910 on until 1917 he then was Permanent Under Secretary of State resp. Deputy Minister of Foreign Affairs. Although Neratov has never been abroad during his long service he temporarily became acting foreign minister four times:

- from March to December 1911 (i. e. during Persian Revolution, Moroccan Crisis and Tripolitanian War) when Sergei Dmitriyevich Sazonov fell ill,
- in November/December 1916 (during World War I) after Boris Vladimirovich Stürmer was dismissed and before Nikolai Nikolayevich Pokrovsky was appointed (in December Neratov became a member of the State Council, too)
- in February/March 1917 (after the February Revolution) when Pokrovsky resigned and before Pavel Nikolayevich Milyukov was appointed
- in October/November 1917 (following the October Revolution) when Mikhail Ivanovich Tereshchenko was arrested temporarily

Leon Trotsky, the new People's Commissar for Foreign Affairs, asked Neratov to subordinate to the Council of People's Commissars and to hand over the secret documents from the diplomatic archives of the foreign ministry. Neratov refused and was eventually deposed and replaced by Ivan Zalkind in November 1917. The secret documents were confiscated and published, however, in January 1918 Neratov claimed that some of these published documents were nothing more than insignificant notices or even forgeries. During the Russian Civil War Nerotov advised the "White" movement – first Anton Ivanovich Denikin, then, from 1920, Denikin's successor Pyotr Nikolayevich Wrangel. Wrangel finally sent Neratov as his ambassador to Istanbul to get support from the Entente. At the end of the Turkish War of Independence, when the Entente gave Istanbul back to the Turks, Neratov fled to France.
