= Mikhail Goldshtik =

Inventor

Mikhail Goldshtik was a Jewish Russian inventor. He is known for inventing the vortex thruster and other futuristic devices that operate by spinning fluids.

== Personal life ==
Mikhail Goldshtik was born in Leningrad, Russia in 1930. In the Siege of Leningrad his parents were killed, and one of his legs was destroyed. He studied at the Leningrad Polytechnic Institute.

Mikhail Goldshtik died during a heart transplant operation in 1997.

== Career ==
Mikhail Goldshtik demonstrated vortex flow devices in Moscow in 1960 at the National Congress on Mechanics, and a special seminar was organised the exhibit his work.

Mikhail Goldshtik invented an air scrubber, and a compact nuclear reactor. His vortex grinder and air scrubber actually made it to production in Russia. Late in life he attempted to make a bladeless helicopter. Another invention was an internal combustion engine using a liquid piston.
