= Aleksandr Kornilov (historian) =

Russian historian and politician (1862–1925)

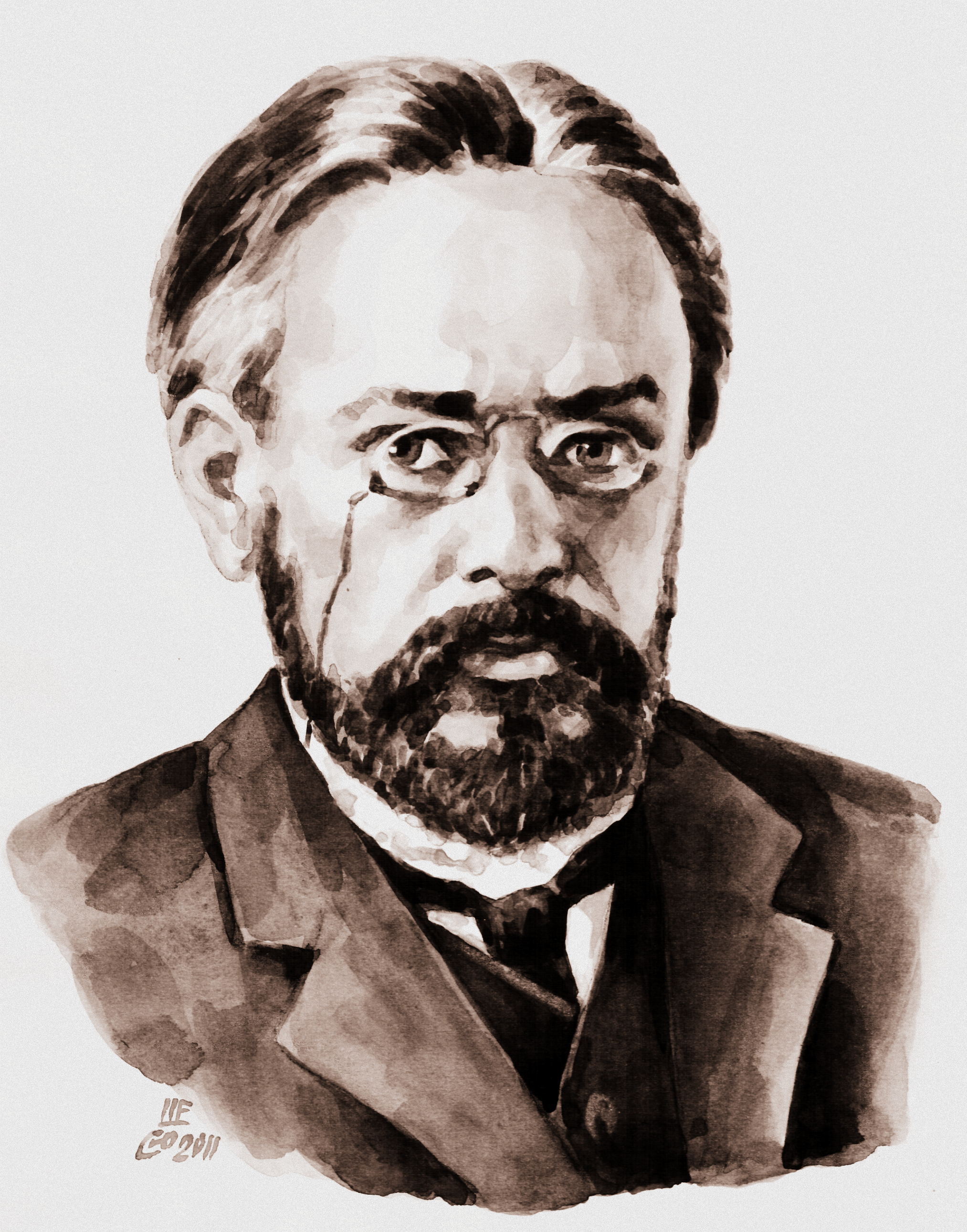
Alexander Kornilov

Alexander Alexandrovich Kornilov (Russian: Алекса́ндр Алекса́ндрович Корни́лов; 30 November 1862 – 26 April 1925) was a Russian historian and liberal politician.

== Biography ==
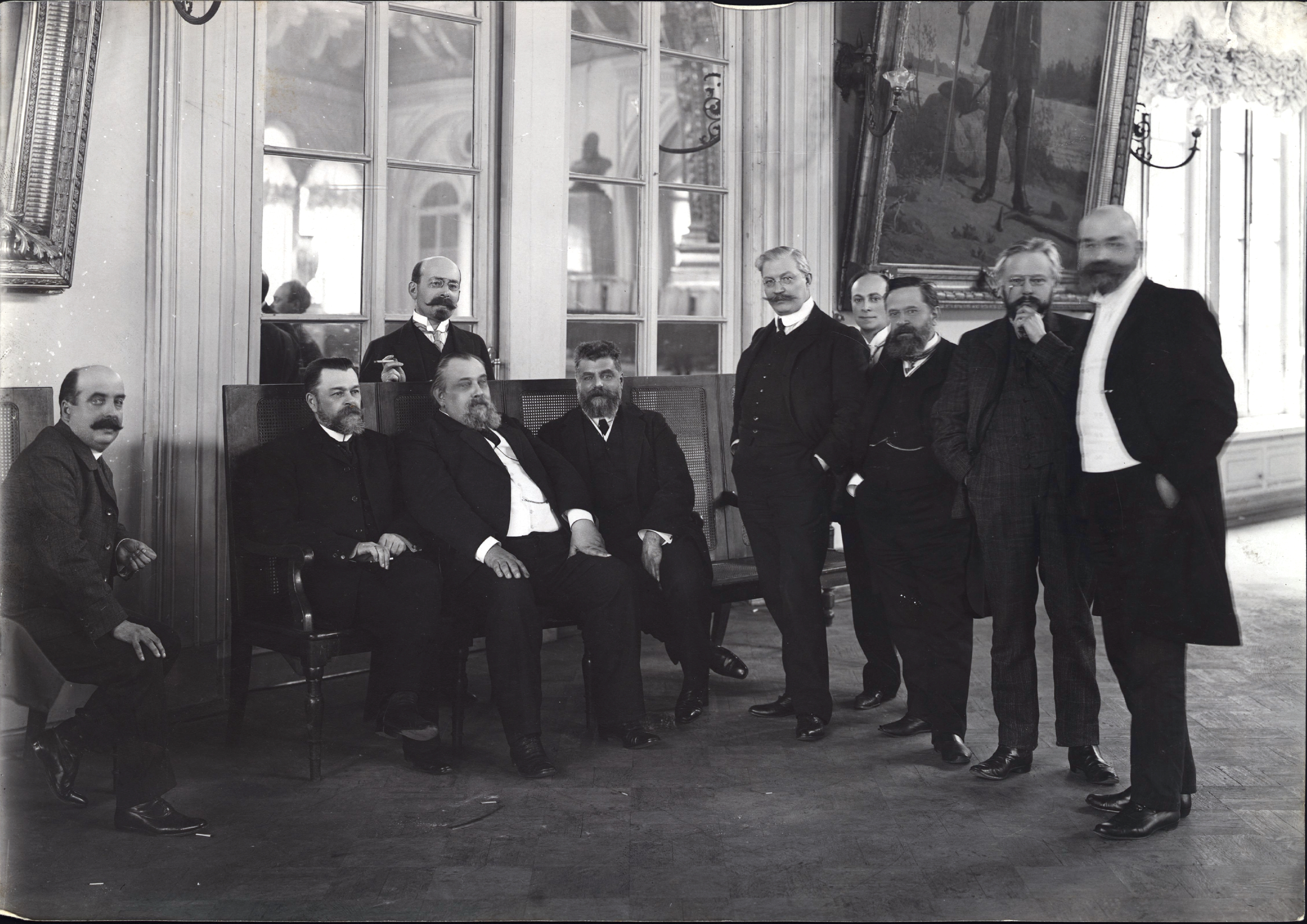
With deputats of the First Russian State Duma

Prior to the Russian Revolution of 1917, Kornilov was a history professor at the Polytechnicum of Peter the Great in Saint Petersburg and author of a definitive history of 19th century Russia. He specialized in the reign of Alexander II of Russia and the life of Mikhail Bakunin. In 1917, he served as secretary of the Central Committee of the liberal Constitutional Democratic Party and chairman of the party's Petrograd Committee.

After the Russian Civil War (1918–1920) Kornilov taught at the renamed Polytechnical Institute in Petrograd and continued his work on Bakunin.

== Works ==
=== In English ===
- Modern Russian History: Being an authoritative and detailed history of Russia from the Age of Catherine the Great to the Present, in 2 volumes, 679pp, trans. by Alexander S. Kaun, New York, Knopf, 1917. Reprinted as:
  - Modern Russian History: from the Age of Catherine the Great to the End of the 19th Century, Knopf, 1943, 1951, 1952, 1970
  - 19th Century Russia: From the Age of Napoleon to the Eve of Revolution, edited and abridged by Robert Bass, New York, Capricorn Books, 1966, 428pp

=== In Russian ===
- Krest'anskaya reforma. Saint Petersburg, Tipo-lit. F. Vaijsberga i P. Gershunina, 1905, 271p
- Krest'anskij stroj, 1905
- Ocherki po istorii obshchestvennago dvizheniya i krestyanskago dela v Rossii, Saint Petersburg, 1905, 473pp
- Obshchestvennoe dvizheniie pri Aleksandre II, 1855-1881: istoricheskie ocherki, Moscow, [Izd. zhurnala "Russkaya mysl'"], 1909, 263pp
- Molodye gody Mikhaila Bakunina: iz istorīi russkago romantizma, Moscow, Izd. M. i S. Sabashnikovykh, 1915, 718p
- Russkaya politika v Pol'she so vremeni razdelov do nachala XX veka: istoricheskij ocherk, Petrogad, Ogni, 1915, 93p
- Semejstvo Bakuninykh, [Moscow, Izd. M. i S. Sabashnikovykh, 1915], 2 volumes
- Kurs istorii Rossii devytnadtsatogo weka, in 3 volumes, 1918, reprinted in 1969
- Gody stranstvij Mikhaila Bakunina, Leningrad, Gos. izd-vo, 1925, 590p
