= Nikolay Gredeskul =

Russian liberal politician (1865–1941)

Nikolay Andreyevich Gredeskul
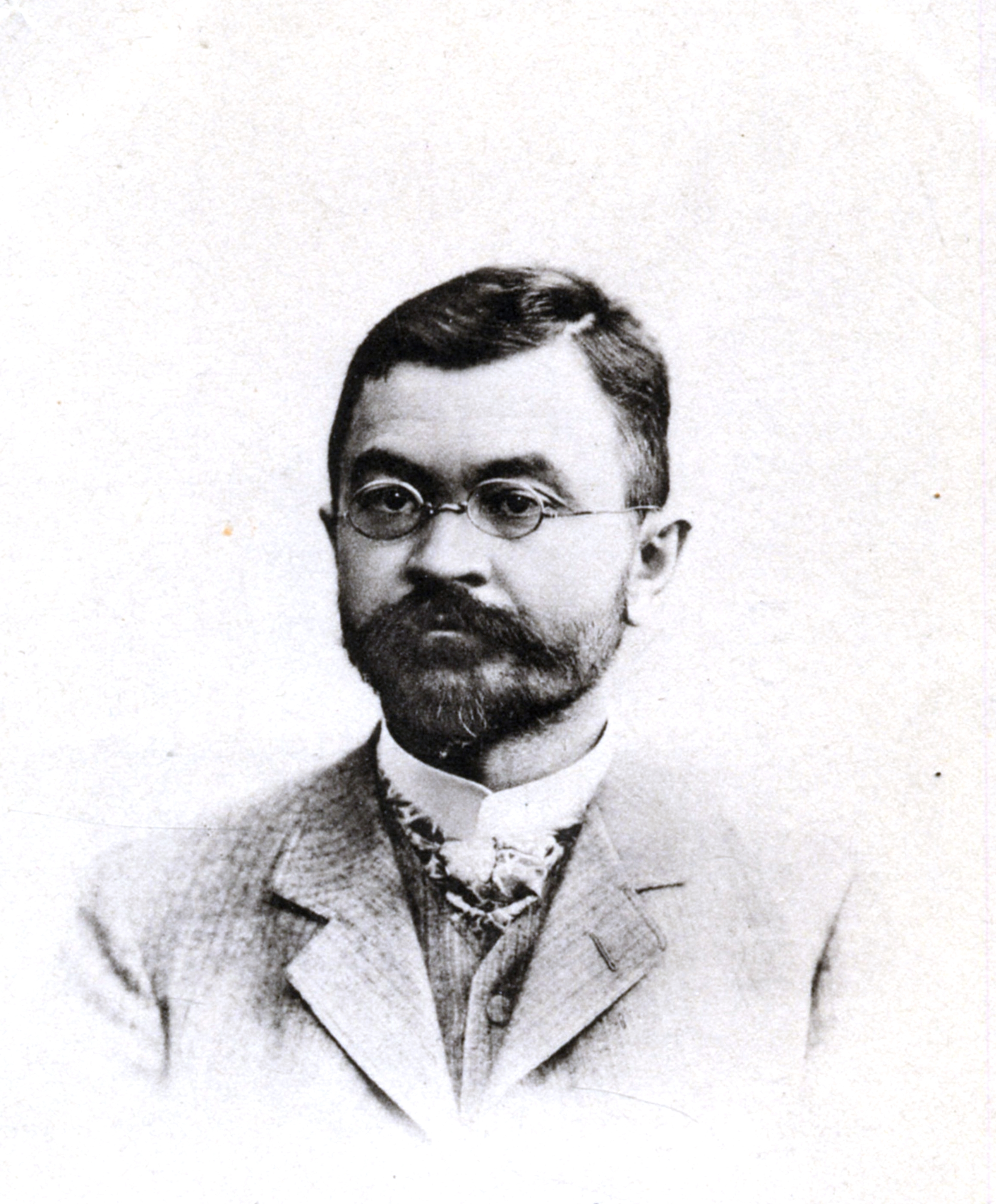
- Nikolay Gredeskul in 1906
- Born: 20 April 1865; Kupyansky Uyezd, Kharkov Governorate, Russian Empire
- Died: 8 September 1941 (aged 76); Leningrad, Soviet Union
- Occupation: Politician

Signature
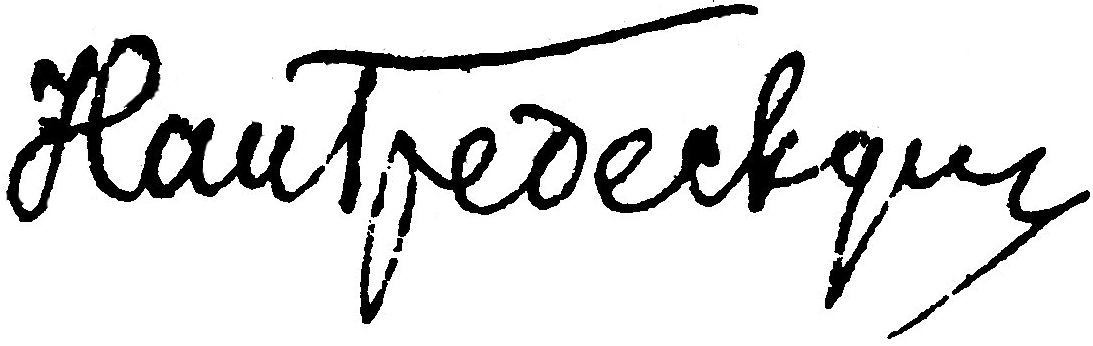

Nikolay Andreyevich Gredeskul (Ukrainian: Гредескул Микола Андрійович; Russian: Николай Андреевич Гредескул; 20 April 1865 – 8 September 1941) was a liberal politician from the Russian Empire.

== Biography ==
=== Origins ===
He was from an old noble family of Moldavian boyars, who emigrated to Russian Empire (Kharkiv region, today Ukraine) together with Dimitrie Cantemir.

=== Law professor ===
After graduating from the University of Kharkiv's law school, Gredeskul became a law professor (1890) and later dean of the law school there. In late 1904, with social tensions rising as Russian defeats in the Russo-Japanese War mounted, he joined other prominent Russian professors in calling for political reform and an academic union and was instrumental in founding the liberal Soyuz Osvobozhdeniya (Liberation League). Gredeskul admitted that the professoriat's traditional hostility to student protests, e.g. during the student unrest in 1899, may have been a mistake. With the easing of restrictions on independent press during the Russian Revolution of 1905, he founded and edited Mir, a liberal newspaper in Kharkiv.

=== Liberal politician ===
In October 1905, at the height of the revolution, Gredeskul became one of the founding members of the Constitutional Democratic party (aka the Kadet party) and a member of its Central Committee. In December 1905, after the suppression of the Moscow uprising, Gredeskul's paper was closed by the authorities, he was arrested and then exiled to the Arkhangelsk region. While in exile, he was elected to the First State Duma from the Kadets in February 1906, which ended his exile. He went to the capital, St. Petersburg, where he was elected Second Deputy Chairman of the Duma when it was convoked in April 1906. After the government dissolved the Duma on July 9, 1906, Gredeskul signed the Vyborg Manifesto, which called for passive resistance to the government. He was arrested, imprisoned for three months and barred from running in future Duma elections.

During the revolution, Gredeskul moved to St. Petersburg and became a professor of law at the St. Petersburg Polytechnical Institute. He coined the term "psychology of despair" to describe the psychology of the Russian society in the wake of the revolution's defeat. Considered one of the Kadets' leading theoreticians, Gredeskul defended radical traditions of the Russian intelligentsia against criticism from the Right by Vekhi authors in 1909. In late 1911, after the assassination of prime minister Pyotr Stolypin by Bogrov, a former secret police informer, Gredeskul argued that with the decline in revolutionary terrorism after 1907, the government should abandon its covert operations as well.

=== Nationalist evolution ===
Although at first Gredeskul was somewhat to the Left of the Constitutional Democratic party's center, after 1910 he moved to the Right and in 1912-1914 argued for an alliance with the Progressive faction and the Left wing of the Octobrists. In 1916, at the height of World War I, he published a pamphlet on the problem of ethnic minorities in Russia, which suggested that his views were evolving in the nationalist direction. In 1916 he began writing for Alexander Protopopov's Russkaya Volya (Russian Will), a nationalist newspaper, which led to Gredeskul's resignation from the Kadet Central Committee. Gredeskul edited Russkaya Volya between the February Revolution of 1917 and the October Revolution of 1917, when it was closed down by the new Bolshevik government.

=== After the 1917 Revolution ===
After the Bolshevik takeover, Gredeskul stayed in Soviet Russia and argued that Russian intellectuals should come to terms with the new government, which he saw as evolving in a more nationalist direction, anticipating Nikolay Ustryalov's ideas by a few months. In the summer of 1920, Bolshevik authorities arranged a speaking tour of the country for him.

In the 1920s, Grudeskul joined the Communist Party and was employed by the government as a university professor in Leningrad. He tried to combine Marx and Nietzsche in his book Russia, Before and Now (Rossiia prezhde i teper):

Superman, if one looks only at his internal meaning ... is a man of superior will and superior doubts ... in this internal meaning [the image of Superman] is glorious to a proletarian, not at all so to a bourgeois.

== Works ==
- "К учению об осуществлении права" (On the Theory of Law Implementation), Kharkov, 1900, 235 pp.
- "Социологическое изучение права" (Sociological Study of the Law), St. Petersburg, 1900, 13 pp.
- "Лекции по общей теории права" (Lectures on the General Theory of the Law), St. Petersburg, 1909, 317 pp.
- "Россия и её народы: Великая Россия как программа разрешения национального вопроса в России" (Russia and her Peoples: Great Russia as a Program to Solve the Nationalities Question in Russia), Petrograd, M. V. Popova, 1916, 79 pp.
- "Россия прежде и теперь" (Russia, Before and Now), [Leningrad?], 1926, 254 pp.

== Trivia ==
- Gredeskul's descendants are scattered around the world, including Russia, Ukraine, Israel, Australia, and USA. Foreign spelling of his surname varies from Gredeskul to Gredeskoul.
- It is believed by his relatives that he died during Siege of Leningrad in 1941.

== Notes ==
- See Mikhail Agursky. "Nietzschean Roots of Stalinist Culture", in Nietzsche and Soviet Culture: Ally and Adversary, ed. Bernice Glatzer Rosenthal, Cambridge University Press, 1994, ISBN 0-521-45281-3 p. 263.
- See Samuel Kassow. "University Professors", in Russia's Missing Middle Class: The Professions in Russian History, ed. Harley D. Balzer, M. E. Sharp, Inc., 1996, ISBN 1-56324-748-8 p. 206
- See Jeffrey Brooks. "Readers and Reading at the End of the Tsarist Era", in Literature and Society in Imperial Russia, 1800-1914, Stanford University Press, 1978, ISBN 0-8047-0961-0 p. 107
- See Jonathan Daly, "The Security Police", in Russia Under the Last Tsar, edited by Anna Geifman, Blackwell Publishers Ltd, 1999, ISBN 1-55786-995-2, pp. 231–232
- See Norman Stone. Europe Transformed, 2nd edition, Malden, MA, Blackwell, Publishers Ltd, 1999, ISBN 0-631-21377-5 p. 184
- See Melissa Stockdale. "The Constitutional Democratic Party", in Russia Under the Last Tsar, op. cit., pp. 168.
- N. A. Gredeskul. Rossiya i eyo narody: Velikaya Rossiya, kak programma razresheniya natsionalnogo voprosa v Rossii (Russia and her Peoples: Great Russia as a Program to Solve the Nationalities Question in Russia), Petrograd, M. V. Popova, 1916, 79pp.
- Gredeskul's wife divorced him in 1918 and took their daughters to Romania-controlled Bessarabia. One of his daughters, Lyudmila Gredeskul, returned to the Soviet Union in December 1930, but her university diploma wasn't recognized and she worked at a factory. She was arrested on July 5, 1941, sentenced to 10 years in the Soviet labor camps and died in a German offensive outside of Smolensk when prisoners were forced to dig trenches to stop German tanks.
- See John Gray. Post-Liberalism: Studies in Political Thought, New York, Routledge, 1993, ISBN 0-415-08873-9 (ISBN 0-415-13553-2 for the 1996 paperback edition), p. 177.
- See Bernice Glatzer Rosenthal. New Myth, New World: From Nietzsche to Stalinism, Pennsylvania State University, 2002, ISBN 0-271-02533-6, pp. 200–201
- See Mikhail Agursky. "Nietzschean Roots of Stalinist Culture", in Nietzsche and Soviet Culture: Ally and Adversary, op. cit., p. 263.
