= Gjuvara Noerieva =

Azerbaijani metallurgist (1912–1945)

- Born: 28 April 1912; Elizavetpol, Elizavetpol Governorate, Russian Empire
- Died: 30 April 1945 (aged 33); Leningrad, USSR
- Citizenship: Soviet Union
- Education: Leningrad Polytechnic Institute
- Occupation: Engineer - Metallurgist

Gjuvara Dzjachangir kizi Noerieva (28 April 1912 – 30 April 1945) was a Soviet metallurgical engineer, the first Azerbaijani woman to be a professional metallurgist, and the first Azerbaijani woman to work in the metallurgical industry.

She has an entry in the Azerbaijani Soviet Encyclopedia.

== Biography ==
=== Early life ===
Gjuvara Noerieva was born on 28 April 1912 in the city of Elizavetpol, Elizavetpol Governorate (now the city of Ganja in Azerbaijan) in the family of Dzjachangirkhana Noerieva, who was the son of Boyuk-beka Nuribekova and Rahshand-Sultan Khanum, who, in turn, was the daughter of the former Governor-General of Azerbaijan Bahman Mirza Qajar from his marriage, according to family legend, with the "Egyptian princess" Shahzadeh khanum.

=== Education ===
In 1935, Noerieva graduated from the Metallurgical Faculty of the Leningrad Polytechnic Institute.

=== Career ===
Subsequently, she worked at the Krasny Putilovets Plant in Leningrad (now the Kirov Plant), in the open-hearth shop. She held the positions of process engineer, master metallurgist, senior engineer, head of the shop, etc.

=== Accomplishments ===
During the Great Patriotic War, Gjuvara Noerieva participated in the development and application at the same plant of technology for welding special armored steel grades for tanks and anti-magnetic steel for submarines. She was also the organizer of the high-speed mode in metallurgical technology.

== Memoir ==
She died on 30 April 1945 at work. In 2016, the book by Georgy Zapletin “Gjuvara. Life is like a torch,” tells about the life of Gjuvara Noerieva.

== See also ==
- Azerbaijan
- Leningrad Polytechnic Institute
- Kirov Plant
