= Nikolai Dukhov =

Soviet engineer (1904–1964)

- Николай Духов
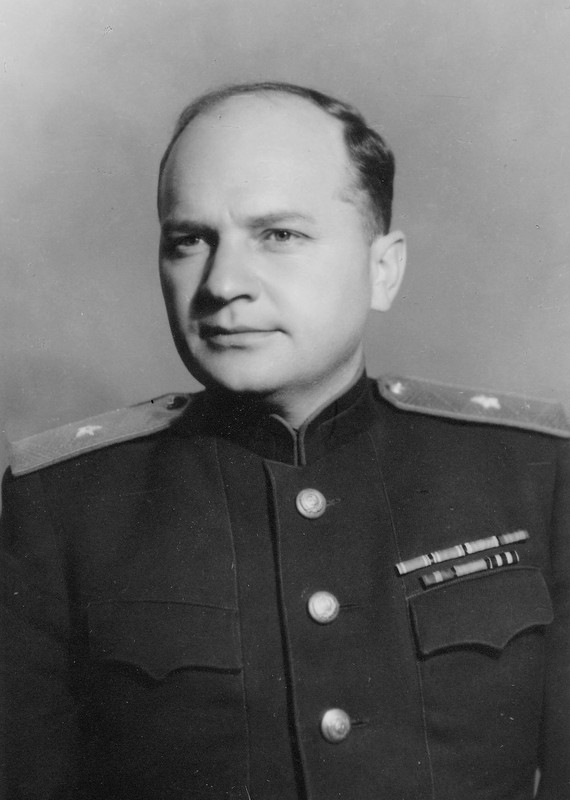
- Dukhov in 1945
- Born: Nikolai Leonidovich Dukhov; 8 November [O.S. 26 October] 1904; Vepryk, Gadyachsky Uyezd, Poltava Governorate, Russian Empire
- Died: May 1, 1964 (aged 59); Moscow, Soviet Union
- Education: Leningrad Polytechnic University
- Awards: Hero of Socialist Labour (3)

Nikolai Leonidovich Dukhov (Russian: Николай Леонидович Духов; 8 November [O.S. 26 October] 1904 – 1 May 1964) was a Soviet designer of cars, tractors, tanks and nuclear weapons.

== Biography ==
Dukhov was working in a tractor factory. In 1926, the factory Komsomol assembly sent him to study in an institute in Kharkiv, followed by a transfer without test to mechanical faculty in the Leningrad Polytechnical Institute to study engineer-design for tractors and cars. He was responsible for designing the Soviet tractors and heavy tanks in the 1930s.

In World War II he was the co-designer (along with Josef Kotin) of the Stalin heavy tank.

In 1948, he was nominated as the assistant to Yulii Khariton, the chief designer of the Soviet atomic bomb. He continued his work on nuclear projects until his death in 1964.

He taught in the Leningrad Road Institute and at mechanical faculty of the Leningrad Polytechnical Institute. He became a corresponding member of the Academy of Sciences of the Soviet Union (1953).

== Awards ==
- Thrice Hero of Socialist Labour
- Lenin Prize (1960)
- Stalin Prize second degree (1943)
- Stalin Prize first degree (1946, 1949, 1951, 1953)
- Four Orders of Lenin
- Order of Suvorov second degree
- Order of the Red Banner of Labour
- Order of the Red Star
