= Rech (newspaper) =

Rech (lit. 'Speech'; current Russian: Речь, originally: Рѣчь) was a Russian daily newspaper and the central organ of the Constitutional Democratic Party.

== History ==
Rech was published in St. Petersburg from February 1906 to October 1917. Julian Buck, an engineer and philanthropist, was the first editor. The newspaper was based in his house on Kirochnaya street, № 24, in apartment № 21. Its editorial office and printing house were located at Zhukovsky street, № 21. The editors were Iosif Gessen and Pavel Miliukov. It was a radical paper. Politically it supported approachment with Britain and France (e.g. welcomed the Anglo-Russian Convention). It was closed down by the Bolsheviks after the October Revolution 1917.
