= Sergey Sazonov =

Russian statesman and diplomat (1860–1927)

Sergei Sazonov GCB
- Сергей Сазонов
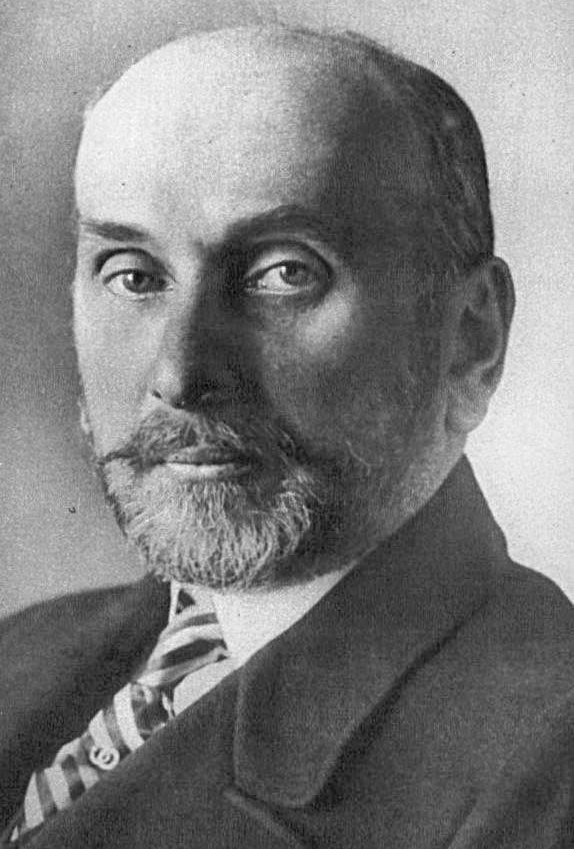
- Sergei Sazonov

Foreign Minister of Russia
- In office 11 October 1910 – 20 July 1916
- Monarch: Nicholas II
- Prime Minister: Pyotr Stolypin; Vladimir Kokovtsov; Ivan Goremykin; Boris Stürmer
- Preceded by: Alexander Izvolsky
- Succeeded by: Boris Stürmer

Personal details
- Born: 10 August 1860 Ryazan Governorate, Russia
- Died: 11 December 1927 (aged 67) Nice, France
- Spouse: Anna Borisovna von Neidhardt
- Education: Tsarskoye Selo Lyceum
- Profession: Diplomat, Russian foreign minister

Sergei Dmitriyevich Sazonov GCB (Russian: Серге́й Дми́триевич Сазо́нов; 10 August 1860 – 11 December 1927) was a Russian statesman and diplomat who served as the foreign minister of Russia from November 1910 to July 1916. The degree of his involvement in the events leading up to the outbreak of World War I is a matter of keen debate, with some historians putting the blame for an early and provocative mobilization squarely on Sazonov's shoulders, and others maintaining that his chief preoccupation was "to reduce the temperature of international relations, especially in the Balkans".

== Early career ==
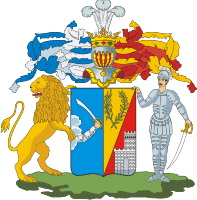
Arms of the Sazonov family

Born into the family of minor Russian nobility, tracing back their noble lineage back to the 17th century, he was the son of Dmitry Feodorovich Sazonov (1825–1860) and his wife, Baroness Yermioniya Alexandrovna Frederiks (Freedericksz). By marrying Anna Borisovna von Neidhardt (1868–1939), he became brother-in-law of Prime Minister Pyotr Stolypin, who did his best to further Sazonov's career.

Having graduated from the Tsarskoye Selo Lyceum, Sazonov served in the London embassy and the diplomatic mission to the Vatican, of which he became the chief in March 1906. On 26 June 1909, Sazonov was recalled to St. Petersburg and appointed Assistant Foreign Minister. Before long, he replaced Alexander Petrovich Izvolsky as Foreign Minister and followed a policy along the lines laid down by his brother-in-law Stolypin.

== Foreign minister ==
=== Potsdam Agreement ===
Just before he was officially appointed foreign minister, Sazonov attended a meeting between Nicholas II of Russia and Wilhelm II of Germany in Potsdam on 4–6 November 1910. This move was intended to chastise the British for their perceived betrayal of Russia's interests during the Bosnian Crisis. Indeed, Britain's Foreign Secretary, Sir Edward Grey, was seriously alarmed by this token of a "German-Russian Détente".

The two monarchs discussed the ambitious German project of the Baghdad Railway, widely expected to give Berlin considerable geopolitical clout in the Fertile Crescent. Against the background of the Persian Constitutional Revolution, Russia was anxious to control the prospective railway branch from Tehran to Khanaqin, on the Turco-Persian frontier, financed by Russian and German capital; and for Germany to link this branch to the Baghdad Railway. The two powers settled their differences in the Potsdam Agreement, signed on 19 August 1911, Germany giving Russia a free hand in Northern Iran and Russia in turn recognizing Germany's rights on the Baghdad Railway. Sazonov was sick during that time, his office was led by Anatoly Neratov during his absence. However, as Sazonov hoped, the first railway connecting Persia to Europe would provide Russia with a lever of influence over its southern neighbour.

Notwithstanding the promising beginning, the Russian-German relations disintegrated in 1913, when the Kaiser sent one of his generals to reorganize the Turkish army and to supervise the garrison in Constantinople on request of the Ottomans, remarking that "the German flag will soon fly over the fortifications of the Bosphorus", a vital trade artery which accounted for two fifths of Russia's exports.

=== Alliance with Japan ===
Despite his fixation on Russian-German affairs, Sazonov was also mindful of Russian interests in the Far East. In the wake of the disastrous Russo-Japanese War, he steadily made friendly overtures toward Japan. As a result, a secret convention was signed in St. Petersburg on 8 July 1912 concerning the delimitation of spheres of interest in Inner Mongolia. Both powers determined to keep Inner Mongolia politically separate from Outer Mongolia. Four years later, Sazonov congratulated himself on concluding a Russian-Japanese defensive alliance (3 July 1916) aimed at securing the interests of both powers in China.

=== World War I ===
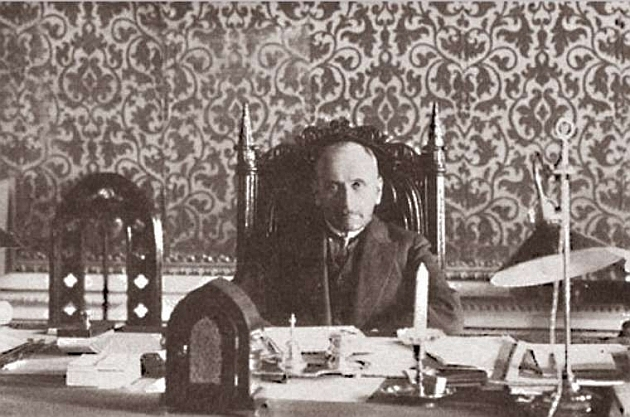
Sazonov as the Russian Foreign Minister

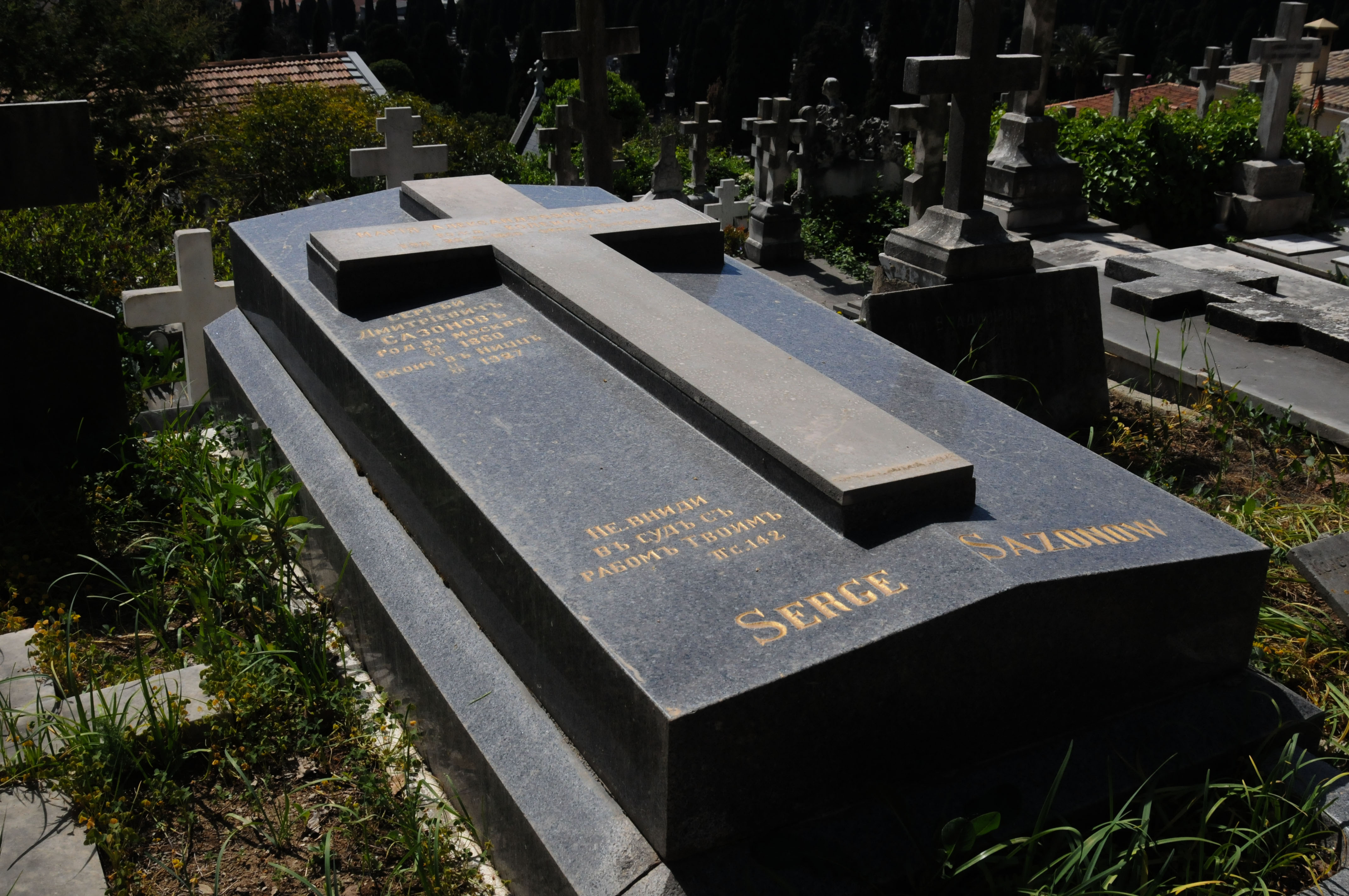
The grave of Sergey Sazonov

In the run-up to a major military conflict in Europe, another concern of the Russian minister was to isolate Austria-Hungary, mainly by playing the Balkan card against the supposedly-dwindling power of the Habsburgs. Since Sazonov was moderate in his Balkan politics, his ministry "came under frequent nationalist fire for failing to conform to a rigid pan-Slav line".

While extremist agents like Nicholas Hartwig aspired to solidify the conflicting South Slavic states into a confederacy under the aegis of the Tsar, there is no indication that Sazonov personally shared or encouraged these views. Regardless, both Austria-Hungary and Germany were persuaded that Russia fomented Pan-Slavism in Belgrade and other Slavic capitals, a belligerent attitude in some measure responsible for the Assassination in Sarajevo and the outbreak of the Great War.

Serbia was largely viewed as being within Russia's sphere of influence and there was significant support from the Russian political classes and the broader population for the Serbian cause. That caused Russia to defend Serbia against Austria-Hungary after the assassination of the Austrian Archduke Franz Ferdinand. Sazonov warned Austria-Hungary in 1914 that Russia, "would respond militarily to any action against the client state."

As World War I began, Sazonov worked to prevent Romania from joining the Central Powers and wrested in March 1915 an acquiescence from Russia's allies to the post-war occupation of the Bosphorus, Constantinople, and the European side of the Dardanelles. On 1 October 1914 Sazonov gave a written guarantee to Romania that, if the country sided with the Entente, it would be enlarged at the expense of the Austro-Hungarian dominions in Transylvania, Bukovina, and the Banat. In general, "his calm and courteous manner did much to maintain fruitful Allied relations".

He accepted a request from the professor Tomáš Masaryk for Russian army soldiers to refrain from firing on Czech refugees in October 1914.

Sazonov was viewed favourably in London, but the Germanophile faction of Tsarina Alexandra fiercely urged his dismissal, which did materialize on 10 July 1916 after the minister had aired a proposal to grant autonomy to Poland.

== Later life ==
Early in 1917, Sazonov was appointed ambassador to Great Britain, but found it necessary to remain in Russia, where he witnessed the February Revolution.

He was opposed to Bolshevism, advised Anton Denikin on international affairs, and was foreign minister in the anti-Bolshevik government of Admiral Kolchak. In 1919 he represented the Provisional All-Russian Government, the Allied recognized government of Russia, at the Paris Peace Conference. Sazonov spent his last years in France writing a book of memoirs. He died in Nice in 1927.

== Popular culture depictions ==
- Sazonov was portrayed by Michael Redgrave in the film Nicholas and Alexandra (1971).

== See also ==
- Russian entry into World War I

== Works ==
- Fateful Years 1909-1916 (1928)

Political offices
Preceded by Alexander Izvolski	Foreign Minister of Russia; September 1910 – 10 July 1916 (O.S.)	Succeeded by Boris Stürmer
