= Svobodni Narod =

Bulgarian-language Israeli newspaper

Svobodni Narod (Bulgarian: Свободни народ, A Free People) was a Bulgarian-language weekly newspaper published in Tel-Aviv. Svobodni Narod was an organ of Mapai. In the early 1960s, the editor of the newspaper was H. Assa. Y. Navon was the administrative manager of the newspaper.
