= Peter the Great St. Petersburg Polytechnic University =

Technical university in Saint Petersburg, Russia

Coordinates: 60°00′26.41″N 30°22′22.66″E

Peter the Great St.Petersburg Polytechnic University
- Санкт-Петербургский политехнический университет Петра Великого
- Former name: Saint Petersburg State Technical University
- Type: Public / National research university
- Established: 1899
- Endowment: US $298 million
- President: Mikhail P. Fedorov
- Rector: Andrey I. Rudskoy
- Faculty: 3291
- Administrative staff: 1,940
- Students: 32,250
- Location: Polytechnicheskaya 29, 195251, St. Petersburg, Russia
- Campus: Urban, city center, 102 hectares
- Colours: Green/Golden
- Nickname: Polytech
- Mascot: Two-Headed Eagle
- Website: www.spbstu.ru

University rankings

Regional – Overall
- QS Emerging Europe and Central Asia: 46 (2022)

Peter the Great St. Petersburg Polytechnic University (Russian: Санкт-Петербургский политехнический университет Петра Великого, romanized: Sankt-Peterburgskiy politekhnicheskiy universitet Petra Velikogo), abbreviated as SPbPU (СПбПУ), is a public technical university located in Saint Petersburg, Russia. The university houses one of the country's most advanced research labs in hydro–aerodynamics. The university's alumni include Nobel Prize winners, such as Pyotr Kapitsa and Zhores Alferov, physicists and atomic weapon designers such as Yulii Khariton, Nikolay Dukhov, Abram Ioffe, Aleksandr Leipunskii, and Yakov Zeldovich, aircraft designers and aerospace engineers, such as Yulii Khariton, Oleg Antonov, Nikolai Polikarpov, and Georgy Beriev, and chess grandmasters, such as David Bronstein. The university offers academic programs at the Bachelor, Master's, and Doctorate degree levels. SPbPU consists of structural units called Institutes divided into three categories: Engineering Institutes, Physical Institutes, and Economics and Humanities Institutes. In 2022, the university was ranked #301 in the world in the Times Higher Education (THE) World University Rankings, #393 in QS World University Rankings, #679 in Best Global Universities Rankings by U.S. News & World Report, and #1,005 by Center for World University Rankings.

== History ==
=== Imperial Russia ===
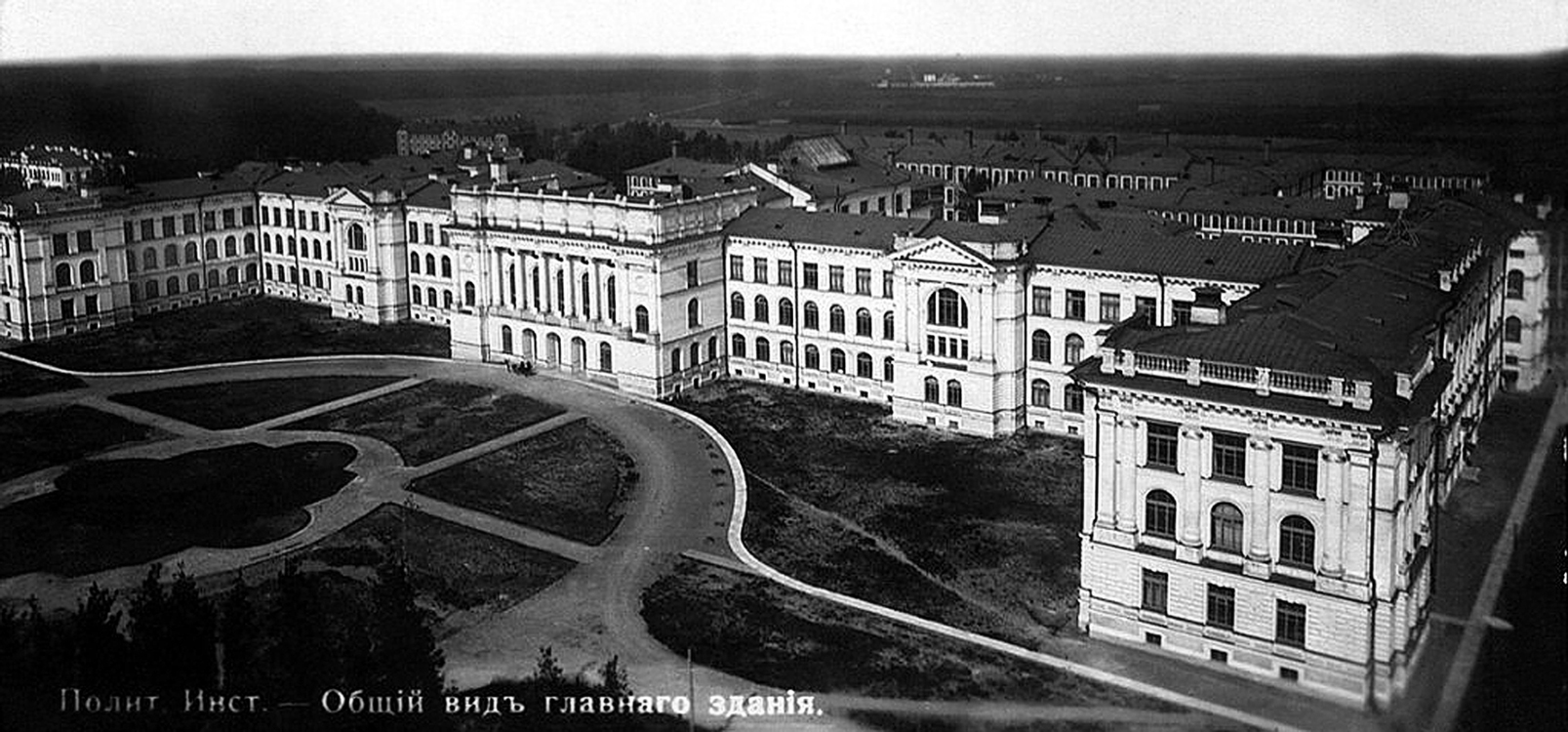
Main Building, 1902

Saint Petersburg Polytechnic Institute was founded in 1899 as an engineering school in Russia. The main person promoting the creation of this university was the Finance Minister Count Sergei Witte. Witte viewed establishing an engineering school loosely modeled by the French École Polytechnique as an important step towards the industrialization of Russia.

The first director of the institute became Prince Andrey Gagarin. Unlike the French École Polytechnique, the Saint Petersburg Polytechnic Institute was always considered to be a civilian establishment. In tsarist Russia it was subordinated to the Ministry of Finance; its students and faculty wore the uniform of the ministry.

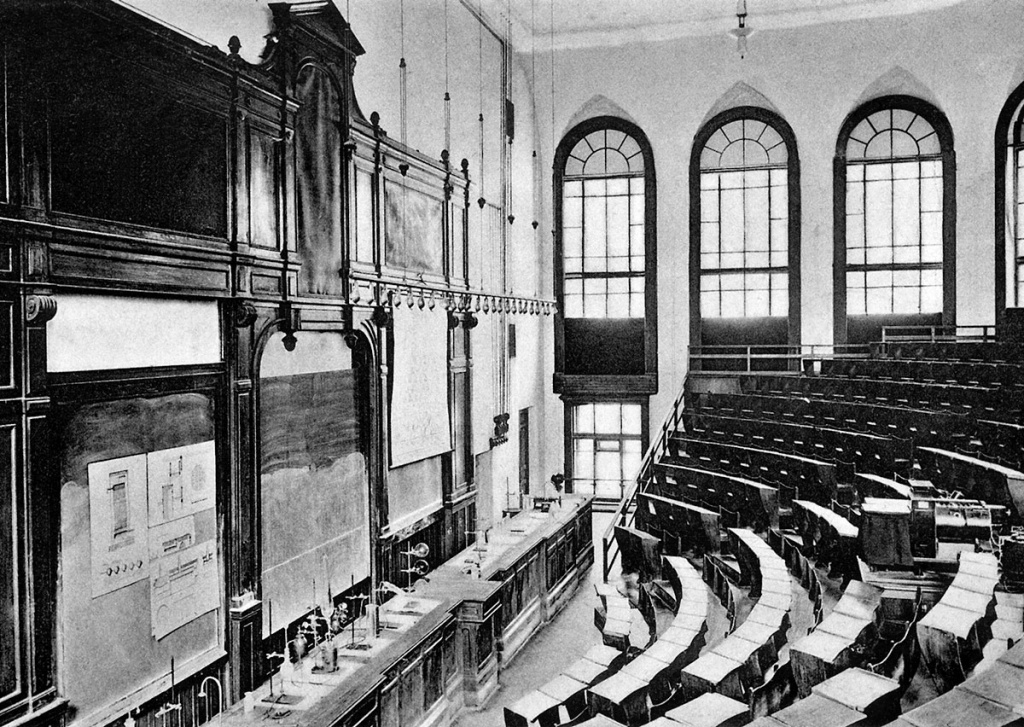
An auditorium of the new institute, 1902

The main campus was built on the rural lands beyond the dacha settlement Lesnoye. The location was intended to provide some separation between the campus and the capital city of Saint Petersburg. The institute was opened to students on October 1, 1902. Originally there were four departments: Economics, Shipbuilding, Electro-mechanics and Metallurgy.

Its work was interrupted by the Russian Revolution of 1905. One student, M. Savinkov, was killed during the Bloody Sunday events of 22 January [O.S. 9 January] 1905. The reaction of the student body was so strong that classes only resumed in September 1906, almost two years later. Among the polytechnic students who participated in the Revolutionary events were the future Bolshevik leader Mikhail Frunze and the future writer Yevgeny Zamyatin. Among the deputies of the First Duma were four Polytechnic Institute's faculties: N.A. Gredeskul (Н.А. Гредескул), N.I. Kareev (Н.И. Кареев), A.S. Lomshakov (А.С. Ломшаков) and L.N. Yasnopolsky (Л.Н. Яснопольский). In 1910 the institute was named Peter the Great Polytechnic Institute after Peter I of Russia. In 1914 the number of students reached 6,000.

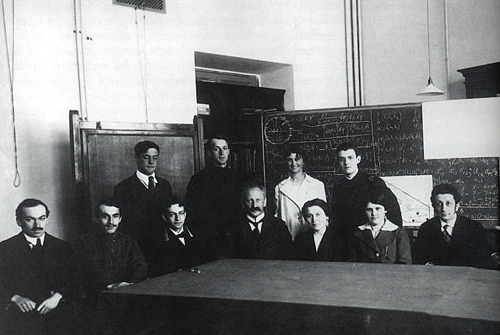
Ioffe's physics seminar at the Polytechnic Institute, among the people in the picture: Yakov Frenkel sits first on the left, next to him Nikolay Semyonov, Abram Ioffe sits in the center, Pyotr Kapitsa is on the left

With the onset of World War I many students found themselves in the Army and soon the number of students decreased to 3,000. Some students, like future Soviet military commander Leonid Govorov studied at the institute for one month. Part of the institute's buildings were transferred into the Maria Fyodorovna Hospital. Despite the war the institute did not stop its work.

In 1916 Abram Ioffe opened his Physics Seminar at the Polytechnic Institute. The seminar prepared three Nobel Prize-winners and many other prominent Russian physicists. Eventually, this seminar became the core of the Ioffe Physico-Technical Institute.

=== Revolution ===
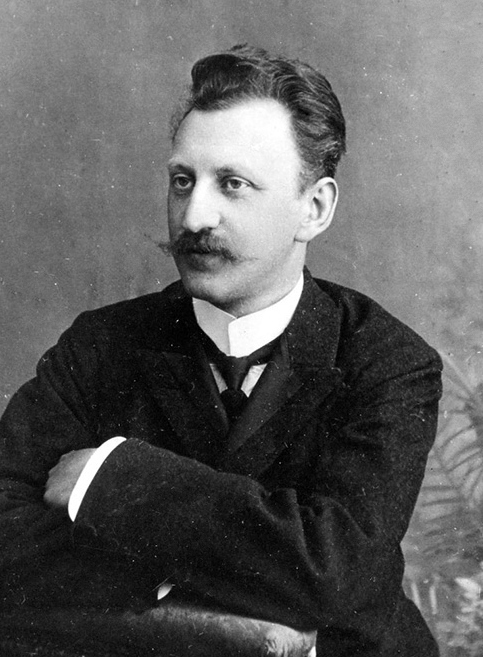
Stalin Prize and Lenin Prize awardee Abram Ioffe

On June 5, 1918 the institute was renamed to First Polytechnic Institute (with the Second Polytechnic Institute being the former Women's Polytechnic Institute). In November 1918 Sovnarkom abolished all forms of scientific decrees, licenses and certifications. There remained only two positions for the faculty: Professor (that required three years of engineering experience) and instructor (with no formal requirements at all). Departments were renamed Faculties (факультеты), and the director became rector. A Soviet (Council) of 11 professors and 15 students was given the main authority in the Institute. One of these 15 students in the Soviet was Pyotr Kapitsa, a future Nobel-Prize winner in physics. The Faculty of Physics and Mechanics, headed at that time by Abram Ioffe, focused on atomic and the solid state physics.

In winter of 1918/1919 there were food shortages and no heating on campus due to fuel shortages; many students and faculty members died of starvation and freezing temperatures. In the beginning 1919 there were only around 500 students at the university. In August 1919 the new semester started but on August 24 all the students were mobilized to fight Yudenich army. The Institute itself was encircled by stanchions and barbed wire and transformed into a Red Army fortification. After December 1919 the Institute was completely empty.

=== Soviet era ===
The Institute started working again in April 1920 when it became a part of the planning team for the GOELRO plan. Professor of the Institute, A. V. Wulf was the chairman of the group working on the electrification of the Northern Region of RSFSR. The Institute developed projects of the Volkhov hydroelectric dam on the Volkhov River and the Dnieper Hydroelectric Station on the Dnieper River. In autumn 1920, due to the cold weather and the absence of heating some lectures were only attended by one or two students. At that difficult time Nikolay Semyonov and Pyotr Kapitsa discovered a way to measure the magnetic field of an atomic nucleus. Later the experimental setup was improved by Otto Stern and Walther Gerlach and became known as Stern–Gerlach experiment. In another laboratory another student of the Institute, Léon Theremin worked on the development of electronic musical instruments. His first demonstration of the theremin was held in Polytechnic Institute in November 1920.

After the end of the Russian Civil War many students returned to the Institute. By the spring of 1922 there were 2800 students on the campus. In 1926, Sovnarkom re-established the title Engineer and allowed "children of working intelligentsia" to enter the tertiary schools; prior to this only workers and children of workers were allowed. The number of students enrolled at the Polytechnic Institute reached the 1914 level of 6,000. By 1928 there were 8,000 students.

In 1930, Sovnarkom decided to create a network of highly specialized Engineering schools. On June 30 Polytechnic Institute was closed and a number of independent institutes were created instead:

- Hydrotechnical (Гидротехнический),
- Industrial Civil Engineering (Институт инженеров промышленного строительства), now the Military engineering-technical university (Военный инженерно-технический универ.),
- Shipbuilding (Кораблестроительный),
- Aviation (Авиационный),
- Electrotechnical (Электротехнический),
- Chemical Technology (Химико-технологический),
- Metallurgy (Металлургический),
- Machine Building (Машиностроительный),
- Industrial Agriculture (Индустриального сельского хозяйства),
- Physics and mechanics (Физико-механического),
- Finances and Economics (Финансово-экономический) and
- Boilers and Turbines (Всесоюзный котлотурбинный).

Soon another Institute of Military Mechanics forked from the Machine Building Institute.

In April 1934, most of these institutes were merged back into the Leningrad Industrial Institute. In November 1940, the Institute almost got its original name back. Now it was named the Kalinin Politechnical Institute (Leningradskij Politekhnicheskij Institut imeni Kalinina) after the President of the Presidium of the Supreme Soviet Mikhail Kalinin.

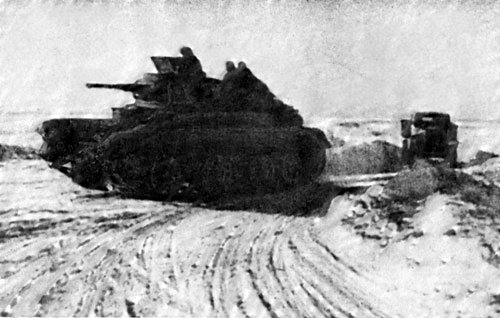
Study of the Ice Strength on the Road of Life by the Polytechnic Institute

With the onset of the eastern front of World War II, 3500 students went to the army and hundreds were involved in constructing fortifications to the university itself. The main building was transformed into a hospital and another building was used as a tank school. Institute shops filled military contracts. On September 8, 1941 the Siege of Leningrad began. Research on the strength of ice by employees S. S. Golushkevich, P. P. Kobeko, N. M. Reyman and A. R. Shulman proved the feasibility of transporting vital materials across ice. The researchers selected the safest route for the Road of Life - the transport route across the frozen Lake Ladoga, which provided the only access to the besieged city. Some faculties and students were evacuated to Tashkent in January 1943 where they were able to hold classes. In November 1943 they restarted classes in Leningrad as well. In 1943 in Leningrad there were 250 students and 90 teachers at the Institute. The Polytechnic Institute was the only school in the besieged city that had the authority to evaluate the Kandidat (Ph.D) and Doctor of Science dissertations. Before the end of the siege the Polytechnic Institute evaluated 19 dissertations, many related to military defense.

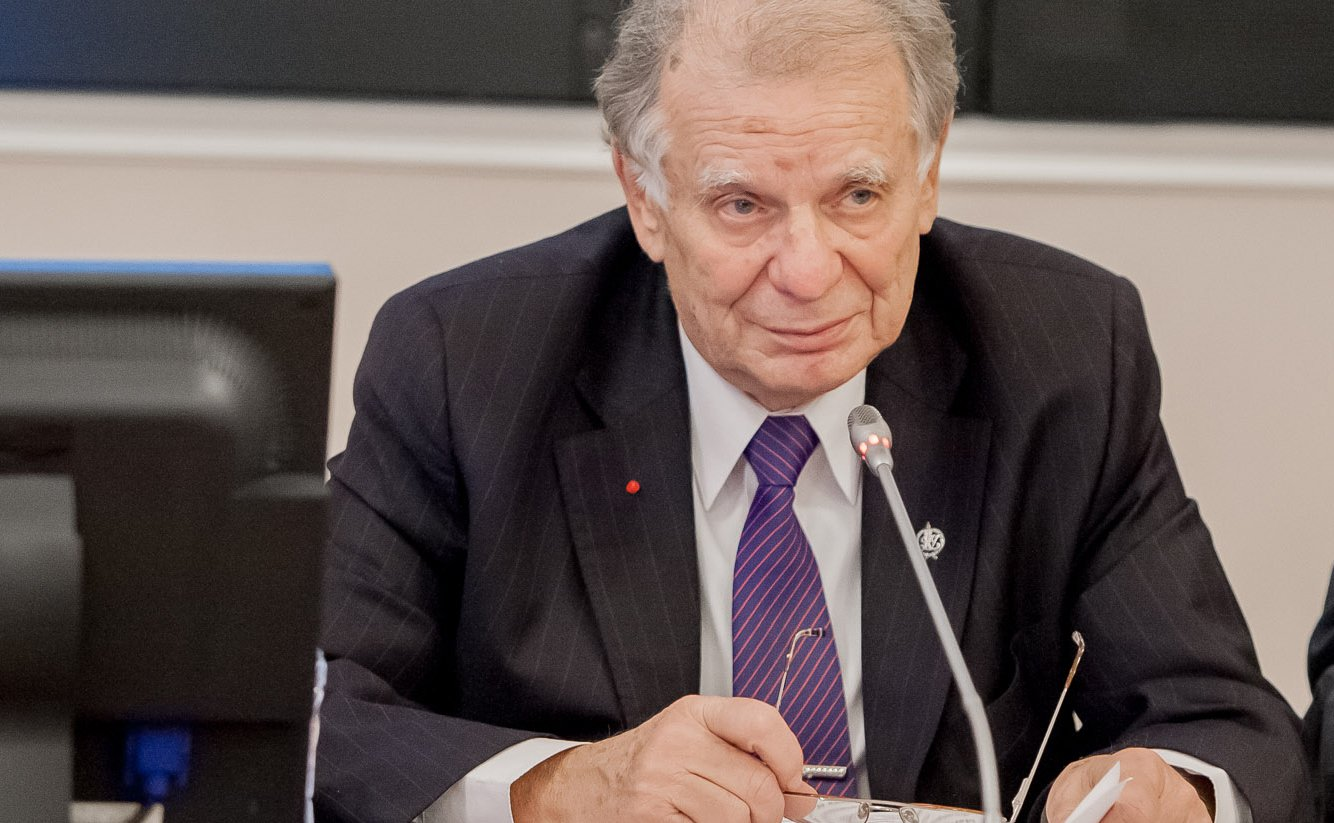
Nobel Prize winner Zhores Alfyorov

In 1952, Radio-physics Department was created. In 1988, the new Physics-Technical (Fiziko-Tekhnichesky) Department (faculty) of the Institute was created. The department was modeled on the Ioffe Physico-Technical Institute and headed by the director of the Ioffe Institute Zhores Ivanovich Alferov, recipient of the 2000 Nobel Prize in physics.

== Current status ==
In September 1991 Leningrad returned its historical name Saint Petersburg and the Institute was renamed St. Petersburg State Technical University (the word "Technical" was changed to "Polytechnic" in 2002). Finally, in 2015, the institute took its current name Peter the Great St. Petersburg Polytechnic University.

During the 2022 Russian invasion of Ukraine, the University issued a public statement strongly supporting Russian actions, calling the assault a "denazification operation" and accusing Ukrainian leadership of endangering the security and existence of Russia and "all of humanity". According to Andrey Rudskoy, head of the university, while scientific cooperation with Western universities had been developed over decades, after the invasion it was almost completely destroyed, with foreign universities halting their ties with the university.

== World ranking ==
- 2022: #301 in the world in the Times Higher Education (THE) World University Rankings, #393 in QS World University Rankings, #679 in Best Global Universities Rankings by U.S. News & World Report (in 2023), and #1,005 by Center for World University Rankings.

== Students ==
More than 30,000 students are enrolled in the university. International students countries of origin include US, UK, France, Germany, Finland, Sweden and most of the CIS state members.

=== Department enrollment ===
Proportion of student body enrolled in each department, where enrollment exceeds 10%:

- Economics and Management – 23%
- Energy, Power engineering and Electrical engineering – 17%
- Metallurgy, Machinery and Materials processing – 10%

== Campus ==
The campus consists of

- Buildings – 112; Students dormitories – 15 buildings
- Students – 30,197 (including 2,916 foreign students)
- Teaching staff – 3,300; University staff – 5,274

=== Structural units ===
Today the Polytechnic University includes 6 associated institutes outside Saint Petersburg in the cities of Pskov, Cheboksary, Cherepovets, Sosnovy Bor, Smolensk and Anadyr.

- 21 faculties and institutes
- Over 150 departments, 120 R&E laboratories, 26 research and educational centers
- 3 branches and 6 representatives
- St. Petersburg College of Information and Management

== Alumni and faculty ==
The university has graduated over 150,000 students. Notable alumni and faculty include:

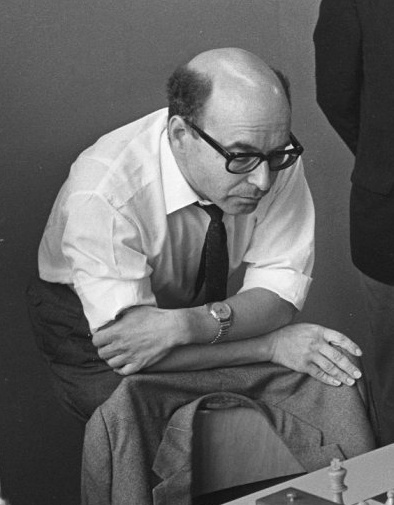
David Bronstein

- Nobel Prize winners Pyotr Kapitsa, Nikolay Semyonov, and Zhores Alferov
- Academicians Igor Kurchatov, Anatoly Liberman, and Georgy Flyorov
- Physicists Abram Ioffe, Aleksandr Leipunskii, Jadwiga Szmidt, and Yakov Zeldovich
- Nuclear weapon designers Yulii Khariton and Nikolay Dukhov
- Aircraft designers Yulii Khariton, Oleg Antonov, Nikolai Polikarpov and Georgy Beriev
- T-34 tank designer Mikhail Koshkin
- Navy Admiral Aksel Berg
- Chess grandmasters David Bronstein and Russian-Israeli Dina Belenkaya
- Writers Boris Gavrilovich Gavrilov, Daniil Granin, and Yevgeny Zamyatin
- US journalist Matt Taibbi
- Theology lecturer Grigory Spiridonovich Petrov
- Former president of the Russian Academy of Sciences Anatoly Alexandrov
- Former Turkmenistan president Saparmurat Niyazov
- First cosmonaut Yuri Gagarin
- First female Azerbaijani professional metallurgist, Gjuvara Noerieva
- Ice hockey executive Latvian Kirovs Lipmans

== Official names ==
The university has undergone several name changes throughout its existence. Detailed list of name changes is as following:

- 1899–1910 – Saint Petersburg Polytechnic Institute (Санкт-Петербургский политехнический институт)
- 1910–1914 – Saint Petersburg Peter the Great Polytechnic Institute (Санкт-Петербургский политехнический институт императора Петра Великого)
- 1914–1922 – Petrograd Peter the Great Polytechnic Institute (Петроградский политехнический институт императора Петра Великого)
- 1922–1923 – First Petrograd Polytechnic Institute (Первый Петроградский политехнический институт)
- 1923–1924 – Petrograd Polytechnic Institute (Петроградский политехнический институт)
- 1924–1930 – Leningrad Polytechnic Institute (Ленинградский политехнический институт)
- 1930–1934 – Divided into various colleges and branches under a variety of names.
- 1934–1940 – Leningrad Industrial Institute (Ленинградский индустриальный институт)
- 1940–1990 – Leningrad Polytechnic Institute (Ленинградский политехнический институт)
- 1990–1991 – Leningrad State Technical University (Ленинградский государственный технический университет)
- 1991–2002 – Saint-Petersburg State Technical University (Санкт-Петербургский государственный технический университет)
- 2002–2015 – Saint Petersburg State Polytechnic University (Санкт-Петербургский государственный политехнический университет)
- Since 2015 – Peter the Great St. Petersburg Polytechnic University (Санкт-Петербургский политехнический университет Петра Великого)
