= Union of Unions =

The Union of Unions (Russian: Союз союзов, Soyuz soyuzov) was a wide alliance of various professional unions formed in 1905, active during the revolutionary last years of the Russian Empire. One of those active in the formation of the Union of Unions was Pavel Milyukov, who later became the Foreign Minister in 1917.

It was formed in the wake of Bloody Sunday, as the professional associations organized themselves at national level, to rally their members behind the liberal cause. The Union of Writers, Lawyers, Professors and Engineers were one of the first of these unions to be formed. They were soon joined by the Women's Union for Equality, despite some opposition from male leaders of the Union of Unions.Semi-professional associations, like the Union of Railway Workers and Employees, Union of Clerks and Book-keepers, and the Union of Pharmaceutical Assistants, became organized as affiliated associations. Their participation gave the intelligentsia a direct link with the masses, whom they had been distanced from.

After the founding of the Bulygin Duma in 1905, the radicals in the Union of Unions, alongside the Social Democrats, became more determined than ever to use "mass civil disobedience" as a weapon to pressurize the government to make further reforms and concessions, even though liberals chose not to boycott the elections to the Duma.

During the general strike in September 1905, after the most educated and wealthy of the working class – the printers – had gone on strike, the railway workers, and the Union of Railway Employees and Workers, followed suit. The union was affiliated with the Union of Unions, which themselves at the time had been discussing the possibility of a political general strike to aid their campaign for further reform for several months. The political demands of the demonstrators was "remarkably uniform", which was a sign of the co-ordinating role that the Union of Unions played.

The Union of Unions served partly as the origin of the Petersburg Soviet, as they first came up with the idea of a workers council established to orchestrate general strikes.

== Bibliography ==
- Figes, Orlando. A People's Tragedy: The Russian Revolution 1891–1924. London: The Bodley Head. ISBN 9781847922915.
