= Ivan Zalkind =

Soviet diplomat (1845–19975)

Ivan Abramovich Zalkind (Russian: Иван Абрамович Залкинд; 1 May 1885 in Saint Petersburg, Russia – 27 November 1928 in Leningrad, Soviet Union), also known as Ivan Artamonov (Russian: Иван Артамонов), was a Jewish Soviet diplomat.

== Career and death ==
Originally a biologist who earned his doctorate from the Sorbonne in Paris, Zalkind took part in the 1917 October Revolution on the side of Leon Trotsky. When Trotsky became the People's Commissar for Foreign Affairs (de facto: Soviet foreign minister), he made Zalkind his first deputy (de facto: Permanent Under Secretary of State or Deputy Minister of Foreign Affairs).

When Trotsky resigned as foreign minister (because of the 1918 peace Treaty of Brest-Litovsk), Zalkind was sent as plenipotentiary and consul to Switzerland (Zürich, 1918), Turkey (Istanbul, 1922), Latvia (Liepāja, 1923) and Italy (Genoa, 1924, and Milan, 1925).

Back in the Soviet Union, after Trotsky's downfall, Zalkind was expelled from the Communist party and shot himself.
