= Nikolai Ivanovich Kareev =

Russian sociologist (1850–1931)

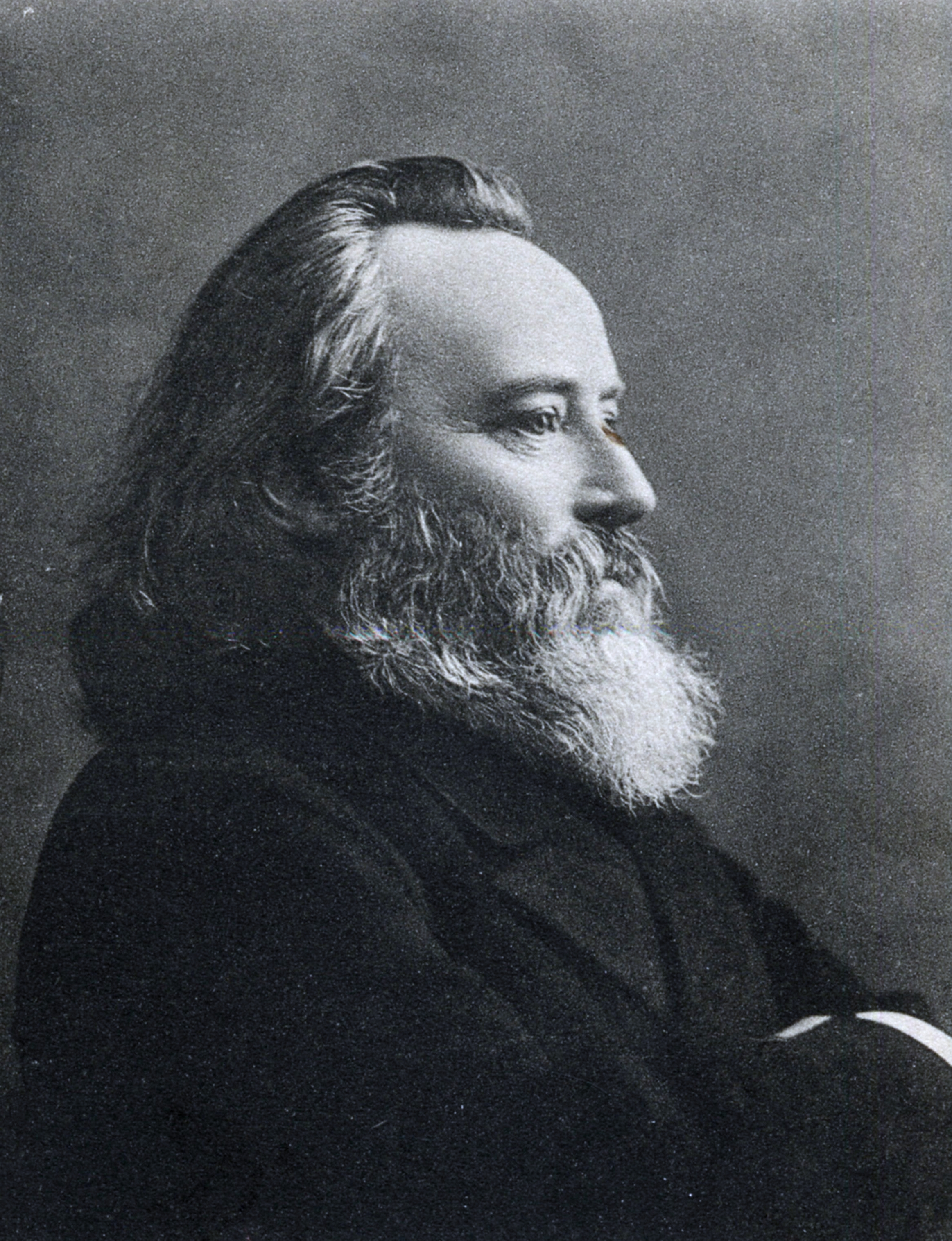
N.I. Kareev.

Signature

Nikolai Ivanovich Kareev (Russian: Никола́й Ива́нович Каре́ев; 6 December 1850 – 18 February 1931) was a historian and philosopher from the Russian Empire and later the Soviet Union. He was educated at Moscow and earned his doctorate in history in 1884.

== Life ==
Like many other intellectuals in Russia, Kareev was deeply influenced by the liberal, progressive, constitutional, and Socialist movements developing in Russia in the late nineteenth century. Peter Kropotkin, the Russian Anarchist, describes him as one of the few who correctly understood the French Revolution, because he had studied "movements preceding the revolution of July 14".

== Works ==
- Философия культурной и социальной истории нового времени (Filosofiia kulturnoi i sotsialnoi istorii novago vremeni, 1893)
- История Западной Европы в начале XX века (Istorii͡a Zapadnoi Evropy v nat͡schalie XX vieka / Moskva : izd.otdel Moskovskago nauchnago ins-ta, 1920)
- Историология (Istoriologiia, 1915)
