= Petrograd Metropolis electoral district =

Russian constituency created in 1917

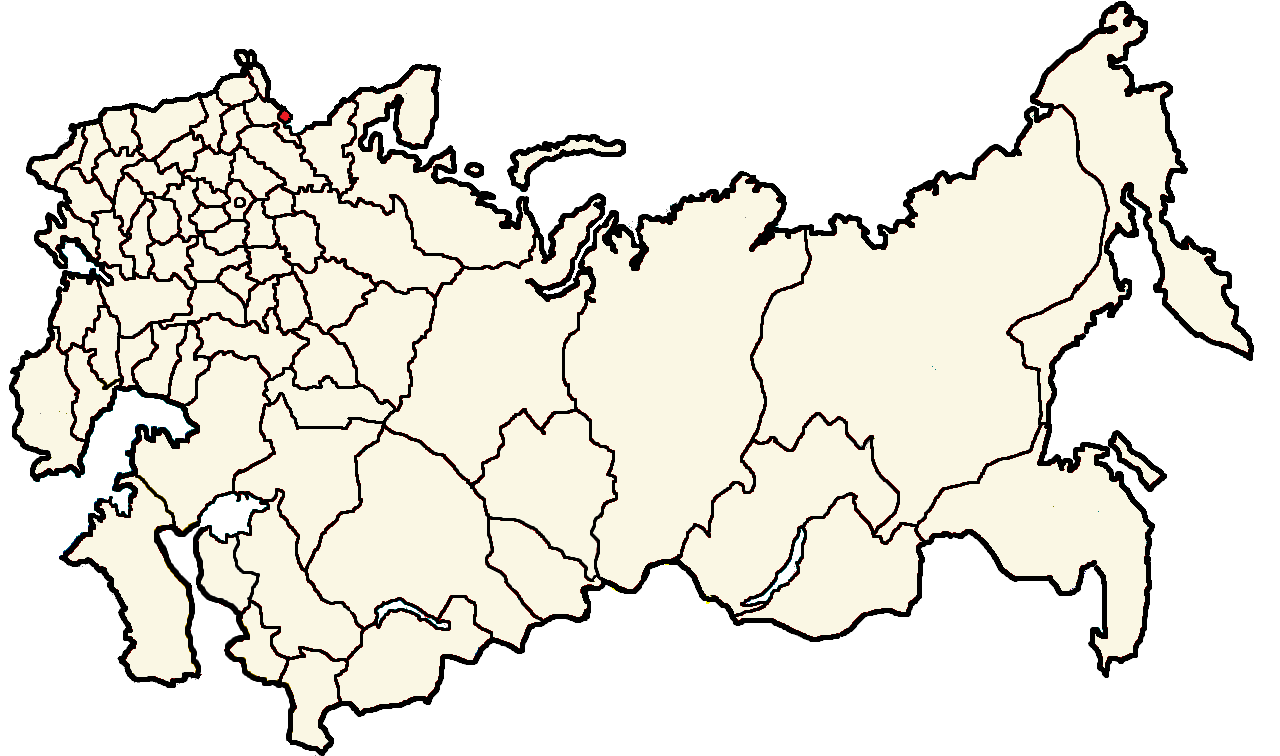
Petrograd Metropolis electoral district

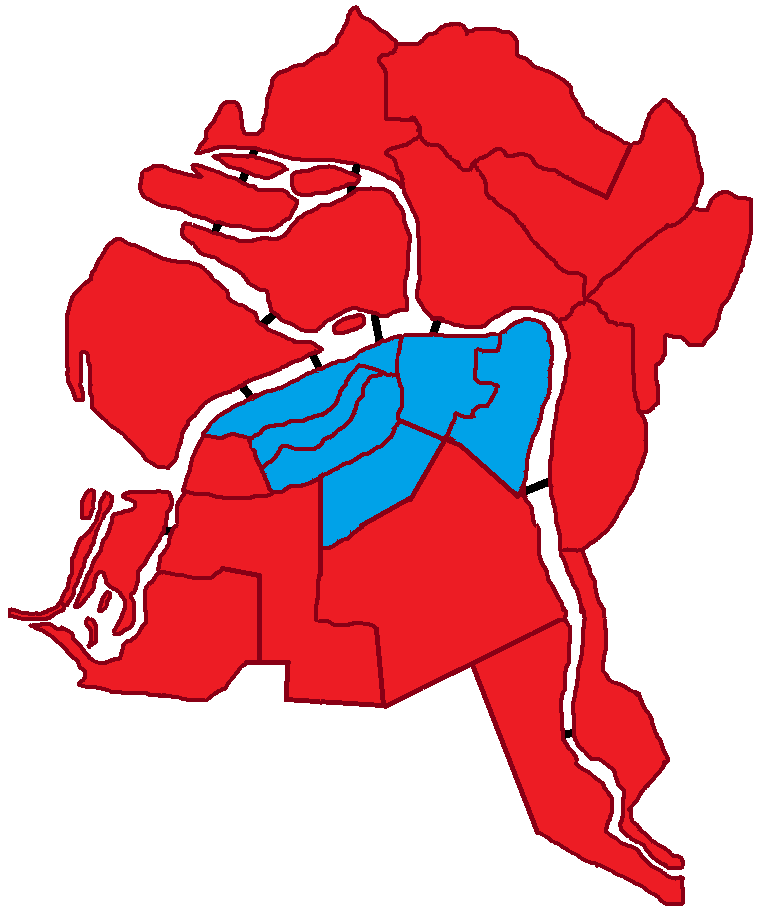
Petrograd city All Russian Constituent Assembly election 1917 by district. Red = Bolsheviks most voted, Blue = Kadets most voted.

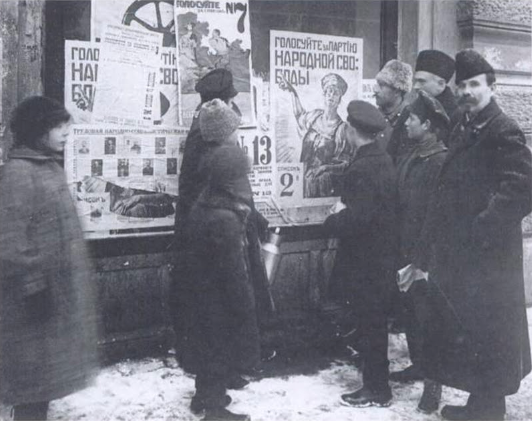
Voters inspecting campaign posters, Petrograd

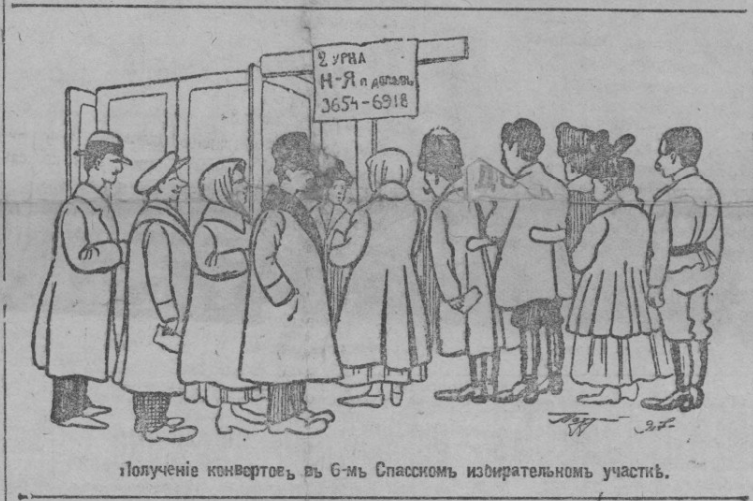
Illustration in Petrogradskaya Gazeta, depicting voters in Spassky District

The Petrograd Metropolis electoral district (Russian: Петроградский столичный избирательный округ) was a constituency created for the 1917 Russian Constituent Assembly election. Petrograd city constituted an electoral district of its own, separate from the rest of the Petrograd Governorate. Voter turnout in the capital was estimated at between 69.7% and 72%.

== Parties in the fray ==
=== Socialist-Revolutionaries ===
The Petrograd SR branch was dominated by left-wing and centrist elements.

=== Kadets ===
The Kadet list (no. 2) was headed by Pavel Milyukov, followed by Maxim Vinaver, Nikolai Kutler, F.I. Rodichev, Vladimir Dmitrievich Nabokov, Andrei Ivanovich Shingarev, Countess Sofia Panina, Aleksandr Kornilov, D.D. Grimm, D.S. Zernov, Vladimir Vernadsky, A.N. Kolosov, A.D. Protopopov, Prince V.A. Obolensky, Sergey Oldenburg, L.A. Velikhov, K. N. Sokolov and V. M. Hessen.

=== Bolsheviks ===
The Bolshevik (no. 4) Bolsheviks headed by Vladimir Ilich Ulyanov (Lenin), followed by Evsei Aronovich Radomyslsky (Zinoviev), Lev Davydovich Bronstein (Trotsky), Lev Borisovich Rosenfeld (Kamenev), Alexandra Kollontai, Iosif Vissarionovich Dzhugashvili (Stalin), Matvei Muranov, Mikhail Kalinin, Józef Unszlicht, Sergei Alexandrovich Cherepanov, Grigorii Eremeevich Evdokimov, Klavdia Ivanovna Nikolaeva and others.

=== Others ===
There was also List 13, the Women's Union for the Motherland. This organization had been formed in Petrograd in June 1917, and had called Russian women to form "Death Battalions" and join the soldiers at the front.

== Results ==
Petrograd City
| Party | Vote | % | Seats | % |
|---|---|---|---|---|
| List 4 - Bolsheviks | 424,027 | 45.00 | 6 | 50.00 |
| List 2 - Kadets | 246,506 | 26.16 | 4 | 33.33 |
| List 9 - Socialist-Revolutionaries | 152,230 | 16.15 | 2 | 16.67 |
| List 12 - United Orthodox Parishes | 24,139 | 2.56 | 0 | 0.00 |
| List 1 - Popular Socialists | 19,109 | 2.03 | 0 | 0.00 |
| List 17 - Menshevik Defencists (Potresovites) | 17,427 | 1.85 | 0 | 0.00 |
| List 15 - International Unity of Christian Democrats (Roman Catholics) | 14,382 | 1.53 | 0 | 0.00 |
| List 16 - Mensheviks | 11,740 | 1.25 | 0 | 0.00 |
| List 19 - Council of the Union of Cossack Host | 6,712 | 0.71 | 0 | 0.00 |
| List 7 - All-Russian League for Women's Equality | 5,310 | 0.56 | 0 | 0.00 |
| List 14 - Independent Union of Workers, Soldiers and Peasants | 4,942 | 0.52 | 0 | 0.00 |
| List 8 - Petrograd Group of SR Defencists (Volya Naroda group) | 4,696 | 0.50 | 0 | 0.00 |
| List 6 - Petrograd organizations of the Ukrainian Soc.-Dem. Labour Party, Ukrainian SRs and United Jewish Socialist Labour Party (S.S. and E.S.) | 4,219 | 0.45 | 0 | 0.00 |
| List 3 - Christian Democratic Party | 3,797 | 0.40 | 0 | 0.00 |
| List 18 - All-Russian Soc.-Dem. Organization "Unity" | 1,823 | 0.19 | 0 | 0.00 |
| List 11 - Central Committee of the Russian Radical Democratic Party | 413 | 0.04 | 0 | 0.00 |
| List 10 - People's Development League | 386 | 0.04 | 0 | 0.00 |
| List 13 - Women's Union for Motherland | 318 | 0.03 | 0 | 0.00 |
| List 5 - Universal League of National Associations of Socialist-Universalists | 158 | 0.02 | 0 | 0.00 |
| Total: | 942,334 | 100.00 | 12 | 100.00 |

Deputies Elected
| Kutler | Kadet |
| Milyukov | Kadet |
| Rodichev | Kadet |
| Vinaver | Kadet |
| Cherepanov | Bolshevik |
| Evdokimov | Bolshevik |
| Kalinin | Bolshevik |
| Stalin | Bolshevik |
| Unszlicht | Bolshevik |
| Zinoviev | Bolshevik |
| Kamkov | SR |
| Shreider | SR |

=== Vote by district ===
| | List 1 Popular Socialists | % | List 2 Kadets | % | List 3 Christ. Dem. (Orthodox) | % | List 4 Bolsheviks | % | List 5 Socialists- Universal. | % | List 6 Ukrainians | % | List 7 Women's League | % | List 8 SR Defencists | % | List 9 SRs | % | List 10 L.R.N. | % | List 11 Radical Democrats | % | List 12 Orthodox | % | List 13 Women's Union | % | List 14 Independent Union | % | List 15 Catholics | % | List 16 Mensheviks | % | List 17 Mensheviks Defencists | % | List 18 Unity | % | List 19 Cossacks | % |
|---|---|---|---|---|---|---|---|---|---|---|---|---|---|---|---|---|---|---|---|---|---|---|---|---|---|---|---|---|---|---|---|---|---|---|---|---|---|---|
| Admiralteysky | 496 | 3.71% | 5,812 | 43.42% | 67 | 0.50% | 3,080 | 23.01% | 1 | 0.01% | 39 | 0.29% | 118 | 0.88% | 75 | 0.56% | 2,374 | 17.73% | 11 | 0.08% | 6 | 0.04% | 355 | 2.65% | 2 | 0.01% | 86 | 0.64% | 374 | 2.79% | 91 | 0.68% | 188 | 1.40% | 22 | 0.16% | 190 | 1.42% |
| Aleksandro-Nevsky | 837 | 1.40% | 12,556 | 21.02% | 248 | 0.42% | 28,935 | 48.45% | 13 | 0.02% | 65 | 0.11% | 317 | 0.53% | 235 | 0.39% | 11,564 | 19.36% | 20 | 0.03% | 24 | 0.04% | 1,768 | 2.96% | 31 | 0.05% | 441 | 0.74% | 827 | 1.38% | 593 | 0.99% | 822 | 1.38% | 83 | 0.14% | 344 | 0.58% |
| Kazansky | 737 | 3.28% | 10,827 | 48.17% | 395 | 1.76% | 4,467 | 19.88% | 7 | 0.03% | 26 | 0.12% | 187 | 0.83% | 121 | 0.54% | 3146 | 14.00% | 18 | 0.08% | 17 | 0.08% | 644 | 2.87% | 13 | 0.06% | 166 | 0.74% | 710 | 3.16% | 260 | 1.16% | 471 | 2.10% | 60 | 0.27% | 203 | 0.90% |
| Kolomensky | 1,192 | 3.14% | 12,902 | 33.94% | 117 | 0.31% | 13,578 | 35.72% | 4 | 0.01% | 71 | 0.19% | 223 | 0.59% | 187 | 0.49% | 5,503 | 14.48% | 21 | 0.06% | 17 | 0.04% | 1643 | 4.32% | 17 | 0.04% | 135 | 0.36% | 821 | 2.16% | 442 | 1.16% | 870 | 2.29% | 42 | 0.11% | 230 | 0.61% |
| Lesnoi | 467 | 2.19% | 5,827 | 27.28% | 86 | 0.40% | 10,001 | 46.82% | 21 | 0.10% | 53 | 0.25% | 100 | 0.47% | 134 | 0.63% | 2,713 | 12.70% | 11 | 0.05% | 13 | 0.06% | 299 | 1.40% | 11 | 0.05% | 103 | 0.48% | 281 | 1.32% | 455 | 2.13% | 560 | 2.62% | 51 | 0.24% | 175 | 0.82% |
| Lityeiny | 1,474 | 3.03% | 23,565 | 48.36% | 183 | 0.38% | 9,581 | 19.66% | 16 | 0.03% | 141 | 0.29% | 396 | 0.81% | 303 | 0.62% | 6,672 | 13.69% | 21 | 0.04% | 27 | 0.06% | 2089 | 4.29% | 24 | 0.05% | 347 | 0.71% | 1,161 | 2.38% | 551 | 1.13% | 1,174 | 2.41% | 149 | 0.31% | 852 | 1.75% |
| Moskovsky | 2,239 | 3.31% | 30,229 | 44.69% | 298 | 0.44% | 17,728 | 26.21% | 11 | 0.02% | 152 | 0.22% | 490 | 0.72% | 392 | 0.58% | 8,292 | 12.26% | 24 | 0.04% | 42 | 0.06% | 2,054 | 3.04% | 20 | 0.03% | 444 | 0.66% | 1523 | 2.25% | 966 | 1.43% | 1,705 | 2.52% | 231 | 0.34% | 797 | 1.18% |
| Narvsky | 1,220 | 1.33% | 18,762 | 20.48% | 322 | 0.35% | 44,372 | 48.43% | 20 | 0.02% | 204 | 0.22% | 571 | 0.62% | 326 | 0.36% | 17,313 | 18.90% | 30 | 0.03% | 39 | 0.04% | 2,734 | 2.98% | 18 | 0.02% | 363 | 0.40% | 2,421 | 2.64% | 915 | 1.00% | 1,432 | 1.56% | 106 | 0.12% | 454 | 0.50% |
| Nevsky | 267 | 0.61% | 4,681 | 10.70% | 220 | 0.50% | 18,056 | 41.29% | 8 | 0.02% | 73 | 0.17% | 267 | 0.61% | 229 | 0.52% | 17,065 | 39.02% | 20 | 0.05% | 6 | 0.01% | 947 | 2.17% | 21 | 0.05% | 250 | 0.57% | 482 | 1.10% | 316 | 0.72% | 583 | 1.33% | 76 | 0.17% | 167 | 0.38% |
| Novoderevensky | 155 | 1.24% | 3,241 | 25.88% | 74 | 0.59% | 5,746 | 45.88% | 1 | 0.01% | 25 | 0.20% | 93 | 0.74% | 43 | 0.34% | 1,814 | 14.48% | 2 | 0.02% | 2 | 0.02% | 535 | 4.27% | 2 | 0.02% | 87 | 0.69% | 79 | 0.63% | 210 | 1.68% | 288 | 2.30% | 20 | 0.16% | 108 | 0.86% |
| Okhtensky | 202 | 0.96% | 4,984 | 23.80% | 82 | 0.39% | 9,525 | 45.48% | 2 | 0.01% | 34 | 0.16% | 188 | 0.90% | 91 | 0.43% | 4,181 | 19.97% | 5 | 0.02% | 6 | 0.03% | 637 | 3.04% | 15 | 0.07% | 224 | 1.07% | 121 | 0.58% | 160 | 0.76% | 295 | 1.41% | 19 | 0.09% | 170 | 0.81% |
| Petergofsky | 153 | 0.36% | 2,770 | 6.56% | 144 | 0.34% | 28,754 | 68.08% | 5 | 0.01% | 74 | 0.18% | 159 | 0.38% | 126 | 0.30% | 7,901 | 18.71% | 7 | 0.02% | 8 | 0.02% | 499 | 1.18% | 12 | 0.03% | 176 | 0.42% | 653 | 1.55% | 261 | 0.62% | 353 | 0.84% | 20 | 0.05% | 69 | 0.16% |
| Petrogradsky | 3,150 | 2.72% | 38,969 | 33.70% | 441 | 0.38% | 45,155 | 39.05% | 18 | 0.02% | 246 | 0.21% | 713 | 0.62% | 863 | 0.75% | 14,297 | 12.37% | 51 | 0.04% | 81 | 0.07% | 2532 | 2.19% | 36 | 0.03% | 565 | 0.49% | 1,215 | 1.05% | 2,117 | 1.83% | 3673 | 3.18% | 396 | 0.34% | 1105 | 0.96% |
| Porokhovsky | 83 | 0.67% | 1,011 | 8.19% | 78 | 0.63% | 6,382 | 51.69% | 3 | 0.02% | 71 | 0.58% | 63 | 0.51% | 35 | 0.28% | 4,016 | 32.53% | 4 | 0.03% | 5 | 0.04% | 141 | 1.14% | 10 | 0.08% | 42 | 0.34% | 103 | 0.83% | 88 | 0.71% | 157 | 1.27% | 13 | 0.11% | 41 | 0.33% |
| Polyustrovsky | 95 | 0.75% | 1,369 | 10.83% | 35 | 0.28% | 8,017 | 63.44% | 6 | 0.05% | 22 | 0.17% | 50 | 0.40% | 39 | 0.31% | 2,249 | 17.80% | 6 | 0.05% | 3 | 0.02% | 243 | 1.92% | 6 | 0.05% | 59 | 0.47% | 125 | 0.99% | 121 | 0.96% | 138 | 1.09% | 14 | 0.11% | 41 | 0.32% |
| Rozhdestvenny | 1,702 | 3.13% | 20,911 | 38.41% | 175 | 0.32% | 15,365 | 28.22% | 10 | 0.02% | 138 | 0.25% | 327 | 0.60% | 429 | 0.79% | 7,777 | 14.28% | 37 | 0.07% | 26 | 0.05% | 3,018 | 5.54% | 24 | 0.04% | 419 | 0.77% | 867 | 1.59% | 785 | 1.44% | 1704 | 3.13% | 153 | 0.28% | 581 | 1.07% |
| Spassky | 1,141 | 3.46% | 14,115 | 42.77% | 100 | 0.30% | 10,381 | 31.46% | 4 | 0.01% | 88 | 0.27% | 234 | 0.71% | 199 | 0.60% | 3,433 | 10.40% | 16 | 0.05% | 23 | 0.07% | 981 | 2.97% | 15 | 0.05% | 360 | 1.09% | 841 | 2.55% | 363 | 1.10% | 368 | 1.12% | 71 | 0.22% | 266 | 0.81% |
| Vasileostrovsky | 2,142 | 2.27% | 23,694 | 25.06% | 426 | 0.45% | 45,517 | 48.14% | 11 | 0.01% | 139 | 0.15% | 553 | 0.58% | 547 | 0.58% | 14,517 | 15.35% | 37 | 0.04% | 48 | 0.05% | 2228 | 2.36% | 24 | 0.03% | 307 | 0.32% | 1,247 | 1.32% | 911 | 0.96% | 1,408 | 1.49% | 211 | 0.22% | 583 | 0.62% |
| Vyborgsky | 528 | 1.10% | 5,594 | 11.70% | 193 | 0.40% | 32,446 | 67.85% | 9 | 0.02% | 86 | 0.18% | 181 | 0.38% | 123 | 0.26% | 6,116 | 12.79% | 19 | 0.04% | 5 | 0.01% | 640 | 1.34% | 10 | 0.02% | 181 | 0.38% | 357 | 0.75% | 496 | 1.04% | 613 | 1.28% | 45 | 0.09% | 179 | 0.37% |
| Military votes | 733 | 0.83% | 4935 | 5.60% | 114 | 0.13% | 67,868 | 76.95% | 7 | 0.01% | 2,506 | 2.84% | 23 | 0.03% | 241 | 0.27% | 9,980 | 11.32% | 20 | 0.02% | 22 | 0.02% | 161 | 0.18% | 1 | 0.00% | 198 | 0.22% | 190 | 0.22% | 482 | 0.55% | 495 | 0.56% | 53 | 0.06% | 166 | 0.19% |

== Ballots and campaign materials ==
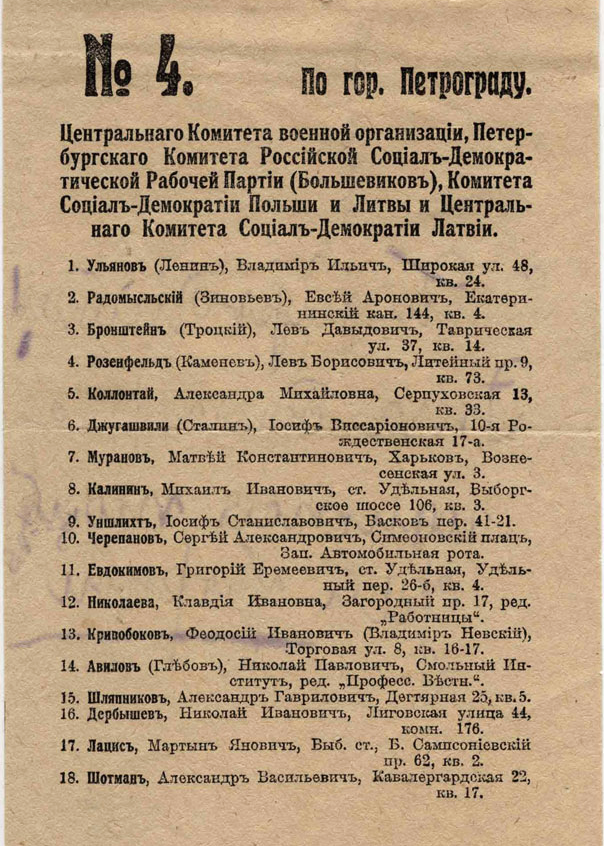
Bolshevik ballot for Petrograd City. The list carries the title Central Committee of Military Organizations, Petrograd Committee of the Russian Social Democratic Labour Party (Bolsheviks), Committee of the Social Democracy of Poland and Lithuania, Central Committee of the Social Democracy of Latvia. The list has 18 candidates, headed by Lenin, Zinoviev, Trotsky, Kamenev, Kollontai and Stalin.

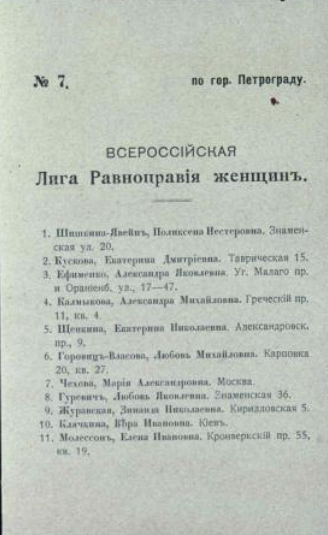
Ballot of the All-Russian Women's Equal Rights League (List no. 7) in Petrograd City. The list was headed by Poliksena Shishkina-Iavein.

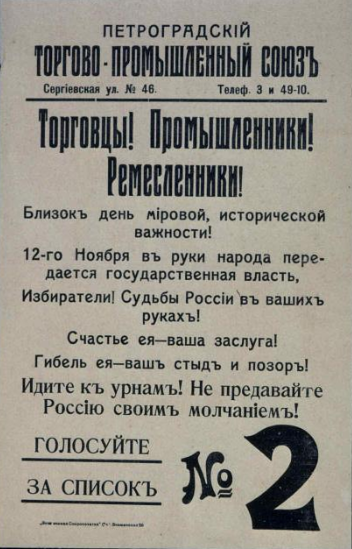
Poster issued by the Petrograd Commercial-Industrial Union, calling traders, producers and craftsmen to vote for the Kadet List 2

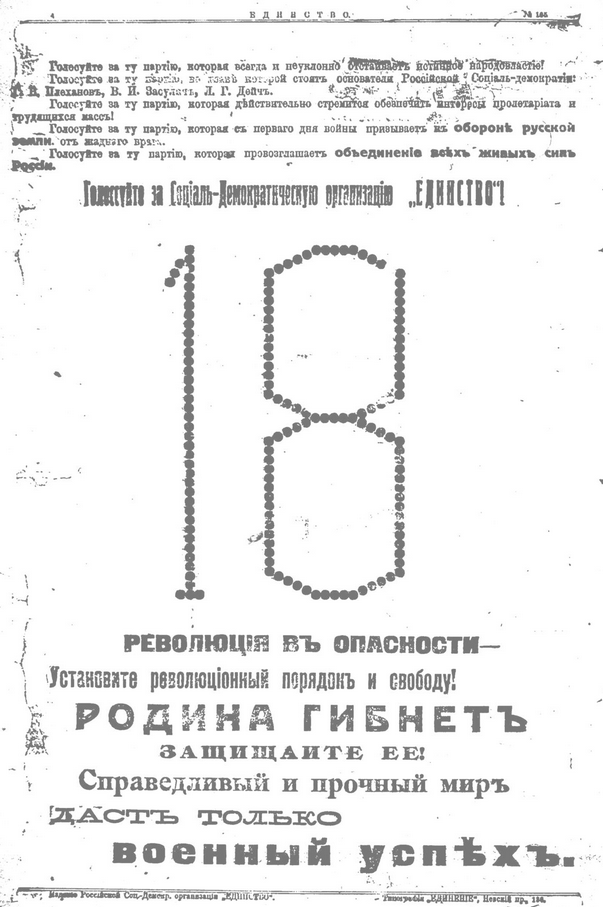
Electoral propaganda for List 18, Plekhanov's Unity group

Campaign poster for List 7 - All-Russian League for Women's Equality
