= Sofia Panina =

Russian heiress, philanthropist and politician (1871–1956)

Countess Sofia Panina
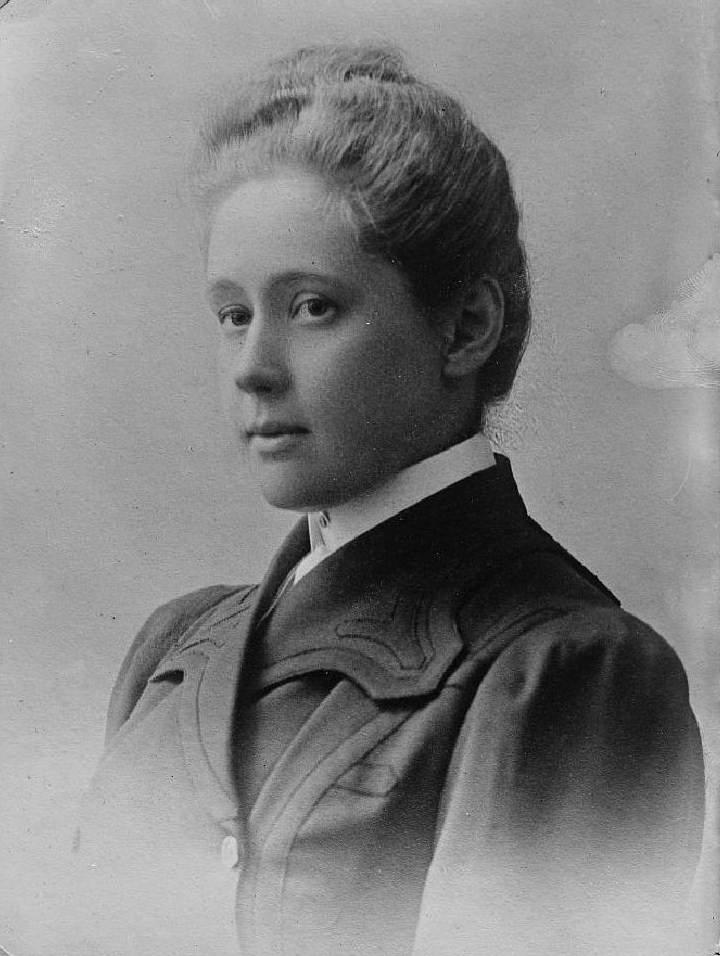
- Countess Sophia Vladimirovna Panina (1888)
- Native name: Софья Владимировна Панина
- Born: 23 August 1871; Moscow, Russian Empire
- Died: 16 June 1956 (aged 84); New York City, U.S.
- Buried: Novo-Diveevo Russian Orthodox Cemetery
- Offices: Vice Minister of State Welfare; Vice Minister of Education
- Noble family: Panin
- Spouse: Alexander Polovstov
- Father: Count Vladimir Viktorovich Panin
- Mother: Anastasia Sergeevna Maltsova

Countess Sofia Vladimirovna Panina (Russian: Софья Владимировна Панина; 23 August 1871 – 16 June 1956) was Vice Minister of State Welfare and Vice Minister of Education in the Provisional Government following the Russian February Revolution, 1917. She was tried for appropriating the funds of the Ministry of Education after the October Revolution and released with "the lightest sentence possible" after a payment from her friends. She was the last member of the aristocratic Panin family.

== Family background ==
Countess Sofia Vladimirovna Panina was the daughter of Count Vladimir Viktorovich Panin and Anastasia Sergeevna Maltsova. Her maternal grandfather, General Sergei Ivanovich Mal'tsov (1801–93) was an industrialist whose diverse enterprises once employed over 100,000 workers. Count Viktor Nikitich Panin, her paternal grandfather, was one of Russia's richest serfowners as well as Minister of Justice for over twenty five years. Panina's father died in 1872 when she was not even two years old, leaving her the principal heir of the enormous Panin fortune. Her mother, who served as trustee of her inheritance, remarried in 1882. Her step-father, Ivan Petrunkevich (ru), was one of the founders of the Russian liberal movement against the autocracy, later co-founder in 1905 of the major liberal party, the Constitutional Democrat Party (Kadets). Petrunkevich had been arrested and sent into internal exile in 1879 for his oppositionist activity, and Anastasia's marriage to him greatly alarmed the Panin family. Sofia Panina's paternal grandmother, Countess Natalia Pavlovna Panina, successfully petitioned Emperor Alexander III to remove eleven-year-old Sofia from her mother's custody, and enrolled her at the Catherine Institute in St Petersburg, one of the elite boarding schools for noble girls. Entering Petersburg society after graduation, Sofia Panina married a millionaire Alexander Polovstov in 1890. He was the homosexual son of Alexander Polovtsov whose mother was rumoured to be Alexander II's cousin. By 1896, however, she divorced him and reverted to her maiden name. They had no children, and she never officially remarried.

== Charitable work ==
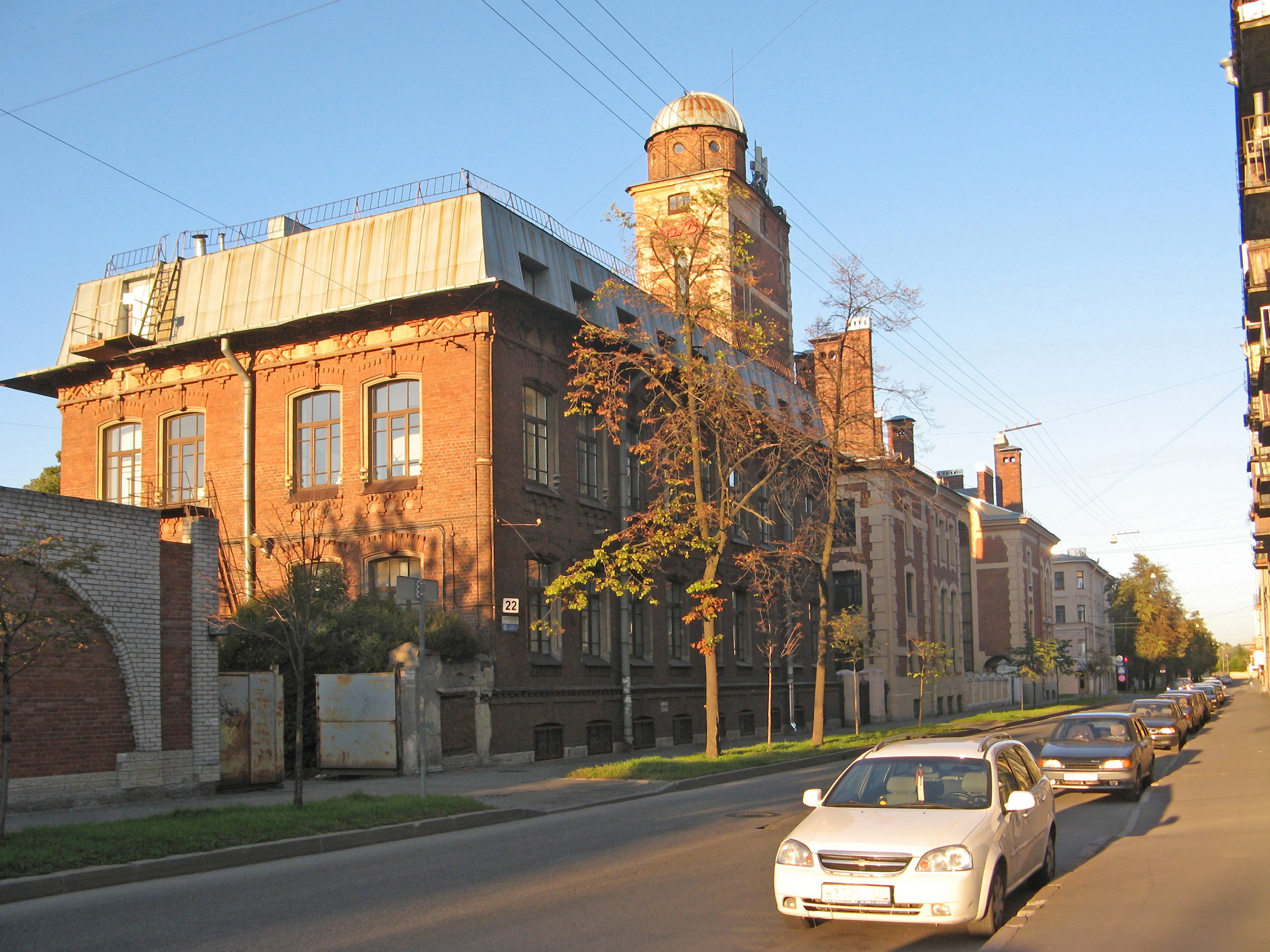
Ligovsky People's House, Prilukskaya Street

In 1891 Sofia Panina met a Petersburg schoolteacher twenty years older than herself, Aleksandra Vasil'evna Peshekhonova, to whose influence she attributed the decisive turn her life took in the 1890s, away from the world of aristocratic high society and toward progressive philanthropy. Panina and Peshekhonova first created a caféteria for poor schoolchildren in a working-class district of Saint Petersburg. They gradually added Sunday popular readings for the children's parents and older siblings, founded a library, and began offering evening courses for adults. In 1903 Panina employed Julius Benois to build one central building to house all of the diverse services she and Peshekhonova had started in the 1890s, known as Ligovsky People's House, for working-class residents of the same impoverished district on southern outskirts of Saint Petersburg. It pursued a progressive mission to advance popular education, cultural elevation, and rational entertainment for adults and children, as part of her project to support their development as citizens. The building still operates as a community center in Saint Petersburg today, under the name of the Railroad Workers' Palace of Culture. Its evening courses and literary circles provided a meeting-place for working-class men with socialist sympathies, and during the 1905 Revolution, Panina opened Ligovsky People's House to various political groups for meetings and rallies. On 9 May 1906 Vladimir Lenin addressed his first mass meeting in Russia there.

Panina also was a co-founder and major financial supporter of the Russian Society for the Protection of Women in 1900, an anti-prostitution organization. In addition to building schools and hospitals on her various estate, she also provided assistance to countless individuals. In 1901 she loaned her Crimean estate, Gaspra, to the novelist Leo Tolstoy, then suffering from a life-threatening illness; Tolstoy and his family lived at her estate for almost a year.

== Political career ==
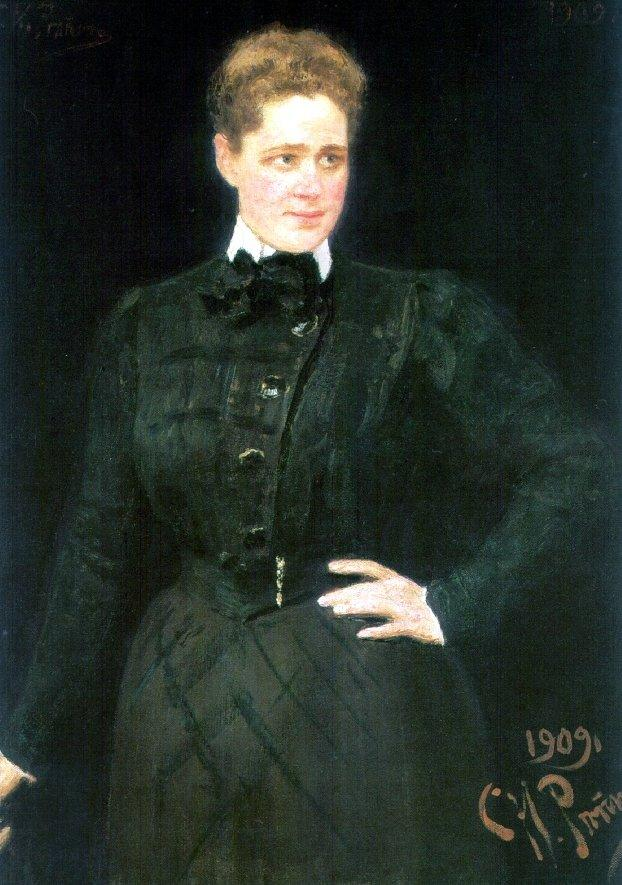
Ilya Repin's portrait of Countess Panina (1909)

Although her mother had married Petrunkevich, it was not until the February Revolution of 1917 that Sofia started playing a role in politics. She wrote in her memoirs: "I never belonged to any political party and my interests were concentrated on questions of education and general culture, which alone, I was deeply convinced, could provide a firm foundation for a free political order." However, during the war she worked for Saint Petersburg City Duma ensuring the families of reservists called up for the war were being looked after. On International Women's Day, 1917, Panina along with some other suitable women were appointed as delegates to the Petrograd (Saint Petersburg) Duma. Their positions were confirmed in the August elections. She was elected to the Kadet Party Central Committee at the beginning of May and was soon the first woman in world history to hold a cabinet position when she became assistant minister in the newly created Ministry of State Welfare, under Minister Prince Dmitry Shakhovskoy. Then in August she was made assistant minister of education under Sergey Oldenburg, the Minister of Education. The Kadet Party placed her on its Petrograd list of candidates for the elections to the Constituent Assembly, held in mid-November, but the party failed to gain enough votes to include her among its delegates.

However, when the Kadet Party was faced with the October Revolution of 1917, Sofia was to play an even more prominent role. On the night of 25 October the Duma sent her as one of three delegates to visit the Aurora in an unsuccessful attempt to persuade them to hold their fire. Following the seizure of power, her home at 23 Sergievskaya Street in Liteinyi district was used for meetings of three important anti-Bolshevik groups: the Little Council (also known as the Underground Provisional Government), the Committee for the Salvation of the Homeland and Revolution composed of Kadet and socialist Duma delegates headed by Nikolai Astrov (ru), the Kadet mayor of Petrograd. Also the Central Committee of the Kadet Party met there. Acting on the orders of the Kadet ministers Aleksandr Konovalov and Nikolai Kishkin to sabotage Bolshevik rule after the October Revolution, on 15 November she authorised the transfer of the entire funds of the Ministry of Education (93,000 rubles in total) to an unidentified account, in all likelihood in a foreign bank, to keep them out of the hands of the new government. An accusation was filed with the Revolutionary Tribunal of the Petrograd Soviet by the assistant commissar for education Isak Rogal’skii, who could not complete his takeover of the ministry, and Panina was arrested on 28 November. During her initial interrogation, she admitted having ordered the removal of the funds but refused to disclose their destination on the grounds of her loyalty to the Provisional Government. She was then offered a bail deal by a member of the Tribunal's Investigative Committee which she rejected as the amount was double the sum transferred away from the Ministry.

== Trial ==
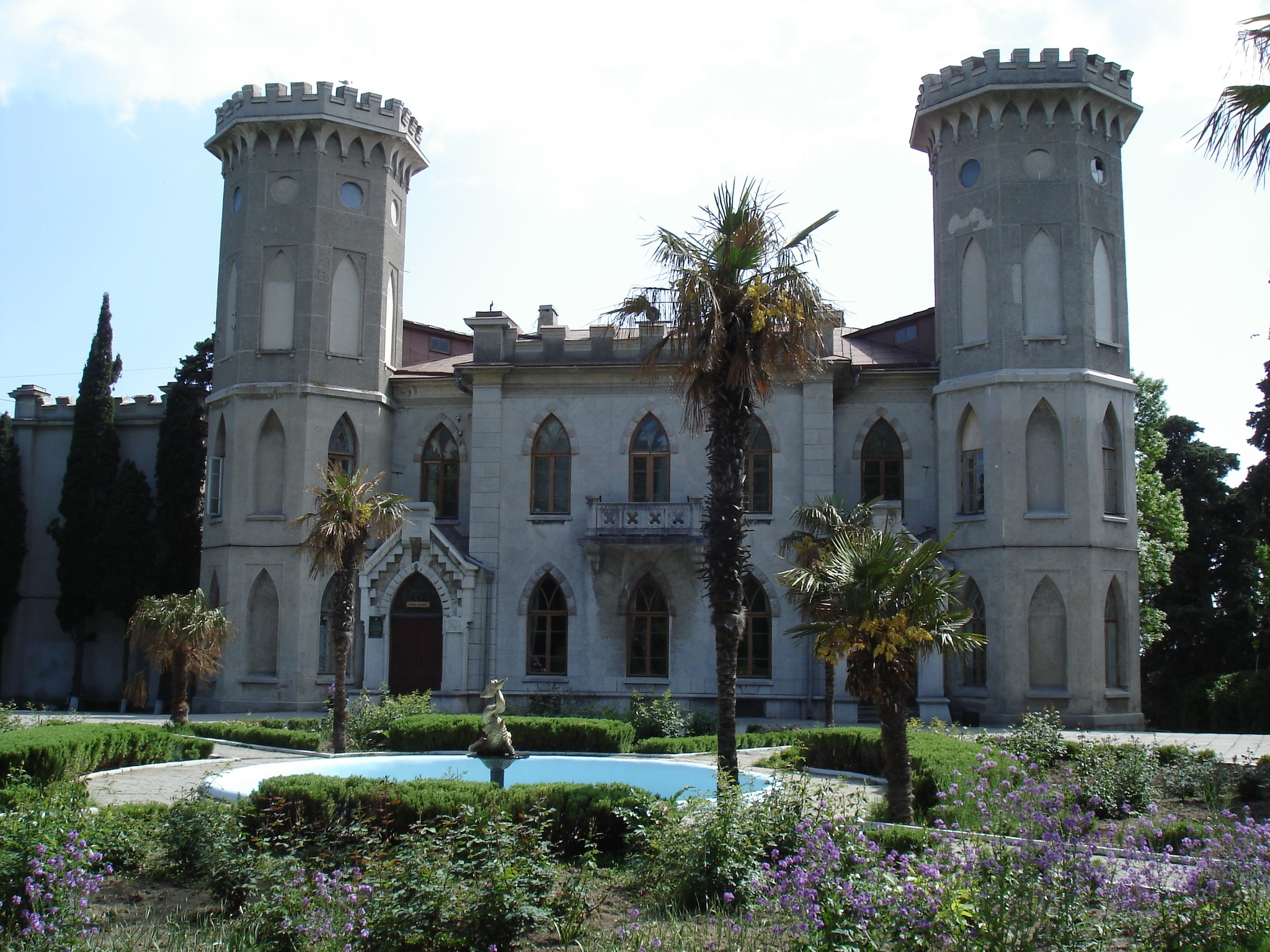
The villa of Countess Panina in Gaspra, Crimea was built in the 1830s. She loaned it to Leo Tolstoy, among others.

Sofia Panina was tried by the Revolutionary Tribunal of the Petrograd Soviet on 10 December 1917 on the charge of embezzling 93,000 rubles from the Ministry of Education. The trial was held in the Nicholas Palace, with the foreign correspondents John Reed and Louise Bryant in attendance. Since the matter hinged on the defendant's refusal to recognise and cooperate with the new government, it has been argued in recent North American scholarship to constitute the first political trial in Bolshevik-ruled Russia, which echoes the claim Panina's lawyer made in court. Julie Cassiday has described the trial as showing "nascent theatricality of the Bolshevik law court." Adele Lindenmeyr, Panina's biographer, has similarly analysed the trial in histrionic terms. Such a perspective is in line with Panina's self-defensive account in her memoirs, where she casts doubt on the proceedings by calling them staged.

The Tribunal was chaired by the worker Ivan Zhukov and consisted of seven men, two soldiers and five workers, six of whom were members of the Bolshevik Party. No prosecutor was appointed and no one from the public initially volunteered for the duty. Iakov Gurevich (ru), representing Panina, argued for the political character of the trial by alleging that no universally recognized laws existed after the revolution, and claimed that the funds of the Ministry of Education constituted a private charitable donation. The worker Ivanov, a member of the Socialist Revolutionary Party, then volunteered to defend Panina by using character evidence about her charitable support for popular education at the Narodnyi Dom. At this stage in the proceedings, Zhukov asked Panina if she would return the money within two days, which she refused, insisting that she was answerable on this matter to the Constituent Assembly alone.

Zhukov bypassed Grigory Kramarov, a Menshevik member of the All-Russian Congress of Soviets, a witness favourable to the defendant, and invited a worker called Naumov, who sought to put the value of Panina's charity in context by contrasting it with her actions on behalf of her class and "in organized opposition to the people’s authority." The last testimony came from assistant commissar Rogal’skii, who stated that the missing funds prevented the payment of overdue wages to the hungry education workers, among them many women teachers, and additionally charged her and her colleagues with taking holiday bonuses before transferring the money away. Finally, Panina spoke by comparing herself to a military sentry safeguarding the funds for the people, of which the only legal representation was the Constituent Assembly. As the Tribunal retired to consider their verdict, there was further dispute: Gurevich decried the order of proceedings, Rogal’skii tried to deliver additional documents, Sergei Oldenburg accused him of lying, and Kramarov was removed for his complaints about not having been allowed to speak.

The Tribunal declared Panina guilty of "opposition to the people’s authority" but only sentenced her to public censure in view of her good reputation. She was remanded to arrest until the missing funds were released to the Commissariat for Education. She was released nine days later, on 19 December, after her friends gathered the sum and paid it to the Tribunal.

== Flight and emigration ==
In 1918 she joined General Anton Denikin in South Russia alongside other leading Kadets, including Nikolai Ivanovich Astrov. Although they never married, Astrov and Panina lived as husband and wife until his death in 1934. She traveled with him to Paris in the summer of 1919 to represent Denikin in an attempt to get further support from allies for the White Russians. This failed and she returned to South Russia until the defeat of Denikin's Volunteer Army forced her to flee Russia forever in March 1920. Panina spent the rest of her life in emigration, first in Geneva, where she and Astrov lived from 1921 to 1924. As representatives of one of the major Russian emigre associations, Zemgor, they represented Russian refugee interests at the League of Nations High Commission for Refugees. In 1924 Panina was invited to Prague by the Czechoslovak government to become the director of Russkii ochag (Russian Hearth), a community center for Russian emigres. Astrov died in 1934, and when faced with the Nazi takeover of Czechoslovakia, she left Europe in December 1938 for the United States. After living for about a year in Los Angeles, Panina settled in New York City, where she collaborated with Alexandra Lvovna Tolstaya, Leo Tolstoy's youngest daughter, in founding the Tolstoy Foundation. First created to assist Russian emigres stranded in Europe as the threat of war grew, the Tolstoy Foundation soon became an important organization for assistance to prisoners of war and displaced persons. Panina died in New York City in June 1956.

== Bibliography ==
- Panina, Sofia V. (1957), "На Петербургской окраине" (PDF), Новый журнал, 49: 189–203
- Lindenmeyr, Adele (2001a), "The First Soviet Political Trial: Countess Sofia Panina before the Petrograd Revolutionary Tribunal", Russian Review, 60 (4): 505–525, doi:10.1111/0036-0341.00188
- Lindenmeyr, Adele (2001b), "Panina, Countess Sof'ia Vladimirovna (1871–1956)", in Noonan, Norma Corigliano; Nechemias, Carol (eds.), Encyclopedia of Russian Women's Movements, Westport, CT: Greenwood, pp. 49–51, ISBN 9780313016448
- Lindenmeyr, Adele (2012), "Building a Civil Society One Brick at a Time: People's Houses and Worker Enlightenment in Late Imperial Russia", Journal of Modern History, 84 (1): 1–39, doi:10.1086/663091, S2CID 143658513
- Lindenmeyr, Adele (2019), Citizen Countess: Sofia Panina and the Fate of Revolutionary Russia, Madison, WI: University of Wisconsin Press, ISBN 9780299325305
- Cassiday, Julie A. (2000), The Enemy on Trial: Early Soviet Courts on Stage and Screen, DeKalb, IL: Northern Illinois University Press
