= Benois House =

- Дом Бенуа (in Russian)
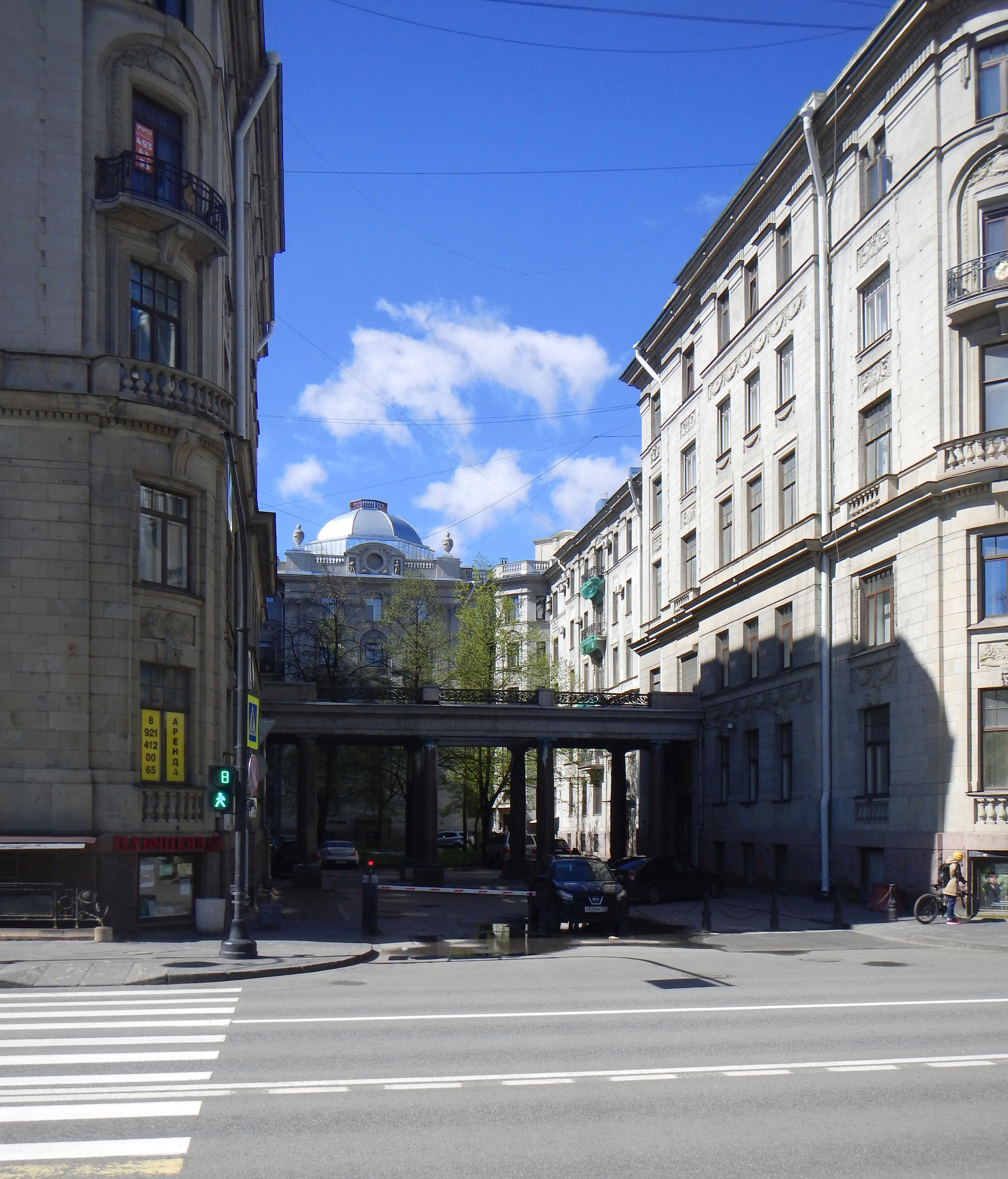
- Benois House in 2020
- Interactive map of the Benois House area
- Alternative names: Three Benois House

General information
- Architectural style: Art Nouveau
- Location: 26—28 Kamennoostrovsky Prospekt, Saint Petersburg, Russia
- Coordinates: 59°57′44.7″N 30°18′46.2″E
- Completed: 1911
- Inaugurated: 1914

Design and construction
- Architects: Leon Benois, Julius Benois, Albert Benois, Alexander Gunst

Benois House (Russian: До́м Бенуа́, romanized: Dóm Benuá), also widely known as the Three Benois House (Russian: До́м трёх Бенуа́, romanized: Dóm trokh Benuá), is a historic building in Saint Petersburg, Russia.

== History ==
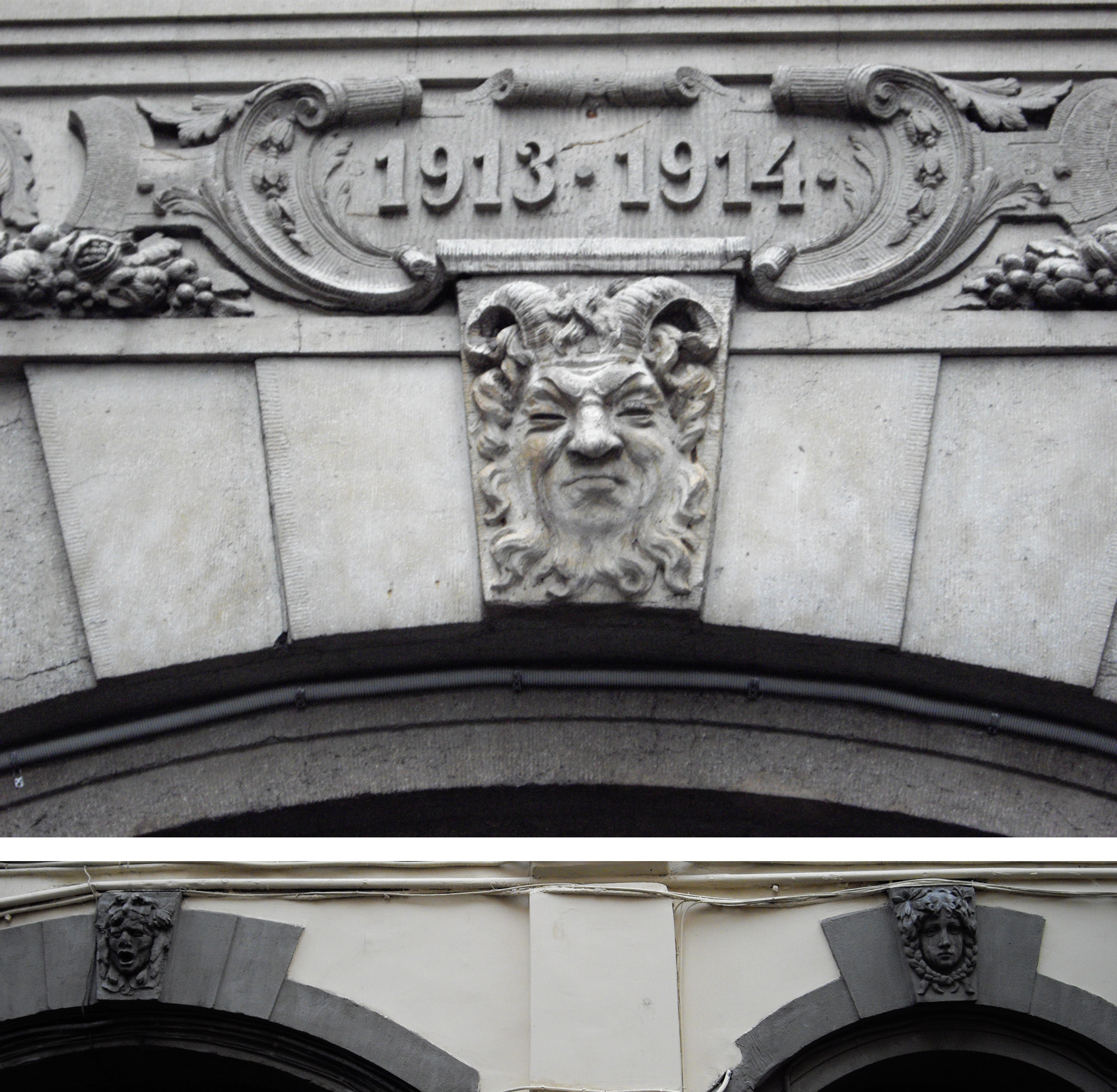
Benois House. Mascarons. 2009

The apartment house occupies almost a whole quarter on Kamennoostrovsky Prospekt. The locals call it “the Benois House ” or “the house of the Three Benois”, because it was designed by three members of a famous family of architects—brothers Leon Benois and Albert Benois and their cousin Julius Benois. The building was erected in 1911-1914 by order of the First Russian Insurance Company. The number of apartments during the construction of the house is 250, the number of front doors is 25, the number of courtyards is 12.

After the Russian Revolution of 1917 the house’s original residents—princes, counts and prosperous manufacturers were replaced by Bolshevik leaders. The apartments on Kamennoostrovsky Prospekt were taken by comrades Grigory Zinoviev, Jukka Rahja and other Vladimir Lenin’s brothers-in-arms. In April 1926 it became home for the heads of the Party’s Committee in Leningrad, Pyotr Popkov and Sergey Kirov. Kirov lived here until his death, and a memorial museum is now open for visitors in his former apartment.

Composer Dmitry Shostakovich was another famous resident of the Benois House—he had been living here for several years, while working on his Seventh (Leningrad) symphony.

In our times Benois house is known all over Russia due to the numerous TV crime series (Bandit Petersburg and others)—the house is situated close to Lenfilm and local TV studio. It is not only attractive to filmmakers for its good location, but also for a labyrinth of almost a dozen intricately connected inner courtyards.

== Residents of the Benois House ==
Many famous people of St. Petersburg lived in the Benois House (composers, artists, writers, scientists, architects, actors, state leaders, military leaders of the USSR). Among them: Prince Gabriel Constantinovich of Russia, Konstantin Makovsky, Boris Fredman-Kluzel, Andrei Mylnikov, Evgeny Kibrik, Alexey Parygin, Lyudmila Sergeeva, Vladimir Kachalsky, Boris Babochkin, Georgi Vasilyev, Evgenija Zbrueva, Nikolay Cherkasov, Leonid Lyubashevsky, Vlas Doroshevich, Alexander Prokofyev, Mikhail Chekhov, Alexey Skaldin, Joseph Berlin, Iosif Langbard, Andrew Ol, Natalia Bekhtereva, Alexander Vasiliev, Prince Andrei Grigorievich Gagarin, Rudolf Samoylovich, Yuri Demkov, Mikhail Neiman, Nikita Tolstoy, Sergei Kirov, Grigory Zinoviev, Semyon Voskov, Ivan Gaza, Nikolai Glebov-Avilov, Grigory Yevdokimov, Nikolay Komarov, Alexey Kuznetsov, Otto Wille Kuusinen, Boris Pozern, Eino Rahja, Kustaa Rovio, Georgy Safarov, Pyotr Smorodin, Nikolai Shvernik, Leonid Govorov, Boris Shaposhnikov, Pavel Dybenko, Vladimir Gittis and others.

== Bibliography ==
- Privalov V. D. Каменноостровский проспект. Дом № 26-28. — St. Petersburg: Petropolis, 2019. — P. 546. — 639 p. (RUS) ISBN 978-5-9676-0984-8
- Памятники архитектуры и истории Санкт-Петербурга. Петроградский район / Editor: B. M. Kirikova. — St. Petersburg: Kolo Publishing House, 2007. — 584 p. (RUS)ISBN 5-901841-21-2
- Bass V. Дом трех Бенуа. Жилой дом Первого российского страхового общества // The Village, SPb. May 29, 2017. (RUS)
- Privalov V. D. Каменноостровский проспект. — M.: Tsentrpoligraf, 2005. — pp. 292-335. — 639 p. (RUS) ISBN 5-9524-1882-1
- William Craft Brumfield A History of Russian Architecture. New York: Cambridge University Press, 1993.
- William Craft Brumfield The Origins of Modernism in Russian Architecture. Berkeley, Los Angeles, Oxford: University of California Press. — 1991. — P. 255.
- Ленинград: Путеводитель / Authors: V. A. Vityazeva, B. M. Kirikov. — Edition 2, stereotypical, with changes. — L .: Lenizdat, 1988. — pp. 203-248. — 366 p. (RUS)ISBN 5-289-00492-0

== Photos ==
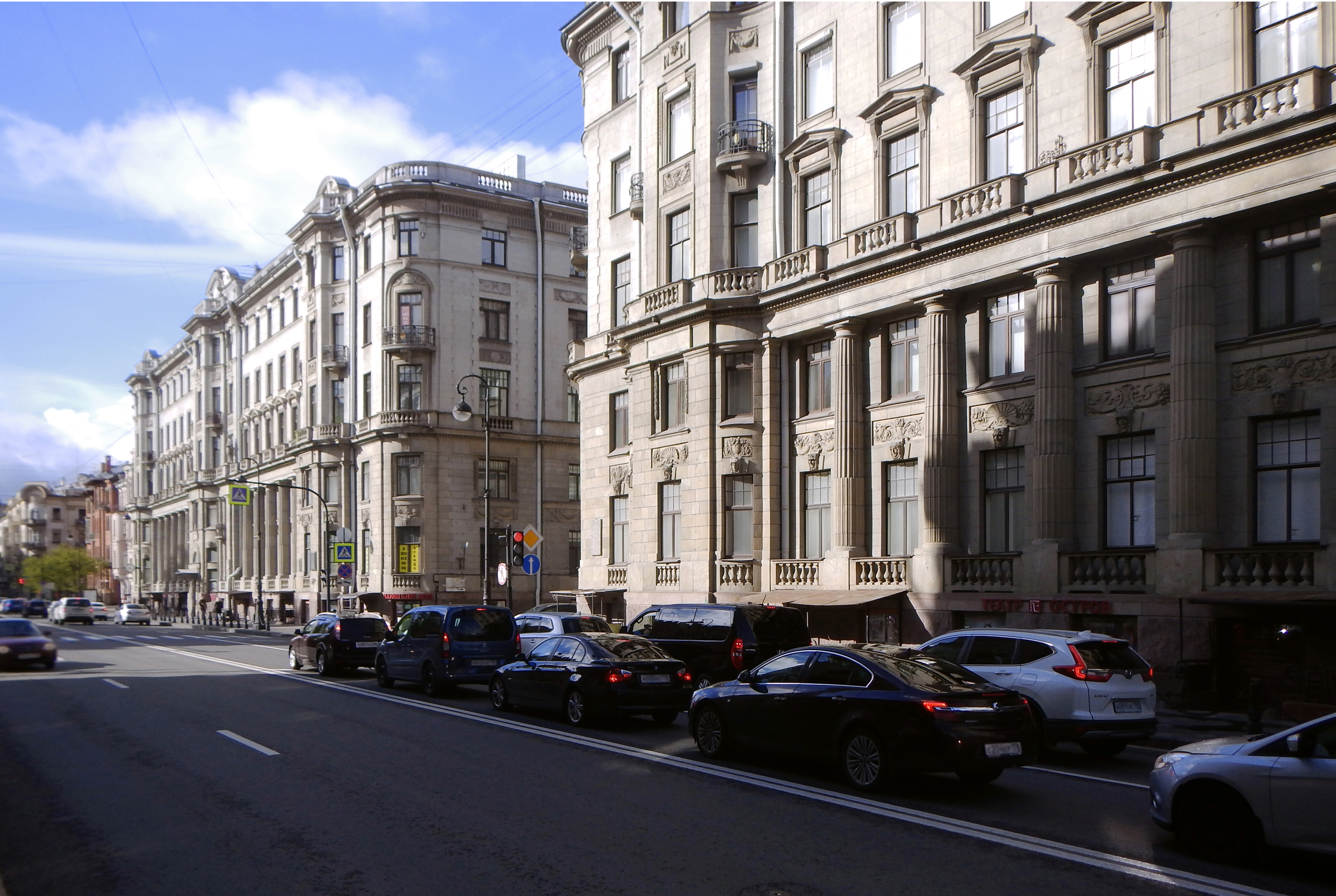

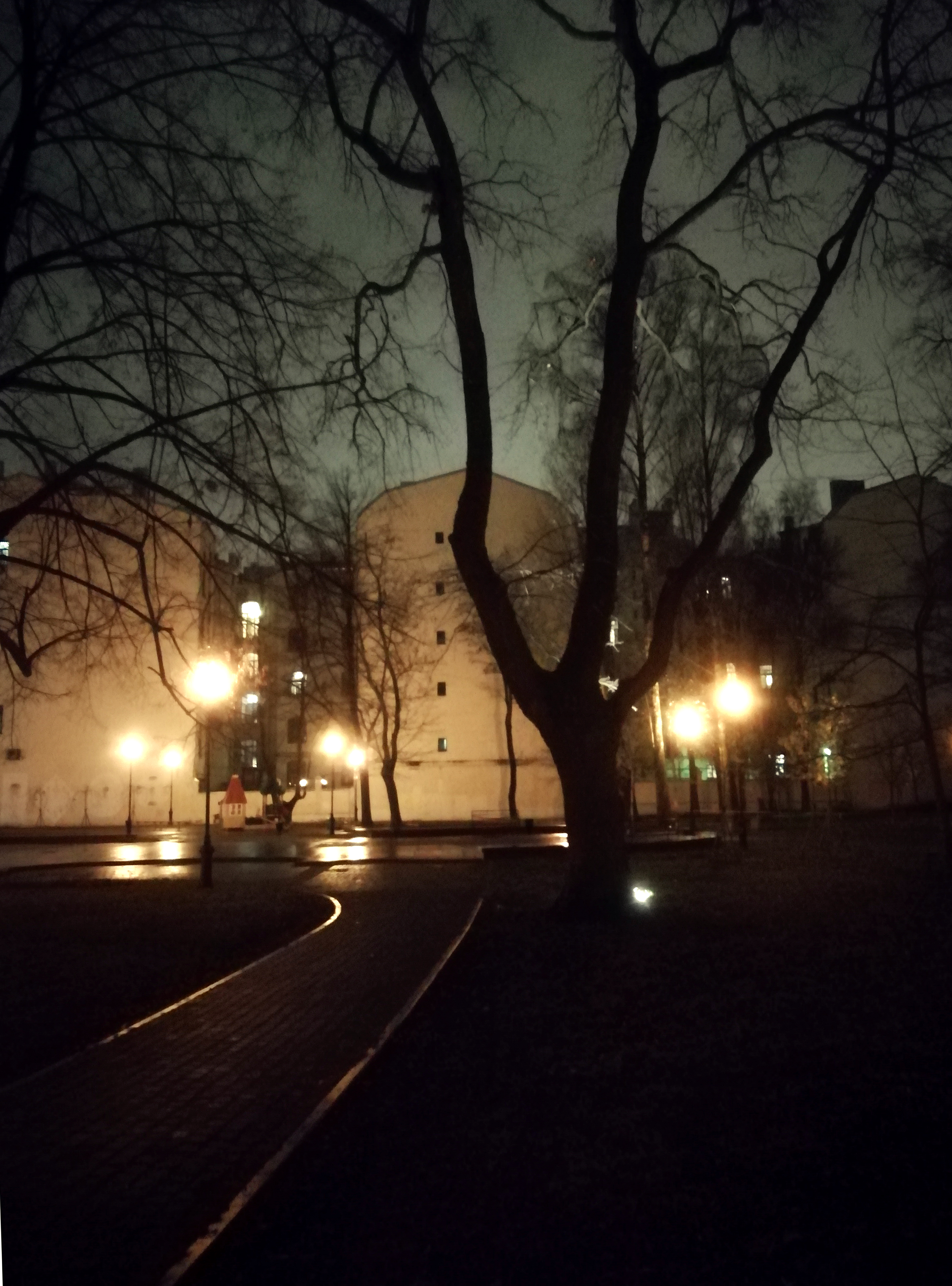

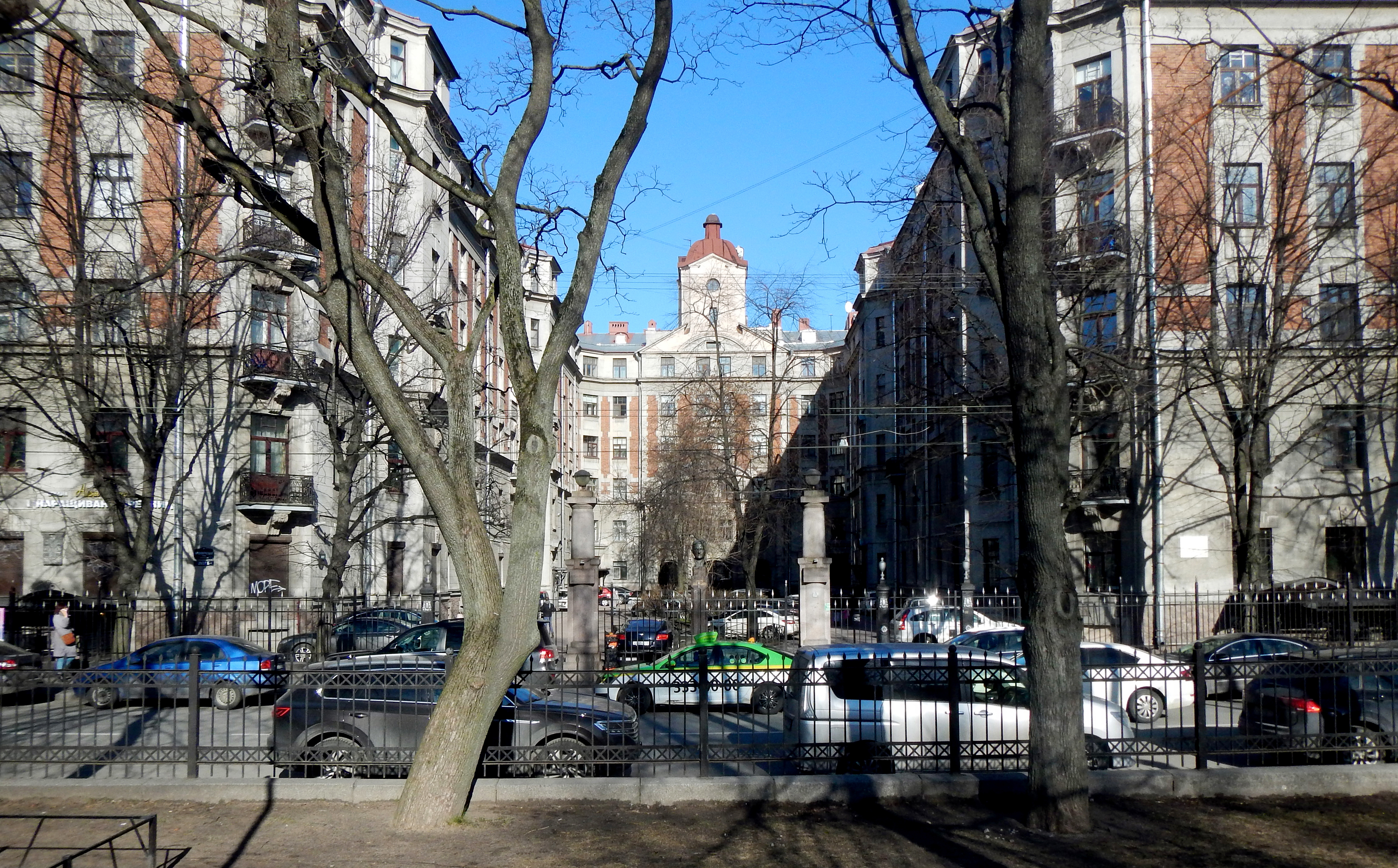

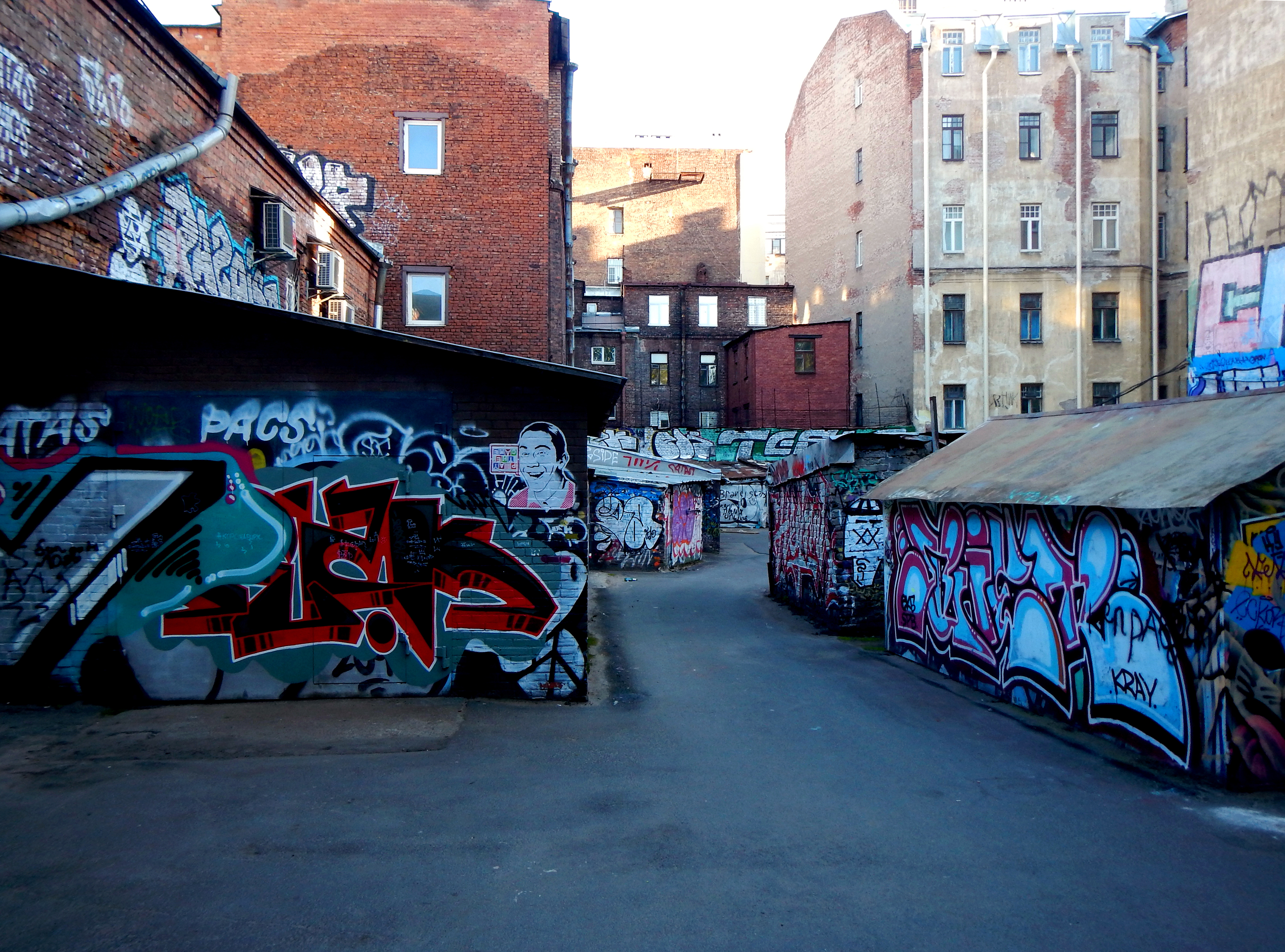

=== Old photos ===
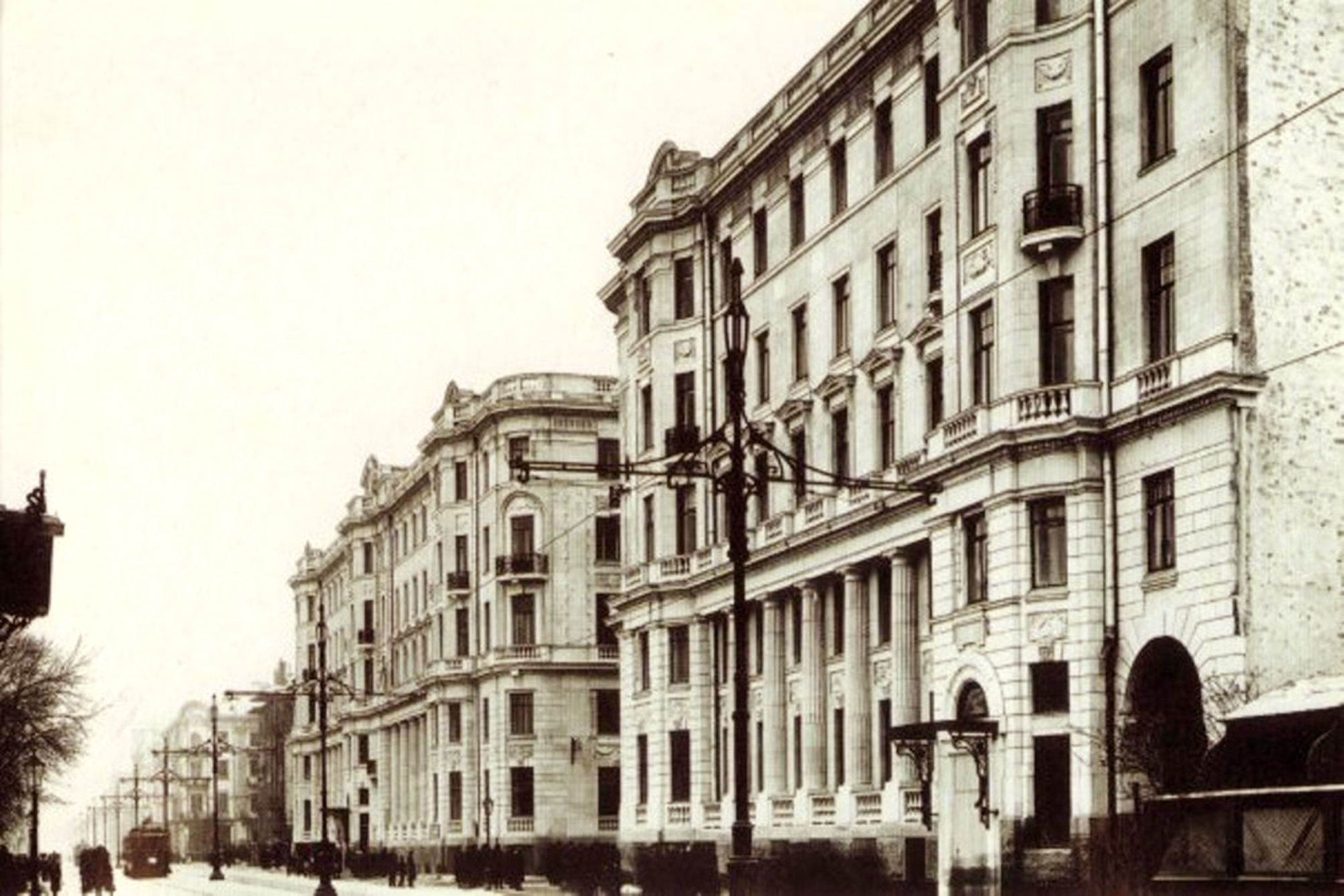

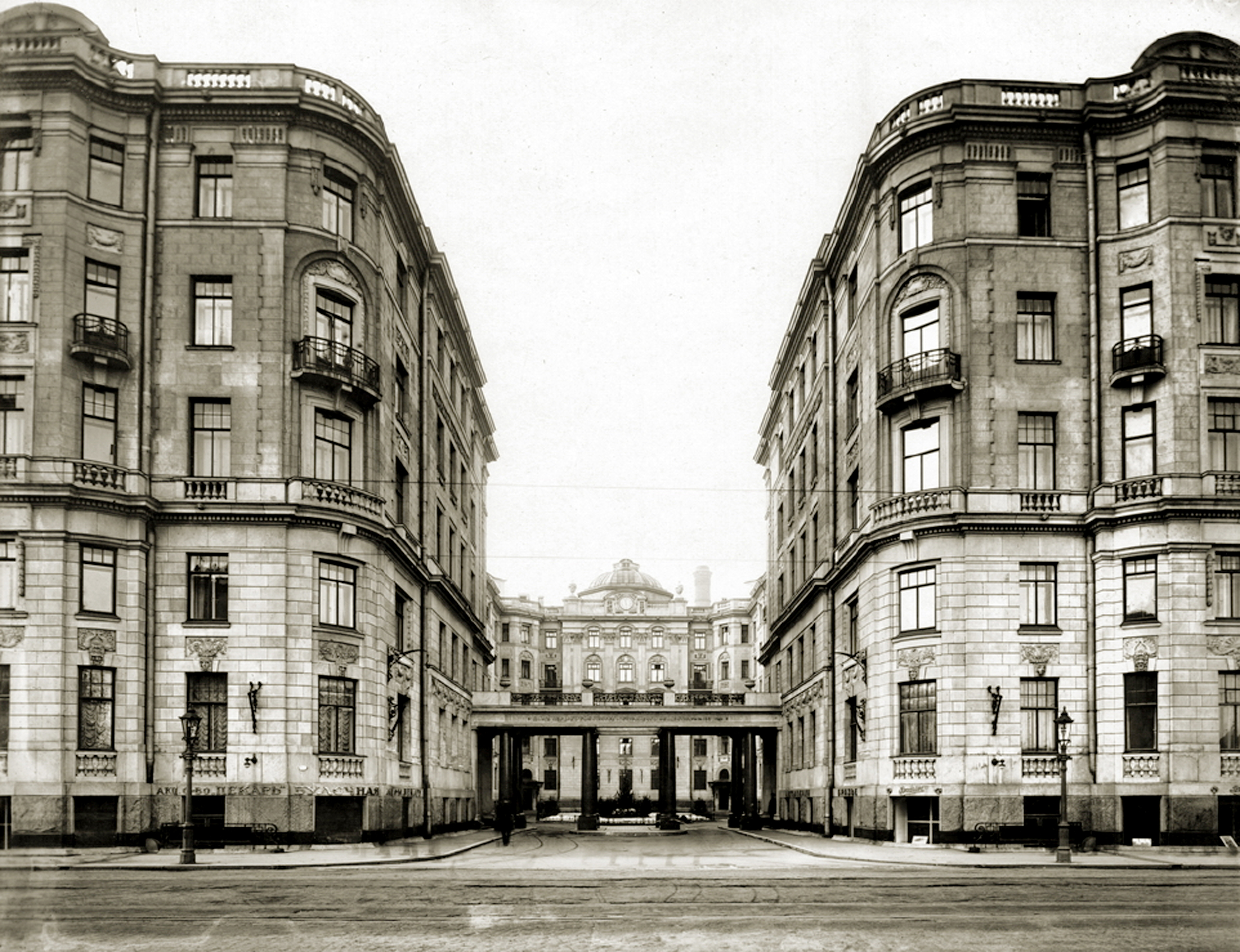

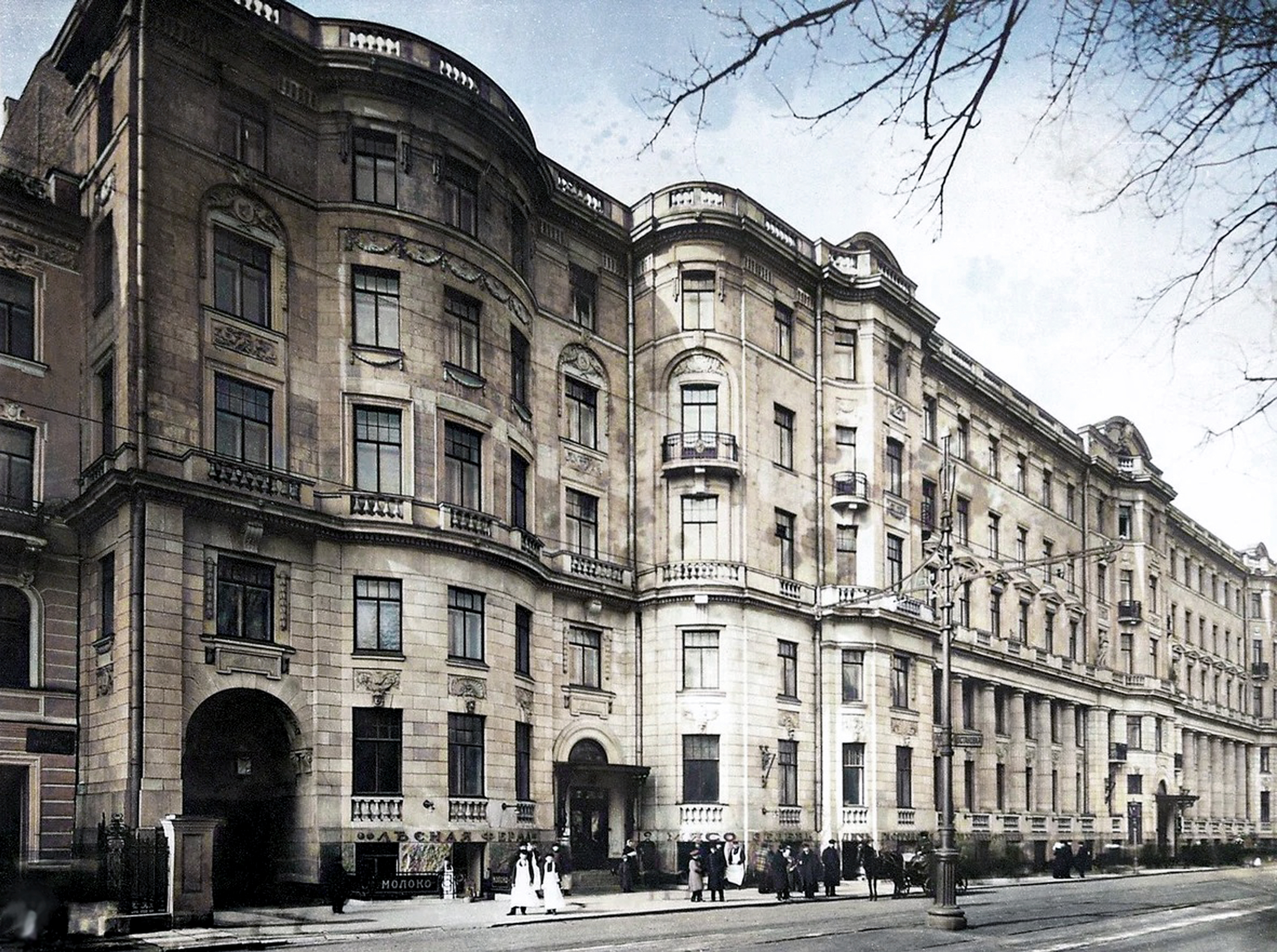

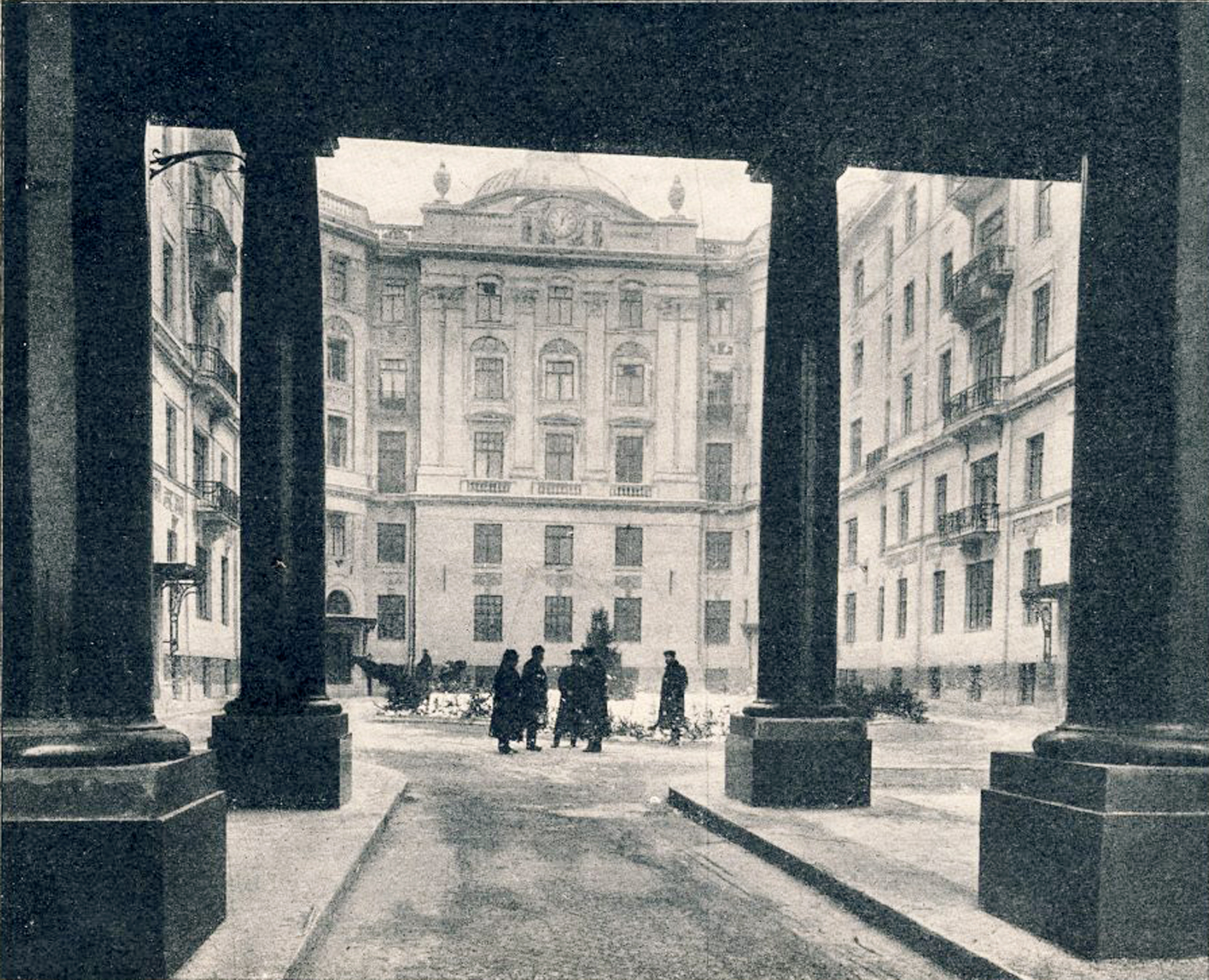
