= Vladimir Kachalsky =

Russian painter

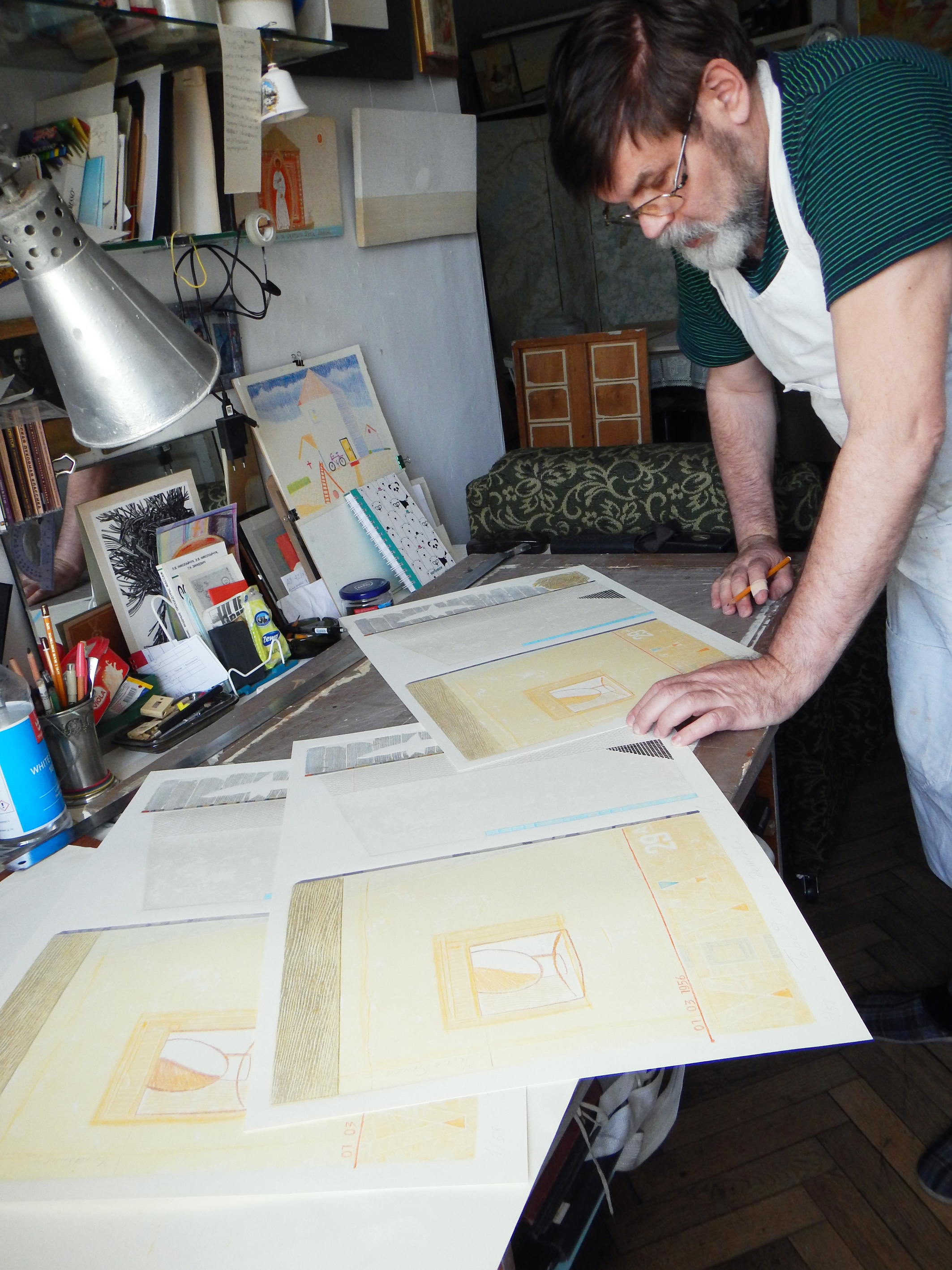
- Born: Vladimir Stanislavovich Kachalsky; March 1, 1956 (age 70); Chelyabinsk, Soviet Union
- Education: Imperial Academy of Arts
- Known for: Painting, Graphics
- Movement: arts

Vladimir Stanislavovich Kachalsky (Russian: Владимир Станиславович Качальский; born March 1, 1956) is a Soviet and Russian painter, graphic artist and printmaker, book artist, author of installations and sculptural objects.

== Biography ==
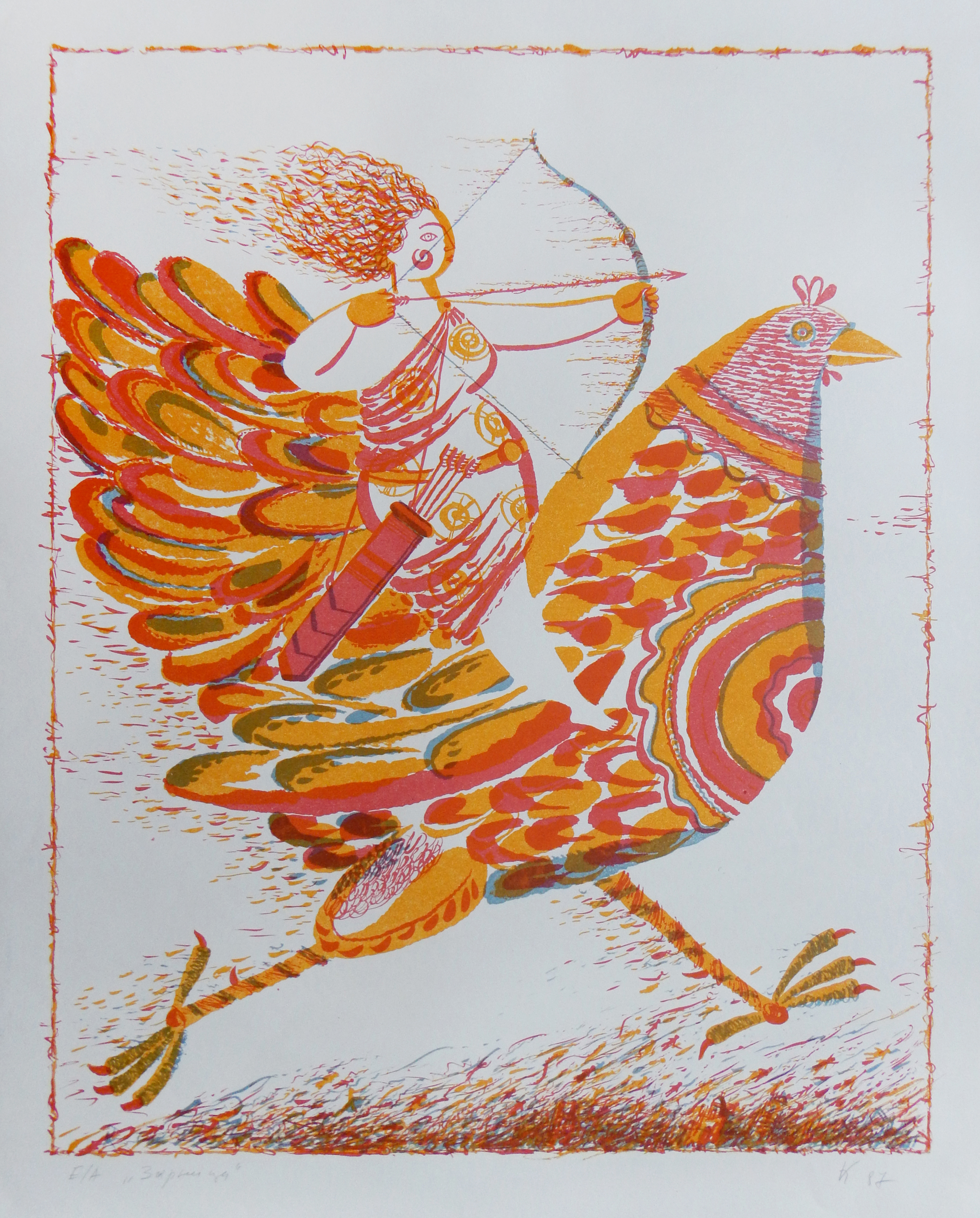
Zarnitsa. 1987, lithograph

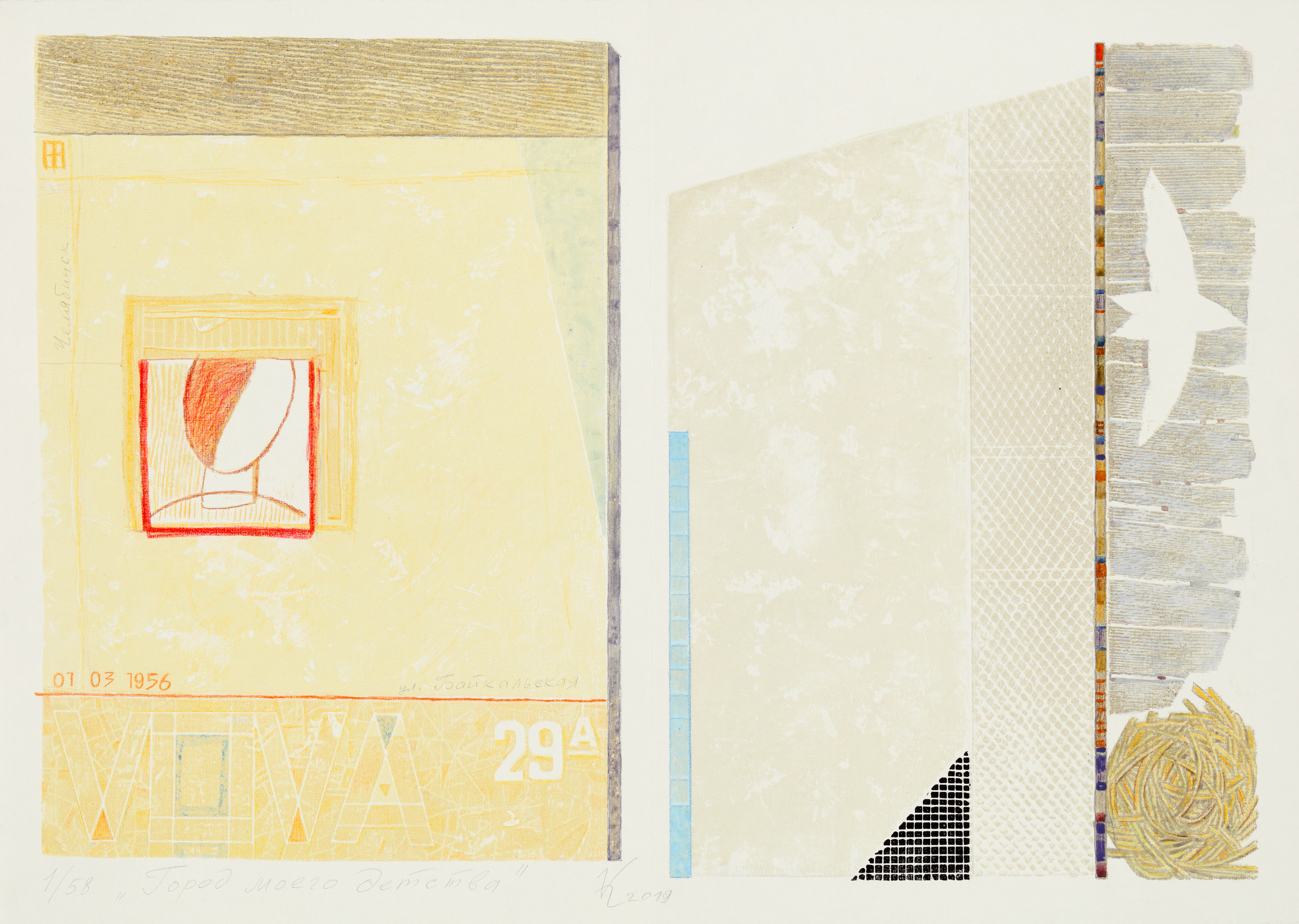
The Town of my Childhood (for the project City as an Artist's Subjectivity). 2019, mixed media

Studied in the studio under the guidance of Y. V. Dimakov (1962–1964). Studied in the studio of his father, artist S. B. Kachalsky; Secondary Art School named after Ioganson (1967–1974). Graduated from the Institute of Painting, Sculpture and Architecture named after I.Y. Repin, V. A. Vetrogonsky's studio (1979–1985). Member of Saint Petersburg Union of Artists (since 1990).

Over recent years, he has been occupied with private interior design, fresco wall painting, colour relief. The artist works in printed graphic technics: lithography, etching, serigraphy, and linocut.

Participant of numerous group exhibitions in Russia and abroad (since 1981). Including: Great Exhibition of the Land of Nord-Westphalia (Düsseldorf, Germany, 1989); ArtJunction (Nice, France, 1991); International Fair (Barcelona, Spain, 1991); Abu Dhabi (United Arab Emirates, 1992); Saint Petersburg today (Mandel, Stavanger, Norway, 1992); Irina Nevska Gallery (San Francisco, United States, 1994); Biennial of Graphic Art (Kaliningrad, 1992, 1994); Retrospective exhibition of Russian art (Zeeland, Domburg, Netherlands, 1994) Solo exhibitions: Intersot (1993); Saint Petersburg Union of Artists (1995); Chelyabinsk (1995). Project member: City as an Artist's Subjectivity (2020).

The artist lives and makes art in his workshop at the Benois House (Saint Petersburg), and in Tallinn since 2022 (Estonia).

== Museum collections ==
The artist's works are in the following museum collections/ State Catalogue of the Museum Fund of Russia:

- Hermitage Museum. Hermitage Academic Library/ Rare Books and Manuscripts Sector. (Saint Petersburg).
- Russian Museum. Department of engraving XVIII-XXI centuries. (Saint Petersburg)
- National Library of Russia. Department of Prints (Saint Petersburg)
- Pushkin Museum. Science Library/ Rare Books Dept. (Moscow)
- P.M. Dogadin Astrakhan State Art Gallery. (Astrakhan)
- Garage Museum of Contemporary Art. (Moscow). Library/ Artist's Books Dept.
- Mandal Museum (Mandal, Norway)
- Chelyabinsk State Museum of Fine Arts. (Chelyabinsk)
- Municipal Budgetary Institution Art Gallery. Republic of Tatarstan (Zelenodolsk).
- Museum-Reserve Shushenskoye. (Shushenskoye)

== Bibliography ==
- Parygin Alexey A City as an Artist's Subjectivity / Artist’s Book Yearbook 2022-2023. Edited by Sarah Bodman. — Bristol: CFPR (Centre for Fine Print Research). University of the West of England, 2022. — 292 pp. ISBN 978-1-906501-22-8
- Погарский М., Лукин В. Ф. Энциклопедия Книги художника. М. — 2022. цв. ил. — 296 с. — С. 164. ISBN 978-5-9906919-7-1
- Кононихин Н. Ленинградская школа литографии. Путь длиною в век. СПб: М. Frants Art Foundation. — 2021. — 360 с., цв. ил. ISBN 978-5-6046274-4-0
- Alexey Parygin A City as the Artist's Subjectivity // Book Arts Newsletter. — No. 140. Bristol: CFPR (Centre for Fine Print Research). University of the West of England, 2021, July–August. — pp. 46–48. ISSN 1754-9086
- Печатная графика Санкт-Петербургских художников // Каталог. Авт. вст. ст.: Н. Ю. Кононихин, А. Б. Парыгин. СПб: СПб СХ. — 2020. — 192 с., цв. ил. ISBN 978-5-6043891-1-9
- City as Artist's subjectivity. Artist's book project. Catalog. Authors of the articles: Parygin A.B., Markov T.A., Klimova E.D., Borovsky A.D., Severyukhin D.Ya., Grigoryants E.I., Blagodatov N.I. (Rus & En) — Saint Petersburg: Ed. T. Markova. 2020. — 128 p. ISBN 978-5-906281-32-6
- Рисунок Санкт-Петербургских художников / Каталог выставки в СПбСХ. Авт. вст. ст.: Л. Н. Вострецова. СПб: ООО Таро. — 2019. — 148 с., цв. ил. — С. 62.

== Gallery of works ==
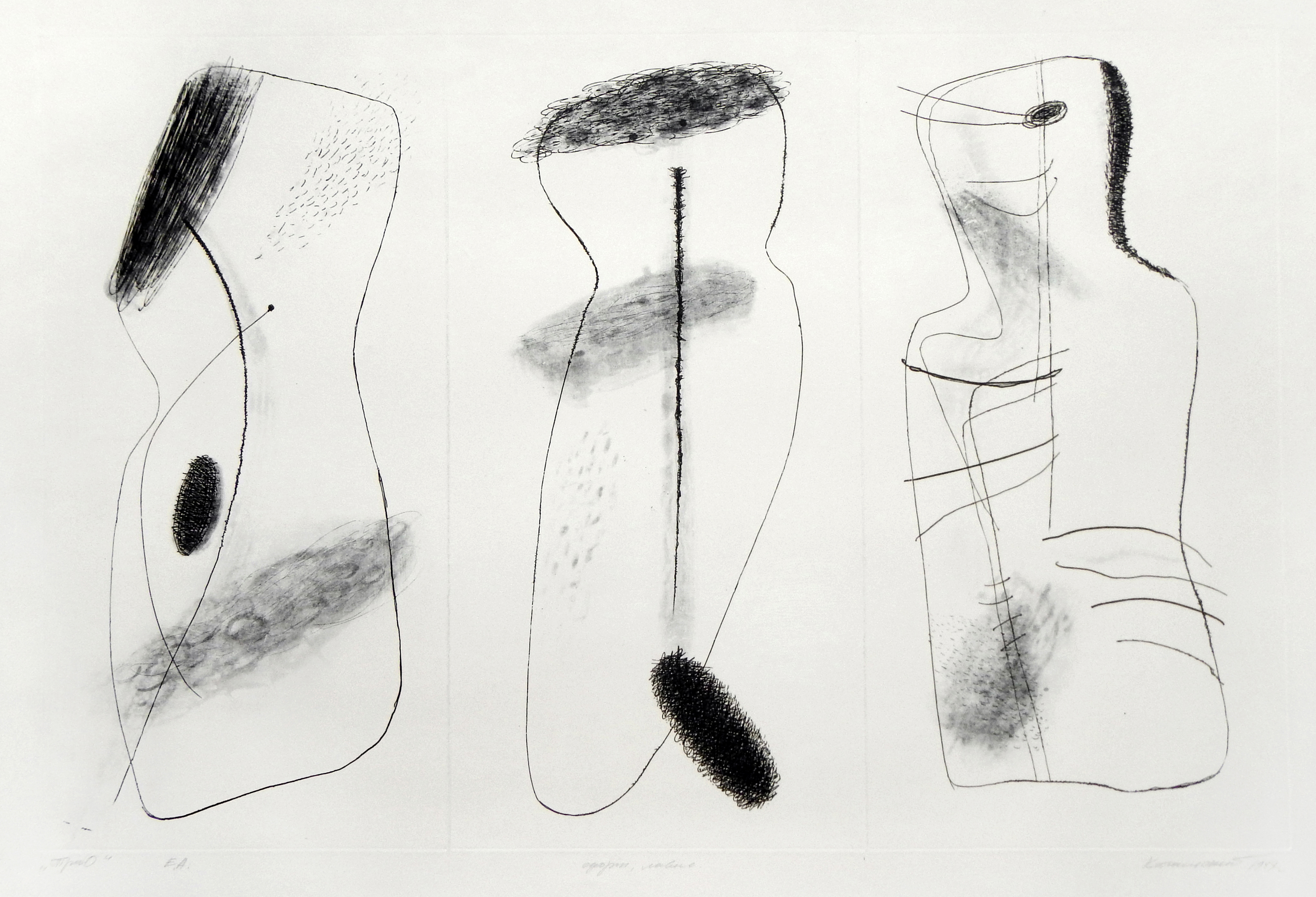

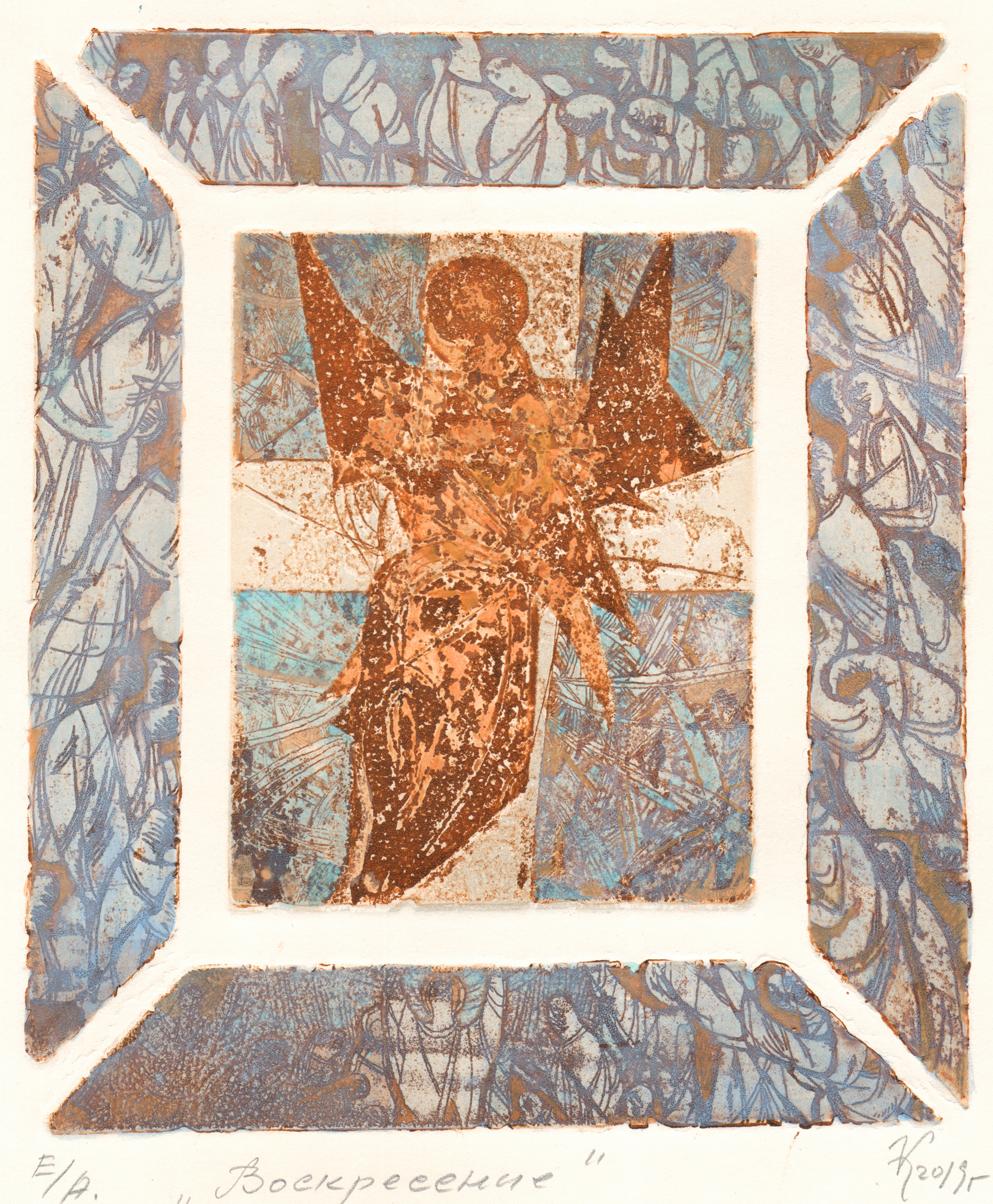

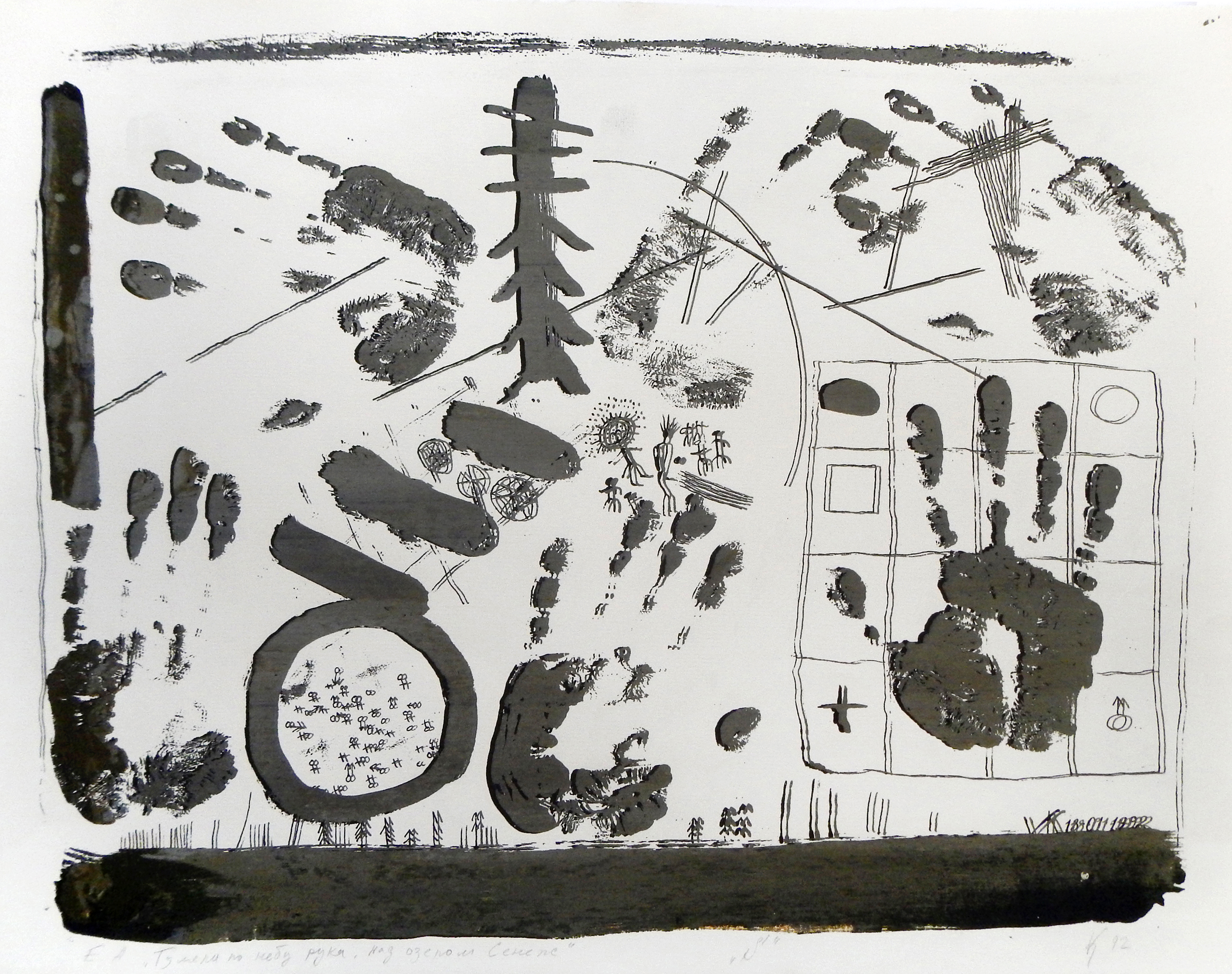
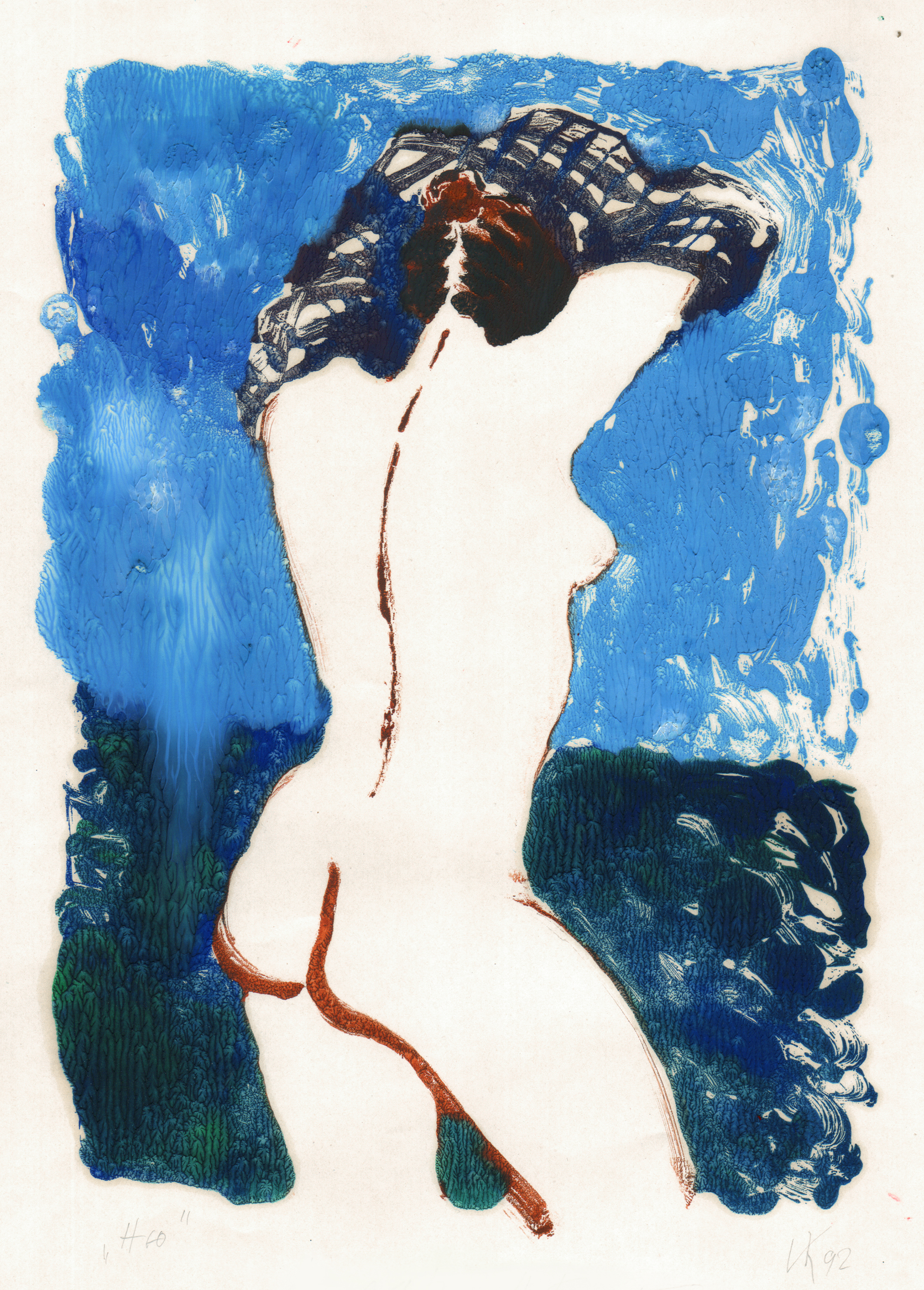

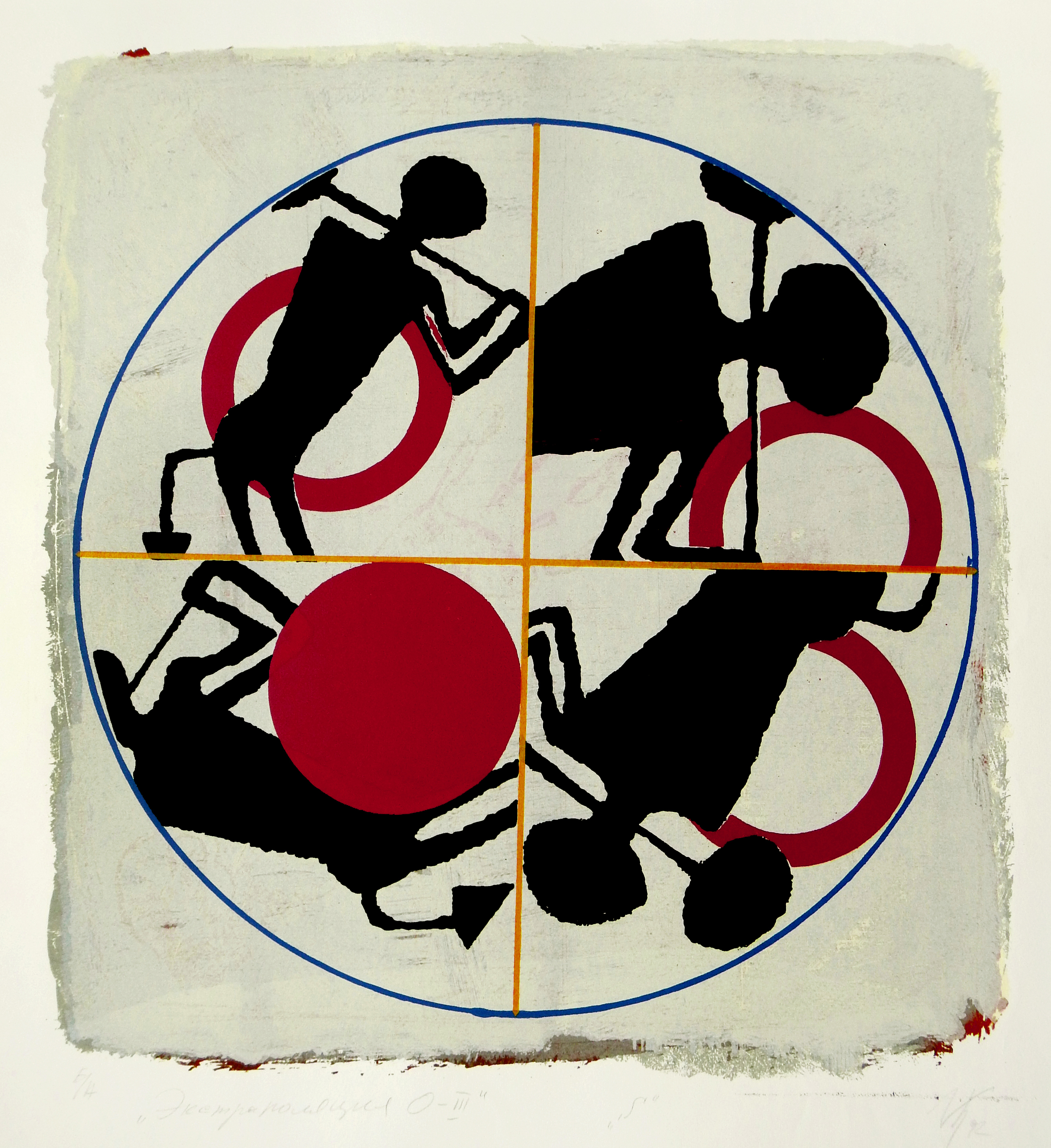

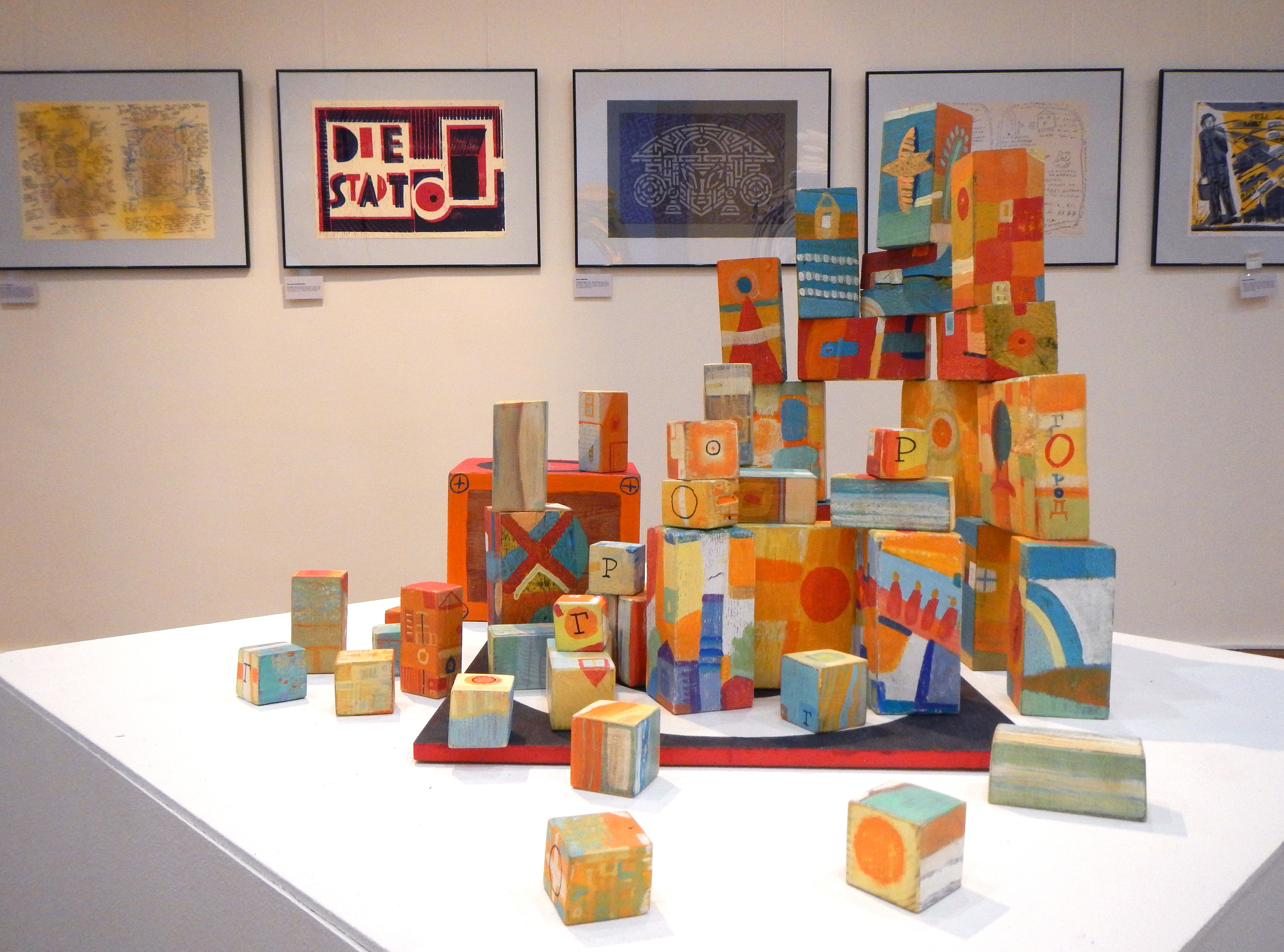
