= Ligovsky People's House =

- Лиговский Народный дом
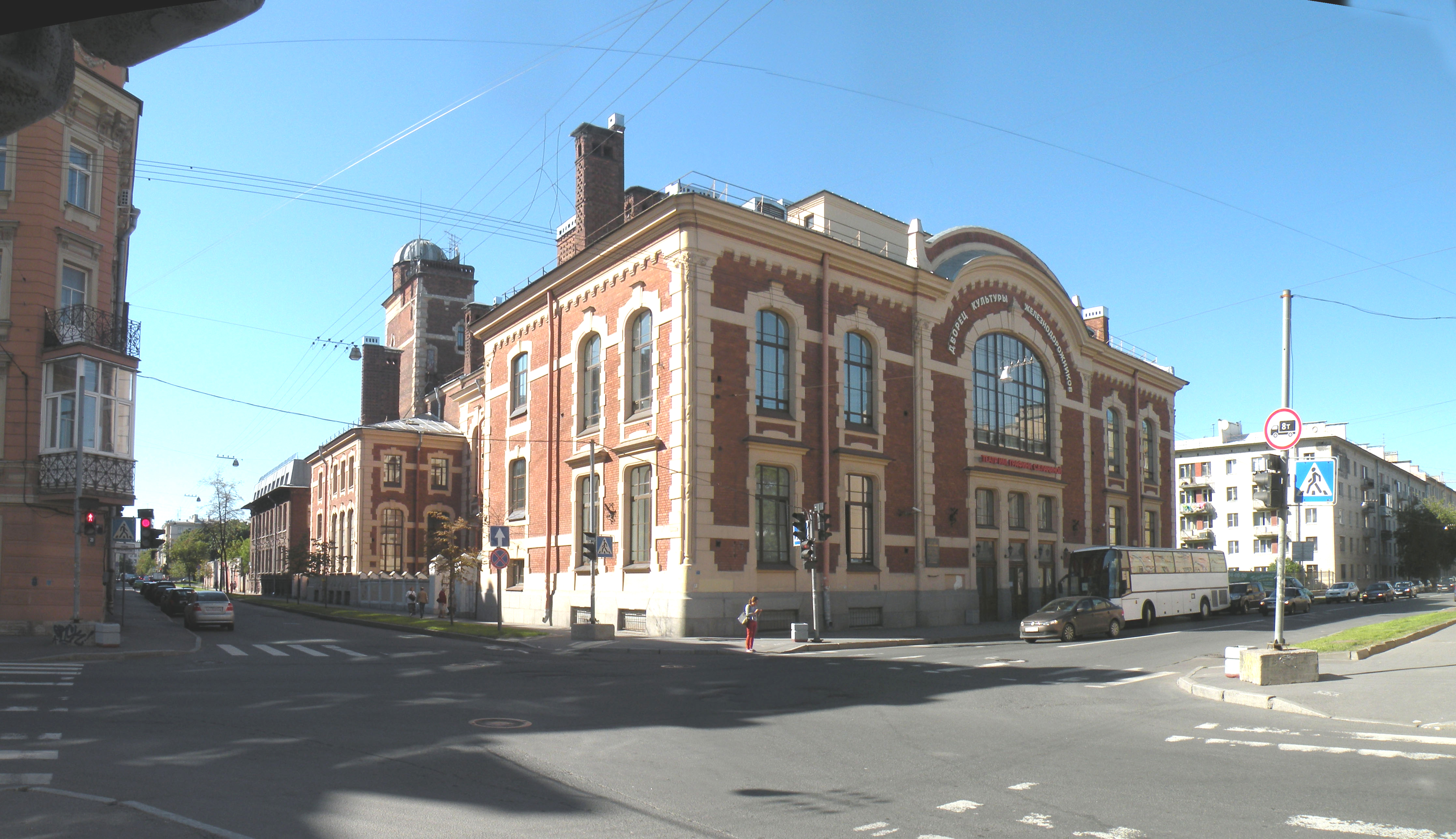
- Ligovsky People's House in April 2014
- Interactive map of the Ligovsky People's House area
- Former names: Railway Workers' Palace of Culture
- Alternative names: People's House of S. V. Panina

General information
- Location: Tambovskaya ul. 63, 192007 Sankt-Peterburg, Saint Petersburg, Russia
- Coordinates: 59.9094°N 30.3512°E
- Inaugurated: 1904

Design and construction
- Architect: Julius Benois
- Known for: Venue where Lenin addressed his first mass meeting on 9 May, 1906

The Ligovsky People's House was built in 1901–1903 at the expense of Countess Sofia Panina. It is located at the junction of Tambovskaya and Prilukskaya streets. It was one of a number of People's Houses created across Imperial Russia aimed at providing facilities for making art and cultural appreciation available to the working classes. Similar projects also appeared across Europe. The building also contained a theatre.

== Previous initiatives ==
Sofia Panina had been involved in a number of initiatives to support the local working class community: in 1891, she had helped create a free children's canteen in rented premises that were opened in the Alexander Nevsky District. Over the next decade, this developed into a teahouse with a library and facilities for evening educational classes for adults and children. In 1901, she provided the land for the People's House and launched a petition to Saint Petersburg City Council for permission to build the current building. When permission was granted, Julius Benois was engaged as the architect, and the building was completed in 1903.
