= Nikolai Kutler =

Russian politician (1859–1924)

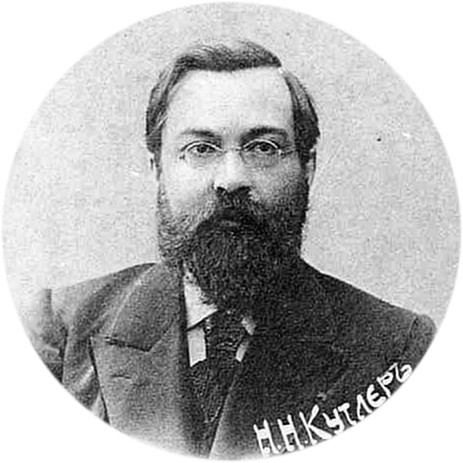
Nikolai Kutler.

Nikolai Nikolayevich Kutler (Russian: Никола́й Никола́евич Ку́тлер; 23 July 1859 – 10 May 1924) was a Russian politician.

== Biography ==
Assistant minister of the Interior, 1904–1905. Assistant minister of Finance, manager of Nobles' Land Bank and Peasants' Land Bank, 1905. Minister of Agriculture, 1905. Kutler resigned from his position when he was criticized for his project of compulsory alienation of private estates in February 1906 and joined Constitutional Democratic Party. He was elected member of 2nd and 3rd State Dumas and became one of its leading authorities on the agrarian question, replacing Mikhail Herzenstein, who was murdered by Black Hundreds.

After the Bolshevik revolution Kutler worked at the People's Commissariat of Finance and was State Bank of the USSR board member.
