= Julius Benois =

Russian architect (1852–1929)

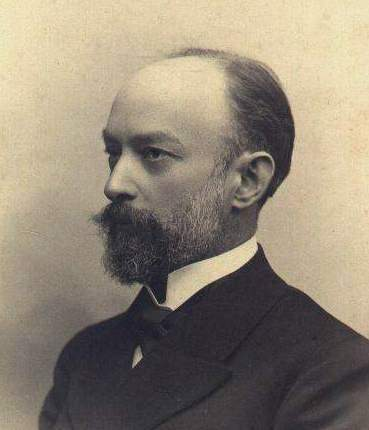
- Benois c. 1900
- Born: 25 February 1852; Saint Petersburg, Russia
- Died: 26 July 1929; Vologda, Soviet Union
- Occupation: Architect

Julius Yulyevich Benois (Russian: Юлий Юльевич Бенуа, romanized: Yuly Yulyevich Benua; (Note: Alternatively: Юлиус Юльевич Бенуа, Yulius Yulyevich Benua.) French: Jules-Louis-Auguste Benois; 25 February 1852 – 26 July 1929) was a Russian architect. He was a member of the Benois family.

Benois designed the Ligovsky People's House, close to the impoverished district of Ligovka in Saint Petersburg.
