= Aufbau-Vereinigung =

German-Russian far-right political organization

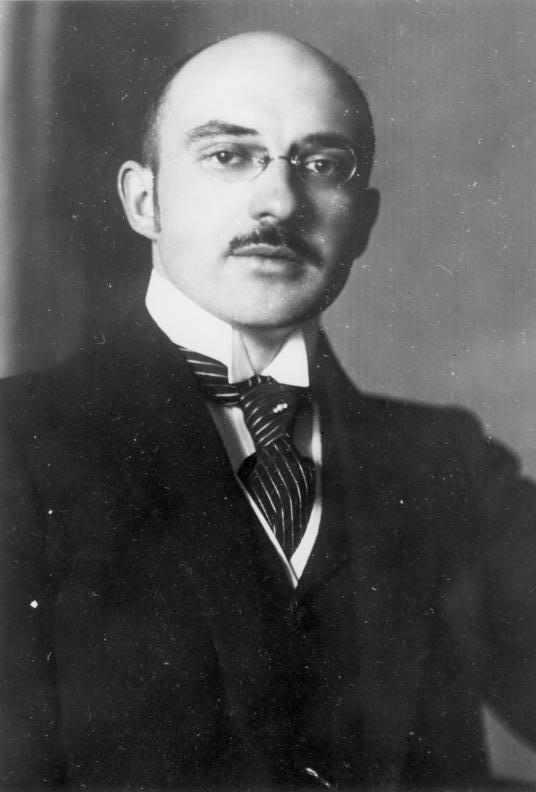
Max Erwin von Scheubner-Richter

The Wirtschaftliche Aufbau-Vereinigung (transl. Economic Reconstruction Organization) was a German-Russian conspiratorial group which was founded in Munich in 1920 and ceased to exist in 1924. Dedicated to the partnership of anti-Bolshevik völkisch Germans and Russian émigrés, the organization aimed to overthrow the Soviet Union and the Weimar Republic. The Aufbau-Vereinigung was led by Max Erwin von Scheubner-Richter, Vasily Biskupsky, and Alfred Rosenberg. Its membership and ideology overlapped with the early Nazi party; the degree to which the organization influenced later Nazi ideology is debated.

== History ==
=== Origins in Munich and founding ===
The interventions of the German forces in the lands of the Russian Empire during its disintegration, specifically the German occupation of Ukraine in 1918 and the Latvian Intervention of 1919, made the possibility of German-led military intervention against the Soviet Union a tangible possibility for many anti-Bolshevik Germans and White émigrés.

After the failure of the Kapp Putsch in Berlin in March 1920, many German and White Russian Kapp conspirators fled to Bavaria, then under the conservative governance of Gustav Ritter von Kahr, and re-established their right-wing networks in Munich. The White émigré community in Munich, numbering 1,105 at its 1921 peak, was extraordinarily exclusive, thanks to Bavarian state policy which allowed the existing émigré community to approve or reject the entry of any new White Russian émigrés to Munich. This resulted in a small, but homogeneously elite and deeply right-wing center of White power (unlike the more diverse émigré scene in Berlin).

Eminent members of the émigré and völkisch scenes in Munich sent a delegation under political writer Max Erwin von Scheubner-Richter, a Baltic German, to Pyotr Wrangel's then-headquarters in Crimea with the aim of establishing contact between Munich's völkisch scene and Wrangel's "Russian Army" and then negotiating terms of financial and military support for Wrangel in exchange for Ukrainian foodstuffs. Although the planned collaboration failed to materialize due to the unexpectedly quick defeat of Wrangel, it inspired the creation of an organization which would link radical German and émigré Russian conservatives in an organization opposed to "the Entente, the Weimar Republic, Jewry, and Bolshevism."

Scheubner-Richter began organizing the Wirtschaftliche Aufbau-Vereinigung following his return from Crimea in October 1920 with the help of key figures in Munich's völkisch and émigré scene, especially Vasily Biskupsky. The organization's goals, while resolutely anti-Bolshevik, were sufficiently vague to include imperialist "Great Russians" and members of minorities, such as Ukrainians and Germans, who would prefer a reconstitution of the pre-revolutionary order on more nationalist terms. Thus, the organization was nominally monarchistic, but also strongly represented Ukrainian nationalist interests. Membership was tightly controlled and required the payment of 100,000 ℳ︁ to the organization, not including steep membership dues. Members were thoroughly vetted in order to confirm sufficient commitment to the anti-Bolshevik cause. Many of the organization's wealthy industrialist members joined with the expectation that they would be afforded profitable concessions in a post-Bolshevik Russia in exchange for their financial support of the White cause (hence the inclusion of Wirtschaftlich, economic or financial, in the Aufbau-Vereinigung's name).

Theodor von Cramer-Klett Jr., an industrial magnate and the son of Theodor von Cramer-Klett, was made president of the organization, largely due to his lavish financial support for it. However, Scheubner-Richter remained the organization's actual leader. General Biskupsky was vice-president, and the key ally of Scheubner-Richter in leadership. Among others, the future top Nazi functionaries Alfred Rosenberg and Arno Schickedanz served as officers; Rosenberg introduced Scheubner-Richter to Adolf Hitler in November 1920. Scheubner-Richter was deeply impressed by Hitler and quickly joined his NSDAP. Scheubner-Richter would attract Erich Ludendorff to the organization and allegedly introduced him to Hitler under the auspices of the Aufbau-Vereinigung in March 1921.

=== Monarchism ===
The Aufbau-Vereinigung was further energized by collaboration with the Munich-based Deutsch-Russische Gesellschaft (German-Russian Society) which began in April 1921. The Aufbau-Vereinigung quickly took over management of the organization, which would become known as Erneuerung: Neue Deutsch-Russländische Gesellschaft (Renewal: New German-Russian Society). Contrary to the secretive Aufbau-Vereinigung, the Society's membership was free and popular, and was more closely connected with the pro-Grand Duke Kirill faction of mainstream Russian monarchism. The Society's support of Kirill would make him the Aufbau-Vereinigung's preferred candidate for the Russian throne.

In May and June 1921, the organization put on a Monarchical Congress in Bad Reichenhall which was meant to coalesce the disparate strains of the monarchist White movement into a united alliance with Nazism and for swift anti-Bolshevik action. It had over 100 prominent White Russian attendants from across Europe, Asia and America. While the organization of the Congress was a publicity coup for Scheubner-Richter, disagreements pertaining to the post-Bolshevik structure of Russia scuttled the goal of German-Russian pro-Nazi collaboration: the Aufbau-Vereinigung and its allies supported a pro-German Russian monarchy allied with autonomous Baltic and Ukrainian states, while more hardline factions remained pro-French and resistant to anything less than an imperialist "Great Russia". The former faction, led by the Aufbau-Vereinigung at the Congress, maintained support for Kirill, while the latter faction supported Paris-based Grand Duke Nicholas Nikolaevich's ascent to a post-Bolshevik Russian throne.

Scheubner-Richter's pro-Kirill and pro-Ukrainian stance would be a persistent stumbling block in his efforts to unify different White factions outside of Bavaria, but Scheubner-Richter made headway in Hungary following an October 1921 visit. The Aufbau-Vereinigung was "ostentatiously" refounded in the same month, with more prominence given to Ludendorff, and the organization founded an anti-Bolshevik intelligence service, "Project S", under Walter Nicolai. Aufbau gained steam through late 1921 and early 1922, founding a trade organization with 6,000,000 ℳ︁ (raised from German and White Russian backers) in capital which ultimately aimed to fund an overthrow of Bolshevik rule in Ukraine, in the meantime generating funds for that cause. Scheubner-Richter ramped up the organization's pro-Kirill activities, and Grand Duke Kirill and his wife finally moved to Bavaria in August 1922.

Splits between the pro-German, pro-Kirill and pro-French, pro-Nicholas factions deepened in late 1922 and early 1923, as rumors of a French-led and Polish and Romanian-aided intervention in the Soviet Union swirled. Scheubner-Richter derided the pro-French faction as Jewish, and entertained a temporary, strategic alliance between pro-Kirill forces and the Red Army should pro-French forces invade the Soviet Union. Aside from its principal goals of intervention in the Soviet Union via Ukraine and the Baltics, the Aufbau-Vereinigung also formulated strategies to reintroduce the pre-1918 monarchies in Germany and Austria-Hungary. The organization also made connections with anti-communist groups within the Soviet Union which, it was hoped, could stage internal revolts to complement the aforementioned White interventions in the west.

=== Actions ===
The Aufbau-Vereinigung's increasing activity included engagement with other far-right German forces other than the Nazi Party, including Organisation Consul. Pyotr Shabelsky-Bork and Sergey Taboritsky, two close associates of General Biskupsky, accidentally killed prominent émigré Vladimir Dmitrievich Nabokov while attempting to kill Constitutional Democratic leader Pavel Milyukov. Biskupsky and Max Bauer, a protege of Ludendorff, also formulated plans to assassinate Alexander Kerensky, which never materialized. Bauer, along with Biskupsky and Ludendorff, may have collaborated with Organisation Consul in the June 1922 attempt on Philipp Scheidemann's life and the successful assassination of Walther Rathenau. Organisation Consul was close to the Nazi Party, and some of its members were connected to, or at least voiced support for, the White Russian cause (see Freikorps in the Baltic).

The Aufbau-Vereinigung did not lose sight of its ultimate goal of the overthrow of the Bolsheviks in Russia. In April 1923, Soviet authorities in Kyiv made arrests in connection to the discovery of a trove of White propaganda, much of it written by Kirill, the printing of which had been assisted by Aufbau agents. The organization, perhaps in collaboration with early Nazi figures such as Ernst Röhm, also trained some East Galician Ukrainian nationalists in Germany, with the goal of releasing them as insurgents in Ukraine. Ivan Poltavets'-Ostrianytsia, the most prominent Ukrainian in the organization, hoped to become Hetman an independent Ukrainian state under the auspices of the Aufbau-Vereinigung.

=== Collaboration with Nazi Party and the Beer Hall Putsch ===
Starting in late 1922 and into 1923, Scheubner-Richter became a key advisor to Adolf Hitler. He shared Hitler's belief that immediate, violent action was necessary to save Germany, and indeed Europe, from what he termed "the abyss". The seizure of power by the Fascist Party in Italy after Benito Mussolini's March on Rome provided particular inspiration to Scheubner-Richter's hope of a coup which would begin in Bavaria and later seize control of Germany. Concurrently, Ludendorff became a major advocate for the Nazi Party, viewing it as the most dynamic and decisive force within the völkisch movement.

In January 1923, the Nazi Party, along with other far-right organizations, held a rally featuring Scheubner-Richter and Ludendorff in protest of the Frenco-Belgian occupation of the Ruhr. In May, Kirill paid Ludendorff 500,000 ℳ︁ for "German-Russian national matters" as articulated by the Aufbau-Vereinigung, with the assurance that the money would be paid back once Ludendorff had assumed power (allegedly, a significant portion of this payment was provided was provided by Henry Ford via Boris Brasol, an Aufbau member based in New York). Scheubner-Richter and Biskupsky went about extensive fundraising for the Nazi party in spring and summer 1923, soliciting donations in particular from émigrés who they had met through the Aufbau-Vereinigung.

In September, the decentralized Arbeitsgemeinschaft, an umbrella organization of Bavarian right-wing groups founded in January, disintegrated. Already planning a move for power, Hitler decided to reconstitute a smaller, but more centralized combat organization, the Kampfgruppe (Combat Group) which included the SA, the Bund Oberland, and the Bund Reichskriegsflagge. Hitler made Scheubner-Richter its general manager, and thus his representative in the group. Tensions with the Kahr government worsened, and on November 8, 1923, Scheubner-Richter advised Hitler to move immediately. He accompanied Hitler to the Bürgerbräukeller, where the abortive Beer Hall Putsch was launched.

Scheubner-Richter was killed during the Putsch, becoming Nazism's first great martyr. The failure of the Putsch resulted in a temporary period of disarray for the German right. Some émigrés associated with the Putsch via the Aufbau-Vereinigung, including Fyodor Vinberg, fled Germany. More importantly, Scheubner-Richter had been the guiding figure of the organization and völkisch-White Russian collaboration writ large. Scheubner-Richter was much eulogized by his émigré comrades within the Aufbau-Vereinigung. Biskupsky was immediately subject to investigation due to his links to the Putsch, leaving the organization in the hands of Otto von Kursell, who continued to publish the organization's journal until June 1924 but whose tenure otherwise saw the disintegration of the organization. Thus, the Aufbau-Vereinigung effectively ceased to exist as an organization with the death of Scheubner-Richter. In the period after the Putsch, notions of Lebensraum and Slavic inferiority, naturally unpopular with Russians, gained a stronger hold on the Nazi movement.

== The question of influence ==
In 2005, Cambridge University Press published The Russian Roots of Nazism: White Émigrés and the Making of National Socialism, a book by independent researcher Michael Kellogg extensively utilizing sources from the Russian Federal Archives which were made available to researchers in the wake of the fall of the Soviet Union. The Russian Roots of Nazism remains the most significant and detailed treatment of the Aufbau-Vereinigung to date. Kellogg charges that, beyond shared personnel and a common milieu, the White Émigré community in general and the Aufbau-Vereinigung in particular had massive, mostly unexamined influence on the early Nazi Party.

In his book, Kellogg claims White Russians and the Aufbau-Vereinigung introduced the idea of Jewish Bolshevism (if not a fear of Bolshevism itself) and an apocalyptic worldview to the Nazi Party, where these had not previously been present. To varying degrees, Kellogg traces many later phenomena in Nazi Germany, including the Holocaust, to the Aufbau-Vereinigung's long-term influence. Hitler's decision to divert troops away from Moscow towards Ukraine in 1941, for instance, is attributed to the Aufbau-Vereinigung's much earlier hopes that the Soviet Union would be overthrown through Ukraine and the Baltics.

Kellogg's revisionist claims were criticized by some reviewers, who critiqued Kellogg's methods and pointed out that antibolshevism, antisemitism, and apocalypticism were present in Nazism's German predecessors long before the Russian Revolution. Reviewers also noted a number of factual errors in the book. Other reviewers received the book more positively, while still critically noting its wide-reaching and, at times, factually incorrect conclusions.

== Membership ==
The membership of the Aufbau-Vereinigung is difficult to ascertain due to the organization's secrecy. According to Kellogg, membership included the following:

- Max Erwin von Scheubner-Richter, Arno Schickedanz, Alfred Rosenberg, and Otto von Kursell were all Baltic Germans and core members of the Aufbau-Vereinigung who would also join the Nazi party. All four attended the Riga Polytechnic Institute and were members of the Rubonia fraternity there.
- General Vasily Biskupsky, a commander of the West Russian Volunteer Army and wealthy oil prospector, founded the Aufbau-Vereinigung with Scheubner-Richter. He went on to become a crucial intermediary between Hitler and Russians resident in Germany, but was eventually sidelined by the Nazi regime.
- Max Amann, a native of Munich who went on to attain high rank in the SS.
- Fyodor Vinberg, a Russian officer of German descent, was one of the Kapp conspirators who moved to Munich in 1920. He became a leading member of the Aufbau-Vereinigung and correspondent of Adolf Hitler.
- Pyotr Shabelsky-Bork, also a Russian officer, was affiliated with Vinberg, was a prominent propagator of the Protocols of the Elders of Zion, and accidentally killed Vladimir Dmitrievich Nabakov along with fellow Aufbau-Vereinigung member Sergey Taboritsky, a journalist.
- General Konstantin Sakharov, who was Chief of Staff to Alexander Kolchak, had long been sympathetic to Germany, and acted as a crucial intermediary between Grand Duke Kirill and others, and corresponded with Hitler after the Beer Hall Putsch.
- Erich Ludendorff, one of the most prominent German commanders of the First World War, was brought into the Aufbau-Vereinigung after its founding by Scheubner-Richter. According to Kellogg, his fruitful relationship with Hitler was made through the organization. Ludendorff's aide, Max Bauer, also joined, and was implicated in several terrorist acts connected with the organization.
- Boris Brasol, a Russian émigré based in New York, allegedly provided the Aufbau-Vereinigung with generous funding from Henry Ford.
- Ivan Poltavets'-Ostrianytsia, a Ukrainian of Cossack descent, was general chancellor of the Ukrainian State, and was a prominent pro-Ukrainian voice in the organization.
- While it is unknown whether Dietrich Eckart was a member of the Aufbau-Vereinigung, he maintained close contact with Rosenberg and Kursell and wrote of the organization's activities approvingly

== See also ==
- Thule Society, another secretive Munich-based organization of which Alfred Rosenberg was also a member

== Bibliography ==
- Kellogg, Michael (2005), The Russian Roots of Nazism: White Émigrés and the Making of National Socialism, 1917–1945 (PDF), Cambridge: Cambridge University Press, archived from the original (PDF) on 1 April 2025
- Laqueur, Walter (1965), Russia and Germany: A Century of Conflict, London: Weidenfeld & Nicolson
