= Vasily Biskupsky =

Russian general

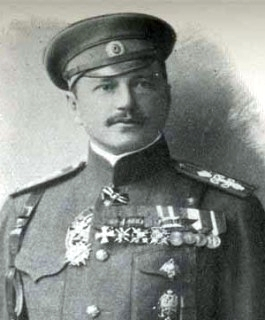
Biskupsky in 1915

Vasily Viktorovich Biskupsky (Russian: Василий Викторович Бискупский; Ukrainian: Василь Вікторович Біскупський; 27 June 1878 – 17 June 1945) was a general in the Russian and Ukrainian armies who, while in exile in Germany, helped finance Adolf Hitler's rise to power.

Biskupsky's father was the vice-governor of Tomsk. Vasily was forced to leave the Russian Imperial Army after his secret marriage to operetta singer Anastasia Vyaltseva had been made public. He bought lands in the Russian Far East and Sakhalin Island and started drilling for oil. After World War I had broken out, Biskupsky returned to the army and was promoted to major general in June 1916.

After the Russian Revolution, Pavlo Skoropadskyi put Biskupsky in charge of the military forces of the Central Council of Ukraine. In 1918, he surrendered Odessa to Nykyfor Hryhoriv's forces. He also was a leading member of the short-lived West Russian Volunteer Army before emigrating to Germany in 1919.

After selling his Sakhalin property to the Japanese government, Biskupsky became a rich man. He was one of the first Russians to give unqualified support to Hitler (whom he claimed to have concealed in his own apartment after the failed Beer Hall Putsch). Biskupsky was also involved in the Kapp Putsch. In 1921, he placed a contract for the assassination of Alexander Kerensky, blaming him for undermining the Russian Empire. However, he was unable to bring about his assassination.

In 1922, Biskupsky's associates Taboritsky and Shabelsky-Bork attempted to kill Paul Miliukov, a major liberal leader. Although the assassins missed their target, they accidentally shot and killed Vladimir Dmitrievich Nabokov, the writer's father.

Some historians believe that Biskupsky helped channel Romanov money to the Nazi Party. Indeed, he was deeply involved in ultra-right émigré politics and made numerous attempts to capitalize on his earlier experience in the Aufbau (Economic-Political Society for Aid to the East) - an office which he had founded, in which the future top Nazi functionaries Alfred Rosenberg and Arno Schickedanz would serve for a time. In 1936, Hitler put him in charge of the Russische Vertrauensstelle, a government body dealing with the Russian émigré community. By the end of World War II, he had grown disillusioned with Hitler. He was sacked and briefly imprisoned by the NSDAP.
