= Elizaveta Shabelskaya-Bork =

Russian writer (1855–1917)

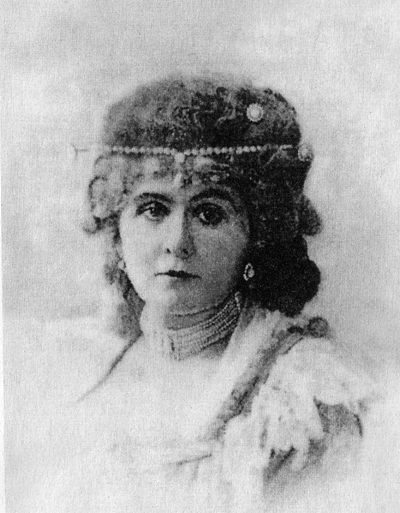
- Born: Elizaveta Aleksandrovna Shabelskaya; 1855; Russian Empire
- Died: 17 August 1917 (aged 61–62); Novgorod Governorate, Russian Empire
- Occupations: Writer, actress and entrepreneur

Elizaveta Aleksandrovna Shabelskaya-Bork (Russian: Елизавета Александровна Шабельская-Борк, 1855 – August 15, 1917) was a writer, actress and entrepreneur in the Russian Empire.

== Biography ==
Shabelskaya-Bork was born into a noble family of the Russian Empire's Kharkov Governorate.

She lived in Germany for much of her life. Around 1903, she married A.N. Bork, after whom she took the name Shabelskaya-Bork. Around the age of thirty, she acquired literary fame, but greater widespread recognition only came with the publication of the novel Satanisty XX veka (Satanists of the 20th Century) (published 1913; reprinted 1934, 2000, 2004, 2011).

In 1902, Shabelskaya was accused by her former lover, the Minister of Finance Vladimir Kovalevsky, for forgery of bills in his name totaling 120 thousand rubles. In 1903, calligraphic examination confirmed that the bills were counterfeit. However, Shabelskaya insisted on transferring the case from a commercial court to a criminal one. The defense of Shabelskaya was led by the attorney Sergey Margolin. On November 23, 1905, E. A. Shabelskaya was declared acquitted in court. The civil lawsuit filed in the amount of 120,000 rubles by Privy Councilor Kovalevsky was left without consideration. Subsequently, Shabelskaya released the novel Vekselya anterprinyorshi (Promissory Notes of an Entrepreneur), based on the materials of the case.

After the 1905 Russian Revolution, she became an ideological monarchist, supporting the mass monarchist Black Hundreds movement. She worked for about seven years in the Russkoe znamya, the newspaper of the Main Council of the Union of the Russian People (URP), working closely with Alexander Dubrovin.

At the end of 1913, she left the newspaper due to a personal conflict with Poluboyarinova.

Shabelskaya-Bork died on August 15, 1917, at 10 a.m. in the Sust-Zareche estate of the Novgorod Governorate after a long illness. Around April 1922, Alexander Amfiteatrov wrote memoirs about her similar to an obituary.

Officer Pyotr Shabelsky-Bork, who took the pseudonym in honor of Shabelskaya-Bork (real name Popov, pseudonym Srariy Kiribey), participated in the assassination attempt on Pavel Milyukov in March 1922. The conspiracy led to the death of Vladimir Dmitrievich Nabokov, the father of the famous writer Vladimir Nabokov. Popov claimed to be the godson of Shabelskaya-Bork, although he actually only met her in 1916.

== Books ==
- The novel Vekselya anterprinyorshi. SPb: Type. V.A. Tikhanova, 1907.
- The novel Satanisty XX veka. M.: FERI-V, 2000. ISBN 5-94138-005-4; M.: FERI-V, М.: FERI-V, 2004. ISBN 5-94138-019-4; M.: Algorithm, 2011. ISBN 978-5-9265-0753-6.
- The novel Krasnye i chyornye (Red and Black). Three parts. SPb.: Publ. Newspaper «Russkoe znamya», 1911–1913.

== Notes ==
- Сатанисты XX века
- Влас Михайлович Дорошевич. «Вий. Петербургское предание»
