= Sergey Taboritsky =

Russian journalist (1897–1980)

- Сергей Таборицкий
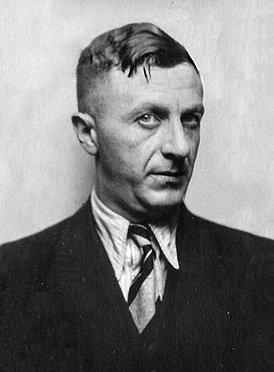
- Photograph of Taboritsky, c. 1937
- Born: 12 August 1897; St. Petersburg, Russian Empire
- Died: 16 October 1980 (aged 83); Limburg an der Lahn, West Germany
- Occupation: Journalist
- Political party: Nazi Party (1942–1945)

Sergey Vladimirovich Taboritsky (Russian: Сергей Владимирович Таборицкий; 12 August 1897 – 16 October 1980) was a Russian journalist, known for his nationalist, monarchist, and antisemitic positions. In 1922, he unsuccessfully attempted to assassinate politician Pavel Milyukov. He served as the deputy of the Bureau for Russian Refugees in Germany from 1936 to 1945. In 1942, Taboritsky became a member of the Nazi Party, and he directly collaborated with the Gestapo.

He fled Berlin at the end of World War II, and lived the rest of his life within West Germany until his death in 1980.

== Biography ==
=== Early years ===
Sergey and his younger brother, Nikolay Taborisky (the spelling of his name at the beginning of the twentieth century was inconsistent; during the emigration years, the "Taboritsky" variant was used) were the illegitimate children of Anna Vladimirovna and her cohabitant, Sergey Alexandrovich Zapevalov (who broke up with her in 1901). His mother was a baptized Jewish tailor and owner of a fashion shop. Both brothers were raised as Orthodox Christians. Taboritsky's godfather was the future Ober-Procurator Vladimir Sabler.

The brothers had the surname of Anna Vladimirovna's first husband, also Jewish, Wulf Aizikovich Taborissky, a tradesman from Ashmyany, who had left the country long before both of them were born, in 1887. According to the documents, they were regarded as the children of Wulf Taborissky, since the first divorce of their mother occurred only in 1899. The mother became a second guild merchant and married a noble named Marasanov, taking his surname. Anna Marasanova died in March 1914 in France.

In 1915, after their mother's death, Sergey and Nikolay unsuccessfully tried to reach the Petrograd Spiritual Consistory with a plea to recognise them as the children of the "Russian Orthodox person" and rid them of the "Cain's seal", citing their religious and monarchist sentiments.

He graduated from the Realschule of Gurevich in 1915. There were later stories that Taboritsky participated in World War I fighting under the command of Grand Duke Michael Alexandrovich as part of the Caucasian Native Cavalry Division, but the reports can't be considered as reliable. According to some reports, he was an assistant to the commissioner from the State Duma and deputy Georgy Derugin during this time.

In 1917 a man named Fyodor Vinberg met Pyotr Shabelsky-Bork in a Bolshevik prison in Petrograd, a year later he met Taboritsky in a Bolshevik prison in Kiev. After all three fled to the Weimar Republic, Vinberg became a mentor to Shabelsky-Bork and Taboritsky and he would give them orders which they would carry out on his behalf. Vinberg preferred to keep his political involvement in the shadows, so when he began publishing his far-right magazine "Ray of Light" he had Taboritsky take credit for the first two articles it as editor and had Bork sign as the editor of the third edition, which was a re-print of The Protocols of the Elders of Zion.

=== Emigration ===
At first, Taboritsky lived in Berlin, then in Mecklenburg, and from January to March 1922 in Munich. While in Berlin, he was co-editor of the antisemitic magazine Luch Sveta (Луч Света; "Ray of Light") which was published from April 1919 onward. Luch Sveta had republished the notorious antisemitic forgery, The Protocols of the Elders of Zion, and indirectly became one of the first outside forces along with Pyotr Shabelsky-Bork and Vinberg to influence the burgeoning ideology of Nazism in their support of violence against individuals deemed subhuman. Before the assassination attempt on Pavel Milyukov, he worked as a typewriter. For ideological reasons, he refused to take commissions from the Soviet Union.

In 1921, on a street in Berlin, Taboritsky accidentally met former-State Duma politician Alexander Guchkov. Taboritsky attacked him with an umbrella, for which he spent several days in a local prison.

==== Attempted assassination of Pavel Milyukov ====
Together with Shabelsky-Bork, Taboritsky participated in an assassination attempt against Pavel Milyukov. To accomplish it, they drove from Munich to Berlin, where Milyukov was giving a lecture. During the lecture, Taboritsky opened fire. When Vladimir Dmitrievich Nabokov rushed at Shabelsky-Bork, striking the arm with which Taboritsky was holding his gun, Taboritsky shot three times at point-blank range at Nabokov. Nabokov was immediately killed by a shot in the heart. After this, Taboritsky went to the wardrobe and, taking his clothes, went to the exit door, however a woman exclaimed: "Here is the killer!", and Taboritsky was detained by the crowd. In addition to Nabokov, who died on the spot, nine people were injured during the shooting, including the chairman of the Berlin group of the Kadet party, L. E. Elyashev, and one of the editors of the "Rul'" newspaper, Avgust Kaminka. A medical examination of Shabelsky-Bork and Taboritsky showed that both had long been using drugs, a strong dose of which was taken on the day of the assassination.

The trial of the assassination attempt against Milyukov took place on July 3–7, 1922, in the Berlin Criminal Court in Moabit. The court sentenced Taboritsky to 14 years in prison for complicity in the attempt and intentionally inflicting serious wounds on Nabokov that caused his death.

==== Imprisonment ====
Taboritsky and Bork were sent to Brandenburg prison where the prison director treated them extremely well. They had practically no restrictions on their correspondences, their cells were stocked with books, icons, and even a camera, and they even had regular examination by doctors. In 1924 Taboritsky was even temporarily released to Brandenburg City Hospital for treatment on "the word of honor of an imperial cavalry officer". They were released on April 22, 1927 under amnesty.

==== Post-release ====
Vinberg, died a few weeks before Taboritsky's release which meant he needed to find a new mentor which ended up being General Vasily Biskupsky.

After his release Taboritsky distanced himself from the political chaos in White émigré society, finding work as a shipping agent and deciding to marry. This last endeavor however, was hampered by the fact that Taboritsky was stateless and if he married a German citizen she would also lose her citizenship. To solve this issue he applied for German citizenship in May 1932 but was denied in November 1932 due to the fact he had not lived in Germany long enough, and that he had a criminal record.

=== Activities under the Nazi regime ===
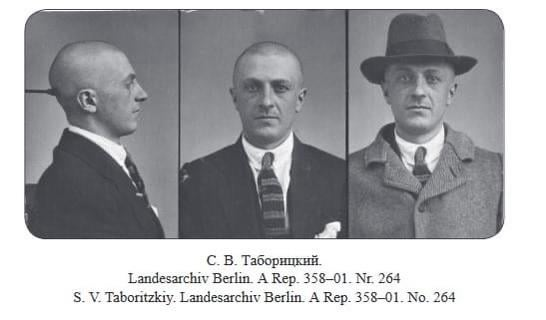
Three photos of Taboritsky taken within the Third Reich, c. 1943 (Landesarchiv Berlin)

After the Nazis took power Taboritsky saw this as his opportunity get citizenship and applied again in May 1933. To make his application more appealing to the Nazis he claimed he left the Russian military due to wanting to serve under "racially alien superiors", that he and his associated had fought against Jews and Freemasons, that the Weimar authorities had mistreated him to the point where he was not even allowed to work as a taxi driver, and that he had German ancestors and that he felt German. He hid the Jewish origin of his mother and attributed German roots to her, and he ascribed the Russian nobility to the fictitious father, "Vladimir Vasilievich Taboritsky". Pretending to be of noble origin, he used the German surname particle "von" (von Taboritzki). Though due to the fact that he not lived in Germany for 20 years this appeal was rejected.

On August 6, 1934 he made another attempt to gain citizenship, including writing directly to Joseph Goebbels. He claimed that he had introduced The Protocols of the Elders of Zion to Germany, that he had tried to assassinate the leader of "Jewish democracy", that during the trials he had declared allegiance to the ideas of Nazism, and that leftist Weimar officials had denied his citizenship in 1932 on account of his politics. But in early 1935 he was refused again. He joined the SA and applied again in summer 1935, with his application being supported by his unit commander. But after a year and a half of investigation by the Nazi state he was refused again. Though in early 1937 they had a drastic change of opinion and because of his Germanophilia and anti-communism he could become a citizen.

Since May 1936, Taboritsky had been the deputy of General Vasily Biskupsky for the Nazi-created Bureau for Russian Refugees in Germany (Vertrauensstelle für russische Flüchtlinge in Deutschland). Taboritsky's duties included maintaining a file cabinet of Russian emigration and political monitoring of its sentiments. Taboritsky's activities were carried out in close contact with the Gestapo. Gleb Rahr describes Taboritsky as: "Dry, lean, pointed, wizened, slightly weazened type, not flowering, but fading".

In April 1937, Taboritsky married Elisabeth von Knorre, a Nazi Party member since 1931 and granddaughter of the astronomer Karl Friedrich Knorre. After numerous petitions (including some invoking the name of Goebbels) and refusals, he received German citizenship in 1938 after a physical examination determined his "Nordic Physique" and joined the NSDAP in 1942, retroactively adopted from the date of application of 1940.

In 1939 he created the National Organization of Russian Youth (Russian: НОРМ, romanized: NORM). The organization was under the direct control of the SS. It was similar to the German Hitler Youth organization to which it was subordinate. During World War II Taboritsky recruited several hundred white émigrés to serve as translators in the Wehrmacht, first recruited from Germany and later from Vichy France. In 1944 the Gestapo began to crack down on NTS members in the summer of 1944, Taboritsky was reportedly vindictive and taunted the wife of an NTS member who had gone to Taboritsky for help. Though as the Soviets approached Danzig, Taboritsky prevented émigrés from being mobilized, and as the Soviets approached Berlin, Taboritsky helped hundreds or even thousands of Russian émigrés escape the city, including himself, in defiance of Adolf Hitler's orders.

=== Post-WWII ===
In the last days of the war, Taboritsky fled from Berlin, later living in Limburg an der Lahn within West Germany. He continued to occasionally publish in the Brazil-based monarchist journal Vladimirsky Vestnik. After the death of Shabelsky-Bork in 1952 he wrote an obituary for him. Taboritsky died on October 16, 1980 of natural causes, aged 83.

== See also ==
- Aufbau-Vereinigung
- Andrey Vlasov
- Bronislav Kaminski
