= Otto von Kursell =

German painter and caricaturist (1884–1967)

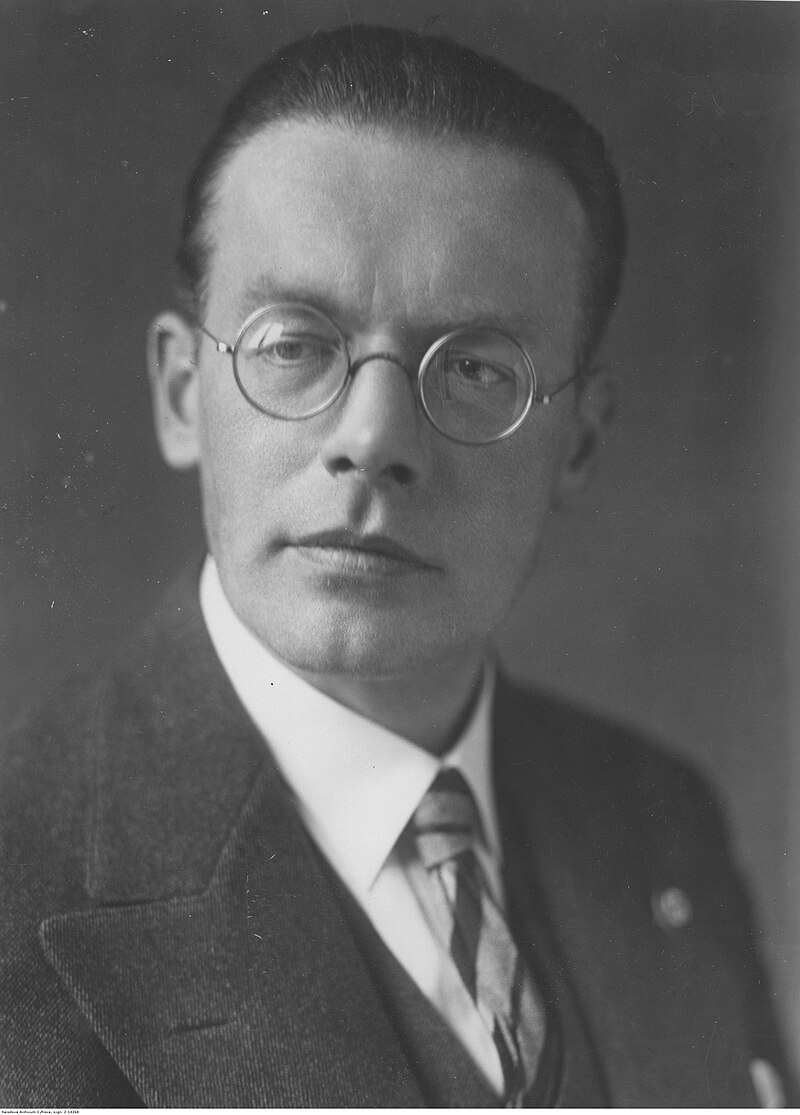
- Kursell in an undated photograph

Reichstag Deputy
- In office 10 April 1938 – 8 May 1945

Personal details
- Born: 28 November 1884 Saint Petersburg, Russian Empire
- Died: August 30, 1967 (aged 82) Munich, West Germany
- Party: Nazi Party
- Education: Academy of Fine Arts, Munich
- Profession: Painter, artist, professor
- Awards: Golden Party Badge; Blood Order

Military service
- Allegiance: Russian Empire
- Branch/service: Imperial Russian Army
- Years of service: 1916–1917
- Rank: Lieutenant
- Battles/wars: World War I

Otto Konstantin Gottlieb von Kursell (28 November 1884 – 30 August 1967) was a Baltic German painter and graphic artist, ministerial official, member of the Reichstag, director of the State Academy of Fine Arts in Berlin-Charlottenburg, and senator of the Prussian Academy of Arts. Having gained recognition as a master student of Franz von Stuck, Kursell quickly earned a reputation as a portrait painter. After World War I, he lent his talent to antisemitic and anti-communist movements. He published numerous political caricatures targeting Jews, Russians, and communists. He gave inflammatory speeches and actively participated in guard duties against members of the Spartacus League, as well as in field exercises and patrols.

Through Alfred Rosenberg, Kursell met Dietrich Eckart, who not only published his work but also recruited him to contribute to the magazine Auf gut deutsch. Kursell also provided antisemitic caricatures for Völkischer Beobachter, Phosphor, and Völkischer Kurier. In 1924, he published illustrations of the defendants in the Hitler trial. As one of the highly paid National Socialist artists, Kursell actively promoted Nazi propaganda in his works and teaching until the end of World War II. Interned by the Soviet occupation forces until 1950, he lived the rest of his life in seclusion and died in Munich.

== Family ==
Otto von Kursell came from the Baltic German noble family Kursell. He was born in Saint Petersburg, the son of excise officer Woldemar von Kursell (1849–1915) and Luise Stolzenburg (1857–1944). On August 12, 1908, in Reval (now Tallinn, Estonia), Kursell married Julia Wencelides (born July 1, 1887, in Saint Petersburg; died July 31, 1961, in Munich). She was the daughter of engineer and factory director Franz Wencelides and Luba Reuther.

== Early life and education ==
Kursell attended the Realschule in Reval and studied structural engineering at the Riga Polytechnic Institute from 1903 to 1905. During this time, he became a member of the politically active student fraternity Corps Rubonia. In 1905, he moved to Dresden, where he studied architecture at the Technical University of Dresden from 1905 to 1907. From 1907 to 1911, he attended the Academy of Fine Arts in Munich, quickly advancing from being a student of Hugo von Habermann to a master student of Franz von Stuck. He soon gained his first successes as a portrait painter.

In 1916 and 1917, Kursell fought as a lieutenant in the Russian infantry during World War I. In 1918, he worked in the press office of the Armeeoberkommando (Army High Command) VIII for the German occupiers in Riga, under Erwin von Scheubner-Richter. His colleagues in the press office included Arno Schickedanz and Max Hildebert Boehm.

At the end of 1918 or early 1919, Kursell traveled to Munich, which at the time had become a hub for many emigrated Baltic Germans. The future Nazi Party ideologue Alfred Rosenberg also arrived in Munich around this time, and Kursell, along with Ernst Friedrich Tode, became one of Rosenberg's first contacts in the city.

In 1919, Kursell co-founded and led the secret Baltic German association Der Verband der Ordensgründer along with Baron Friedrich von der Ropp, Roderich von Bistram, and Harald von Rautenfeld. This organization formally constituted itself on October 10, 1920, in Erkner, near Berlin, and operated under the codename "X." In 1929, it evolved into the Baltische Brüderschaft (Baltic Brotherhood), which later became the Brüderlicher Kreis (Brotherly Circle) after World War II.

== Nazi activist ==
In 1921, Kursell finally obtained German citizenship. That same year, he contributed to the pamphlet Totengräber Rußlands (Gravediggers of Russia), published by the German People's Publishing House, for which Rosenberg wrote the foreword. This popular pamphlet propagated the conspiracy theory of "Jewish Bolshevism" and contained 32 caricatures by Kursell, depicting high-ranking Bolshevik officials with "Jewish" facial features in a racist manner, each accompanied by four-line verses written by Dietrich Eckart.

In 1922, Kursell joined the Nazi Party (NSDAP). In 1922 and 1923, he was a member of the Munich Einwohnerwehr (a paramilitary citizens' militia) as a "Wehrmann" and joined a regiment of the Nazi Party paramilitary organization, the Sturmabteilung (SA), in Munich in 1923. As a member of the SA, Kursell also participated in Adolf Hitler's Beer Hall Putsch on November 9, 1923. After the NSDAP was temporarily banned following the failed coup, Kursell rejoined the party in 1932 with membership number 1,274,040. However, his reentry was backdated to May 1, 1925, and he was assigned the low membership number 93.

Following this, Kursell embarked upon an active career in service of Hitler and the party. From 1931 to 1935, he served as the managing director of the Kampfbund für deutsche Kultur (Militant League for German Culture) in Berlin and as the editor of Deutsche Kulturwacht. At the same time, he was also an editor for the party's newspaper, Völkischer Beobachter.

After Hitler's seizure of power in 1933, Kursell became a consultant in the visual arts department of the Prussian Ministry of Culture and was appointed as a professor at the Berlin University of the Arts in Berlin-Charlottenburg. He later became its director. Between 1933 and 1936, Kursell was a member of the presidial council in the Reich Chamber of Fine Arts, a component in Joseph Goebbels' Reich Chamber of Culture. In 1934, he was appointed a ministerial counselor and head in the department of fine arts in the Reich Ministry of Science, Education and Culture. From 1935 to 1936, he became the managing director of the Volksdeutsche Mittelstelle. On January 30, 1936, he was promoted to SS-Obersturmbannführer in the Schutzstaffel (SS) with number 161,337.

However, in 1937, he was forced to resign from the SS, SA, and the party because he was also a leading member of the Baltische Brüderschaft, which was forcibly dissolved. To avoid imminent arrest, Kursell initiated disciplinary proceedings against himself. Likely due to his past involvement in the 1923 Putsch alongside Hitler, he was reactivated as an SA member in September 1940. He became an SA-Standartenführer and was promoted to SA-Oberführer in November 1944. In 1942, he participated in the SA Art Exhibition in Dresden. In April 1938, he was elected to the Reichstag from electoral constituency 14 (Weser-Ems).

A portrait of Hitler painted by Kursell in 1940 was prominently featured in the April 1941 issue of the magazine Die Kunst im Deutschen Reich. In 1944, Kursell was included in the Gottbegnadeten-Liste compiled by the Reich Ministry of Public Enlightenment and Propaganda. His personal awards included the Golden Party Badge and the Blood Order.

== Postwar years and death ==
In 1945, Kursell was arrested by the Soviet occupying forces and was initially interned until 1950 in NKVD Special Camp No. 1 in Mühlberg and later in NKVD special camp Nr. 2 in Buchenwald. After returning from captivity in 1950, Kursell stated that he was economically and physically ruined. The Munich Appeals Chamber ruled on October 26, 1950, against further punishment for Kursell, considering it a mitigating factor that he had remained a member of the Protestant Church and had created portraits of Martin Luther. He spent the last years of his life in seclusion and is said to have declined an offer in 1952 to participate in the revival of the Baltic Brotherhood.
