= Schickedanz =

Schickedanz is a German surname. Notable people with the surname include:

- Albert Schickedanz (1846–1915), Austro-Hungarian architect
- Arno Schickedanz (1892–1945), German theorist and Nazi official
- Gustav Schickedanz (1895–1977), German entrepreneur
- Madeleine Schickedanz (born 1943), German entrepreneur

== See also ==
- Schickendantz
