= Pyotr Shabelsky-Bork =

Russian writer (1893–1952)

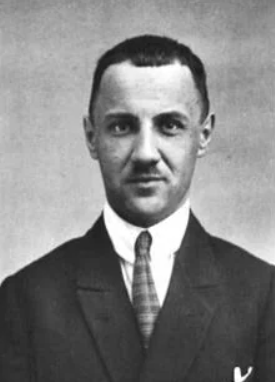
- Mugshot of Shabelsky-Bork after the attempted assassination of Pavel Milyukov
- Born: Pyotr Nikolaevich Popov; 5 May 1893; Kislovodsk, Kuban Oblast, Russian Empire
- Died: 18 August 1952 (aged 59); Buenos Aires, Argentina
- Military career
- Allegiance: Russian Empire
- Service years: 1914–1917
- Rank: Second lieutenant
- Known for: Attempted assassination of Pavel Milyukov
- Conflicts: World War I

Pyotr Nikolayevich Shabelsky-Bork (Russian: Пётр Николаевич Шабельский-Борк; 5 May 1893 – 18 August 1952) was a Russian officer and writer, active in far-right and antisemitic politics in early 20th-century Europe, best known for the attempted assassination of Pavel Milyukov and resulted killing of Vladimir Nabokov, father of the novelist of the same name, in Berlin on 28 March 1922. Shabelsky-Bork collaborated with the Nazi Party until the end of World War II, working thereafter on monarchist and Orthodox Christian publications in South America until his death in 1952.

== Biography ==
Pyotr Nikolaevich Popov was born on 5 May 1893, in Kislovodsk, Russian Empire, to a family of wealthy landowners. Popov's mother was a leading member of the Union of the Russian People, and was an editor of a Black Hundreds periodical published in Saint Petersburg. Popov studied at the University of Kharkov before joining the Imperial Russian Army during the outbreak of First World War in 1914, serving at the rank of second lieutenant in the Ingush Cavalry Regiment of the Caucasian Native Cavalry Division. After the February Revolution Popov retired from the military, but after the October Revolution in 1917 he was imprisoned by the Bolsheviks for being the member of a monarchist organization, and on 3 January 1918 the Petrograd Revolutionary Tribunal sentenced him to imprisonment and forced community service for a period of nine months. While in prison Popov met with far-right writer Fyodor Viktorovich Vinberg, which subsequently contributed to the emigration. On 1 May 1918, Popov and Vinberg were amnestied on the occasion of "international proletarian solidarity", and shortly after their release travelled to Kiev where they emigrated to Germany with German soldiers retreating from the city after it was captured by Ukrainian nationalist troops belonging to Symon Petliura.

== Germany ==
Popov adopted the pseudonym Pyotr Nikolayevich Shabelsky-Bork, originally for his literary works, which was derived from his godmother Elisaveta Aleksandrovna Shabelskaya-Bork. Soon after his arrival in Berlin, Shabelsky-Bork became closely associated with General Vasily Biskupsky and Sergey Taboritsky, who had also fled from Russia to Germany in the aftermath of World War I and became leading figures in the Wirtschaftliche Aufbau-Vereinigung, a German-Russian conspiratorial group. Biskupsky was a leading member of the part of the White Russian émigré community involved in German far-right politics, which Shabelsky-Bork eventually joined and became an important promoter of the notorious Protocols of Zion. Shabelsky-Bork also began working with Fyodor Viktorovich Vinberg, and the two collaborated in the production of a yearbook, Luch Sveta ("A Ray of Light"). In the third issue of this periodical (May 1920) the complete text of the 1911 edition of Sergei Nilus's book was published.

== Attempted assassination of Pavel Milyukov ==
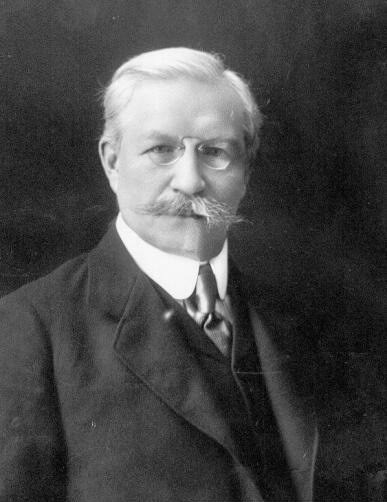
Pavel Milyukov in 1916

Shabelsky-Bork and Sergey Taboritsky were the two assassins responsible for the death of Vladimir Dmitrievich Nabokov during a failed assassination on 28 March 1922. The intended target, Pavel Milyukov, was a leading member of the Constitutional Democratic Party (commonly known as the Kadets), a Russian liberal centrist political party known for their strong support for full citizenship for all of Russia's minorities and Jewish emancipation. The party had been forced to leave the country after Bolshevik victory in the Russian Civil War, and was holding a political conference in absentia in Berlin. Nabokov attempted to stop the assassination, but was shot once by Taboritsky and died instantly.

Shabelsky-Bork and Taboritsky were Russian monarchists, and intended to kill Milyukov to "avenge the Russian monarchy" according to their own confession during criminal investigation. It is also worthy of note that they both were supporters of the Nazi Party and were against Milyukov's liberal beliefs generally.

Shabelsky-Bork had 2 revolvers, likely from his service in World War I and Taboritsky had purchased a revolver at an unknown date. They both had taken a large dose of an unknown psychoactive drug on the day of the shooting. Shabelsky-Bork and Taboritsky arrived at one of Milyukov's lectures at the stadium after driving from Munich to Berlin. They entered and sat in the third row, and eventually Shabelsky-Bork stood up and opened fire at Milyukov. Dr. Asnes, who was next to Milyukov, threw him to the ground in an effort to save him from the bullets. Shabelsky-Bork and Taboritsky then proceeded to jump onto the stage, continuing to fire at Milyukov. Russian criminologist, journalist and progressive statesman, Vladimir Dmitrievich Nabokov who was at the scene attacked Shabelsky-Bork, hitting him in the hand in an attempt to disarm him. Taboritsky then fired 3 rounds at point-blank range toward Nabokov with only 1 round hitting. The bullet pierced Nabokov's chest hitting him in the heart, killing him instantly. They then began indiscriminately firing into the crowd injuring 9 people. Taboritsky then calmly walked off, changed his outfit to disguise himself and tried to leave but he was seen by a woman who yelled "Here's the killer!" The crowd outnumbered them and they were detained under citizen's arrest. The police then arrived, arresting them both.

The trial took place on July 3–7, 1922 in Berlin Criminal Court in Moabit. Taboritsky claimed that he did not shoot and said that Shabelsky-Bork had killed Nabokov although it was determined by witnesses that Taboritsky had shot Nabokov. Taboritsky was sentenced to 14 years of hard labor for "intentionally causing Nabokov serious injuries that caused his death" and Shabelsky-Bork was sentenced to 12 years of hard labor for attempted murder. However, both men only served five years, being released in the spring of 1927.

== Collaboration with the Nazis ==
After his release, Shabelsky-Bork continued his work with far-right political movements in Germany, eventually becoming involved with Adolf Hitler and the Nazi Party (NSDAP), whom he hoped would restore the monarchy in Germany. When the NSDAP came to power in 1933, Shabelsky-Bork was involved in organizing pro-Nazi groups among the Russian population in Germany such as the ROND (Russian Popular Liberation Movement). At the same time, Shabelsky was living a very meager existence: Biskupsky made various attempts to secure a job for "the most minimal salary" for his protege, however these efforts were fruitless.

== Death ==
In the spring of 1945, in the closing days of World War II, Shabelsky-Bork fled from Germany after his Berlin home was destroyed during an air raid. Shabelsky-Bork moved to Buenos Aires, Argentina, and was involved in the production of monarchist and Orthodox Christian publications across South America until his death from tuberculosis on 18 August 1952. After his death Sergey Taboritsky would write an obituary for him in the Brazilian monarchist newspaper the Vladimirsky Vestnik.

== Bibliography ==
- Kotelnikov, Konstantin D. (2018). "Покушение в Берлине в 1922 г. на П. Н. Милюкова и убийство В. Д. Набокова: показания обвиняемого, монархиста П. Н. Шабельского" [Attempt upon the Life of P. N. Milyukov and Assassination of V. D. Nabokov in Berlin (1922): Testimony of the Accused Monarchist P. N. Schabelsky] (PDF). Herald of an Archivist (in Russian) (3): 867–881. doi:10.28995/2073-0101-2018-3-867-881.
