= Fyodor Vinberg =

Russian politician (1868–1927)

- Фёдор Викторович Винберг
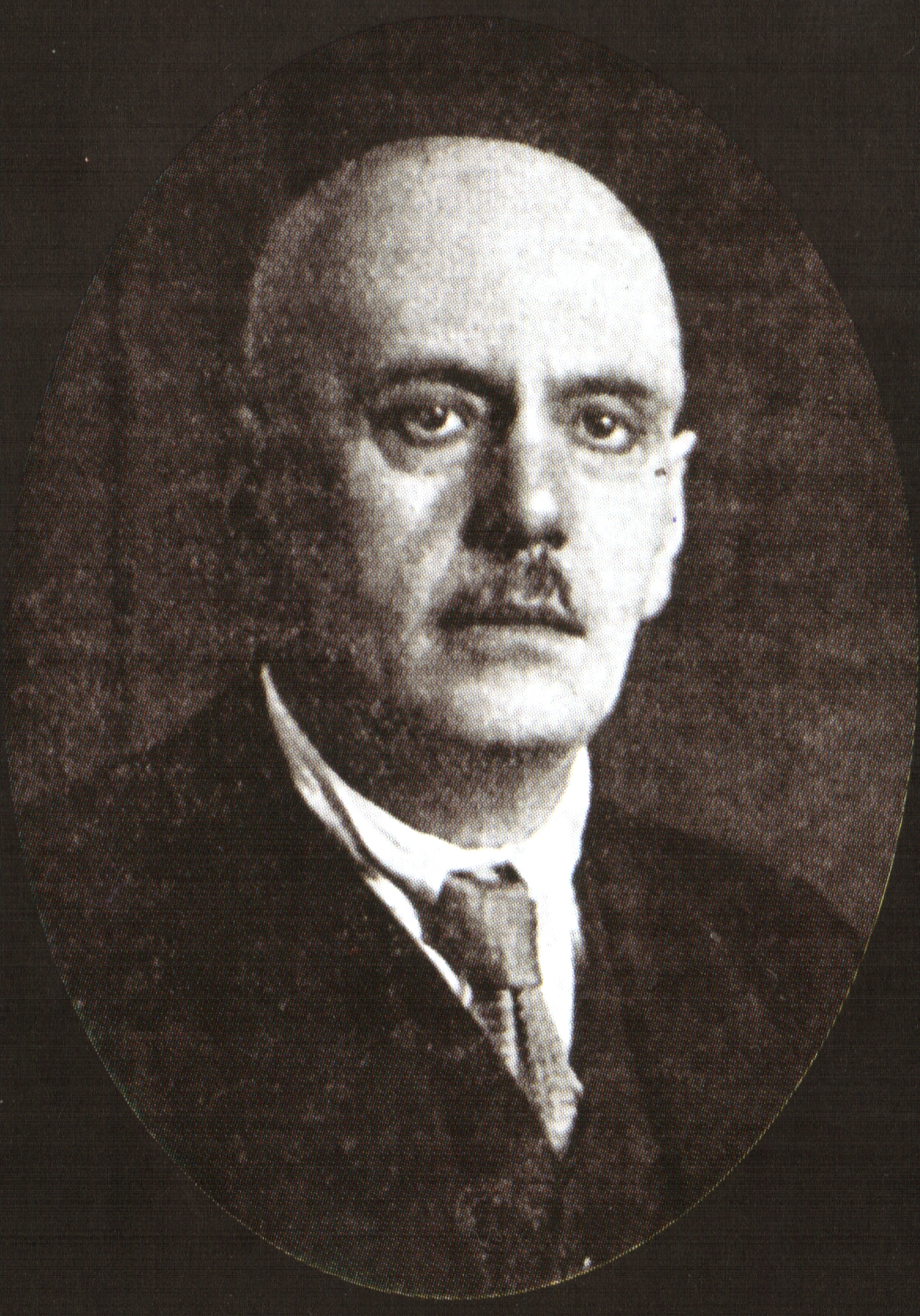
- Vinberg in the 1920s
- Born: 27 June [O.S. 15 June] 1868
- Died: February 14, 1927 (aged 58)
- Military career
- Allegiance: Russian Empire
- Branch: Imperial Russian Army
- Rank: Polkovnik

Fyodor Viktorovich Vinberg (Russian: Фёдор Викторович Винберг; 27 June [O.S. 15 June] 1868 – 14 February 1927) was a Russian right-wing military officer, publisher and journalist.

== Early life ==
Born in Kiev in the family of Wiktor Fjodorowitsch Vinberg, a general of the cavalry with German background, Vinberg studied in high school in Kiev and in the Alexander Lyceum. From 1891 to 1892, he worked in the Ministry of Internal Affairs.

In 1893, he embarked on an officer's career, and two years later, with the rank of cornet, he joined the Uhlan Life Guards Regiment of Tsarina Alexandra Feodorovna. During the Russian Revolution of 1905, he participated in punitive expeditions in the Baltic States. Serving in the cavalry, he rose to the rank of colonel in 1911.

In the years before World War I, he became involved in extreme right-wing politics, joining the Black-Hundredist Union of Archangel Michael and writing for right-wing publications.

During the war, he commanded the Second Baltic cavalry regiment. He became personally acquainted with the German Tsarina Aleksandra for whom he developed a strong emotional attachment. There were even rumours of an affair. After the February Revolution, he left the army.

== Revolutionary Russia ==
After the October Revolution, he was imprisoned by the Bolsheviks for his role in an alleged plot to overthrow the Provisional Government. He pleaded not guilty and pointed to the absurdity of such charges by the Bolsheviks, as they had overthrown the Provisional Government themselves. He was sentenced to one year's imprisonment by the revolutionary tribunal but was released in early 1918. There, he met fellow right-wingers, including Pyotr Shabelsky-Bork, who became his friend and collaborator. In prison, he kept notes, which he later published.

He made a dangerous journey to Kiev to fight with the White Army, where he was arrested and rescued by German forces and accompanied them in retreat to Germany. In 1919 he was in Berlin, where he published the short-lived right-wing newspapers/magazines Prizyv ("The Call") and Luch Sveta ("A Ray of Light"). Vinberg personally introduced the Protocols of the Elders of Zion from Russia to Germany, and via his magazines, republished and promoted the Protocols while advocating the destruction of the world's Jewry.

== Later life ==
In the wake of the Kapp Putsch of March 1920, Vinberg moved from Berlin to Munich. In 1921 he published in Russian a book, Krestny Put (The Way of the Cross"), translated into German as Via Dolorosa. There, in 1922, as a leading member of the conspiratorial Aufbau Vereinigung (Reconstruction Organisation) he had lengthy and detailed discussions with Adolf Hitler on ideological matters. Later that year, under suspicion for his involvement in the assassination of Russian émigré Vladimir Dmitrievich Nabokov, he moved to France, where he died in 1927.

== Beliefs ==
Vinberg was a loyal Russian monarchist with an aristocratic contempt for the masses. He was much influenced by the antisemitic speculations in Fyodor Dostoyevsky's A Writer's Diary. He called for "Aryan peoples" to unite against the "Jewish plan for world domination". For Russia, he advocated a return to the strong authority of the Tsar, which he hoped to restore, with German help. He also wanted Orthodoxy to unite with Catholicism and to learn from its methods in waging ideological war against the enemy, by anathematising the Freemasonry and all of Satan's servants "at Easter Week in all the churches and all the cathedrals of our homeland". Burbank comments that it would be "in other words a nationwide pogrom".

Walter Laqueur describes his ideas as "a half-way house between the old Black Hundred and National Socialism" and claims that Vinberg distinguished two kinds of antisemitism: the "higher", concerned with restrictive laws against the Jews, and the "lower", the brutal and homicidal behaviour of the lower classes, which was terrible but essential if the Jewish menace, recently responsible for communist revolution, is finally to be laid to rest.

David Redles mentions Vinberg's belief that the German and Russian peoples have to unite to defeat the Jews, which would result in world peace.

Norman Cohn says that "in all his writings Vinberg insists that one way or another the Jews must be got rid of". Although as a political programme his ideas could not be taken seriously, he correctly foresaw the propaganda success of the Protocols of Zion in Germany.

According to Kellogg, neither Vinberg nor his Aufbau colleagues publicly proposed "exterminating Jews along the lines of the National Socialist policy that became known as the Final Solution". Nevertheless, his apocalyptic language was so extreme that Laqueur concluded, "Vinberg is quite emphatic about this, the only solution is total physical extermination." Richard Pipes writes that "it was Vinberg and his friends who first called publicly for the physical extermination of the Jews", giving Laqueur as a reference.

Notwithstanding Laqueur's conviction that his upper class ideas would have been of little interest or value to Hitler, Vinberg appears to have been responsible for Hitler's conversion to the idea of worldwide Jewish-Bolshevist conspiracy. Also many of Alfred Rosenberg's own ideas were said to have been lifted straight from the writings of his friend Vinberg. Although his influence on Nazi thought declined following the failure of the Beer Hall Putsch in 1923, when anti-Slav sentiment gained ascendancy in Nazi policy, Kellogg argues that the influence revived with the invasion of the Soviet Union in 1941 and that he bears some responsibility for the horrors that occurred.

== Bibliography ==
- Ahad Ha'am.

Taĭnyĭ vozhdʹ īudeĭskīĭ.: Perevod s frantsuzskago
[of Miss L. Fry by Th. Vinberg, being an attempt to prove
the "Protokoly Sīonskikh Mudret︠s︡ov"
published in a work by S. A. Nilus
to be a work by U. Ginzberg].
by Leslie Fry; Thedor Viktorovich Vinberg Berlin, 1922.
OCLC: 84780936

- Krestny Put (Via Dolorosa)- 1921

== Bibliography ==
- The Russian Roots of Nazism by Michael Kellogg (Cambridge, 2005)
- L'Apocalypse de notre temps; les dessous de la propagande allemande d'après des documents inédits by Henri Rollin (Paris: Gallimard, 1939) pp. 153 seq.
- Russia and Germany, a Century of Conflict by Walter Laqueur (Boston: Little, Brown and Company, 1965) pp. 109 seq.
- Warrant for Genocide by Norman Cohn (London: Eyre & Spottiswoode, 1967) pp. 90, 139-140, 155-156, 184.
- Intelligentsia and revolution: Russian views of Bolshevism 1917-1922 by Jane Burbank. (New York; Oxford: Oxford University Press, 1986).
- Russia under the Bolshevik Regime 1919-1924 by Richard Pipes London: Harvill, 1994.
