= Schickendantz =

Schickendantz is a German surname. Notable people with the surname include:

- Friedrich Schickendantz (1837–1896), German-Argentine scientist
- Guillermo Schickendantz (born 1979), Argentine field hockey player

== See also ==
- Schickedanz
