= The Art of the German Empire =

Art magazine in Nazi Germany

The Art of the German Empire Die Kunst im Deutschen Reich
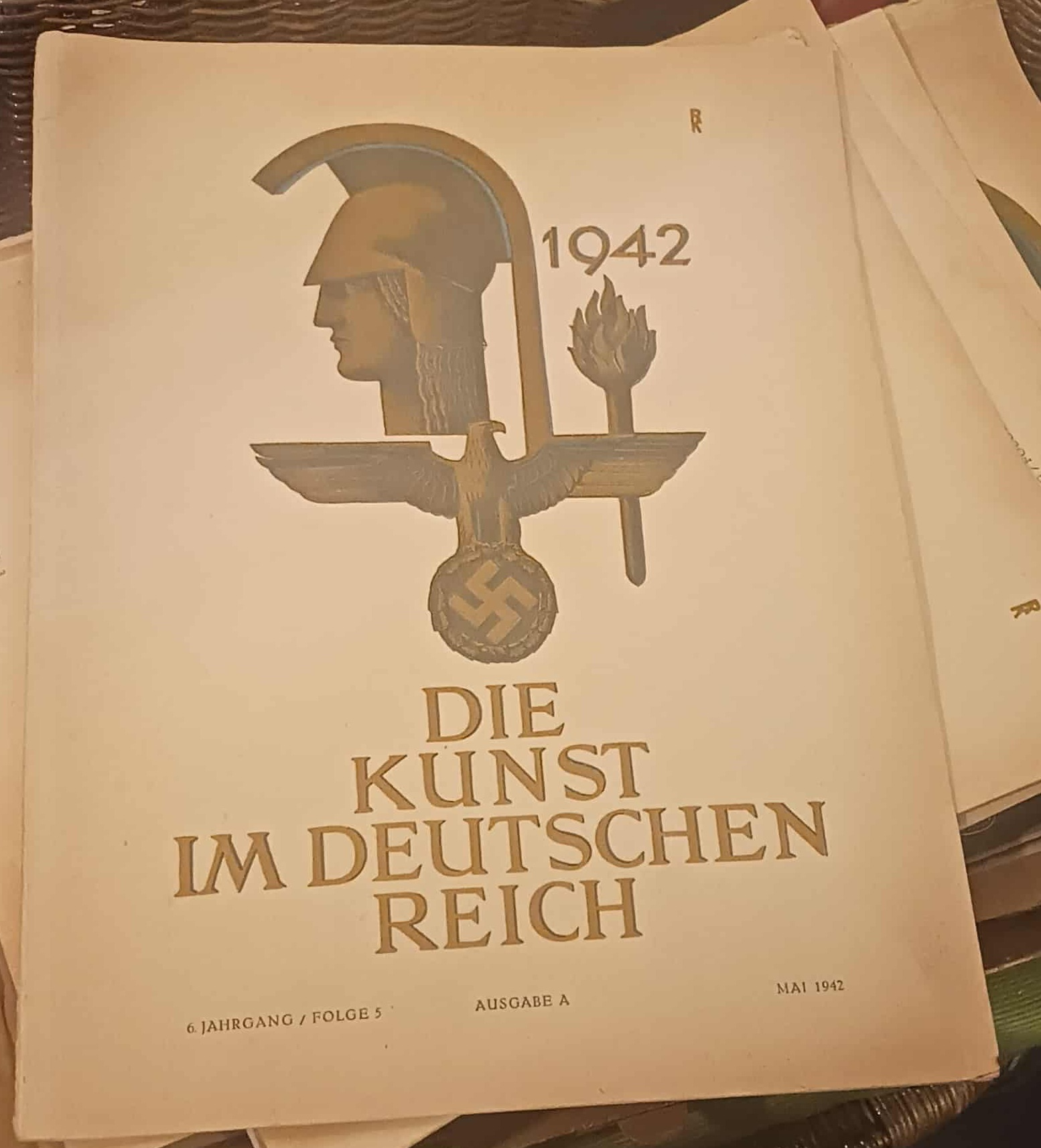
- Cover of May 1942 issue
- Editor: Alfred Rosenberg; Richard Klein; Albert Speer
- Categories: Art in Nazi Germany
- Frequency: monthly
- Founded: January 1937
- First issue: January 1937
- Final issue: July 1944
- Company: Amt Rosenberg
- Country: Nazi Germany
- Based in: Berlin
- Language: German

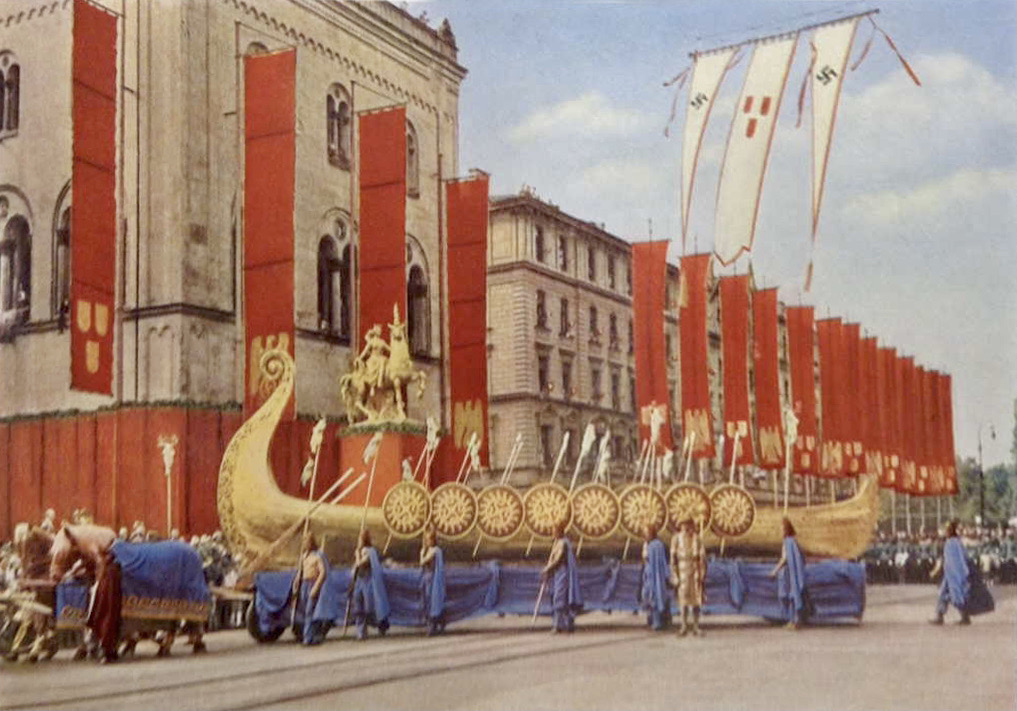
Image from July 1937 issue

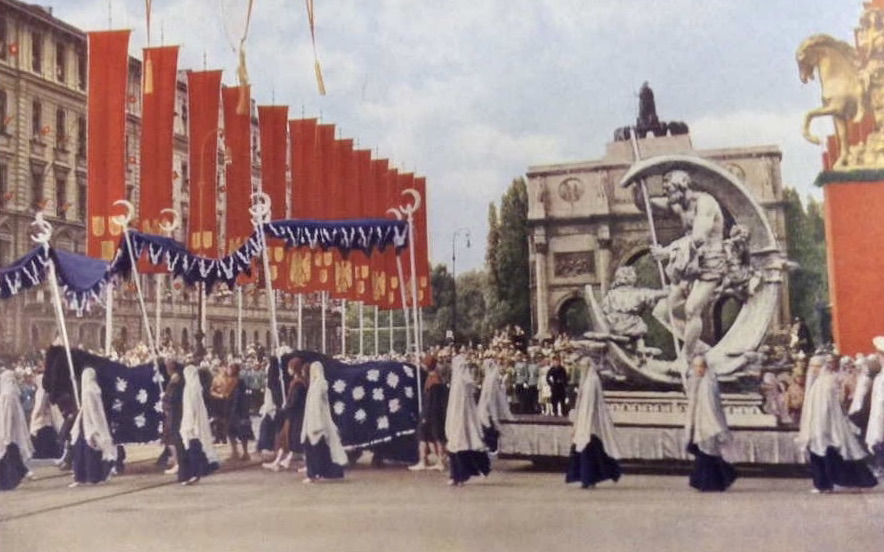
Image from March 1938 issue

The Art of the German Empire (German: Die Kunst im Deutschen Reich; before September 1939 titled The Art of the Third Reich, German: Die Kunst im Dritten Reich) was a state-published art magazine in Nazi Germany, and the country's biggest art publication. It began publication in January 1937 and was published monthly until September 1944; occasionally in double issues.

The magazine was very strict and selective in what it featured, and extremely few of its arist were women. Exhibits at the Great German Art Exhibition amounted for approximately one third of the magazine's illustrations. In 1939, its circulation was 50,000 copies.
