= Arno Schickedanz =

German diplomat (1892–1945)

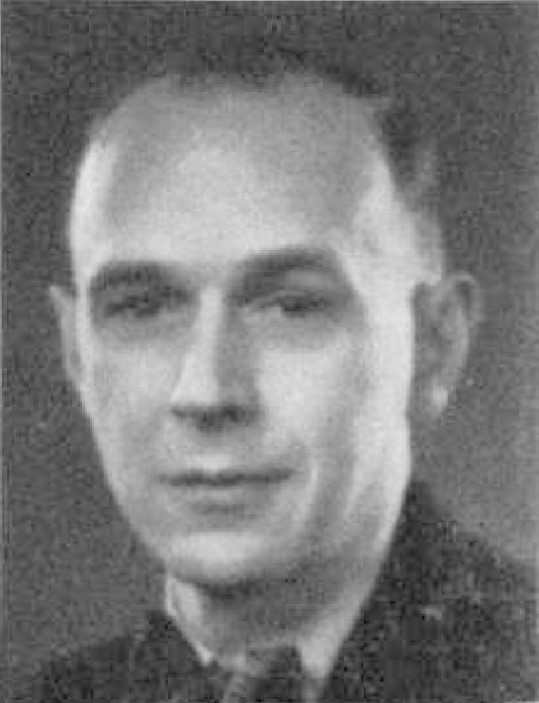
Arno Schickedanz in 1938

Arno Schickedanz (27 December 1892 – 12 April 1945) was a German diplomat who held paramount positions in both the NSDAP Office of Foreign Affairs (APA) and the Reich Ministry for the Occupied Eastern Territories (RMfdbO) of Nazi Germany. Both ministries he held positions in were under the command of Alfred Rosenberg, a friend since childhood and a leading Nazi theorist and ideologue. Schickedanz was a vehement antisemite, and his positions within Rosenberg's ministries often involved antisemitic programming. In particular, Schickedanz was a central figure in the expansion of the Foreign Policy Office. He was the proposed ruler of the Reichskommissariat Kaukasien; however, this territorial entity never came into existence. Schickedanz died of suicide on 12 April 1945.

== Early life ==
Schickedanz met Alfred Rosenberg, who grew up in the Estonian city of Reval, in his Latvian hometown of Riga, where Rosenberg had been studying at the Polytechnic Institute since 1910. Both cities were part of Russia at the time. In literature, Schickedanz is referred to, among other things, as a "school friend" and "Corps brother" of Rosenberg. The mention of school friend refers to their shared studies at the Polytechnic Institute in Riga, and Corps brother refers to the Corps Rubonia, founded in 1875, where Rosenberg and Schickedanz became members on the same day, March 2, 1911. Due to this early bond, Schickedanz remained one of the few close friends of Rosenberg addressed informally. The connection to Rosenberg had a formative character and decisively influenced his entire life thereafter.

According to the Rubonorum album, he continued his studies in Moscow from the summer of 1915 onwards with Rosenberg, and in January 1918, he graduated there with a degree in chemistry. Consequently, he gained personal experience with the rule of the Bolsheviks. In the autumn of 1918, he volunteered for a German cavalry regiment and thus participated as a soldier of the German Army in the First World War. Before the end of the war in 1918, Schickedanz worked together with Erwin von Scheubner-Richter, Otto von Kursell, and Max Hildebert Boehm for the German occupiers in the "Press Office Ober Ost VIII" in Riga. Otto von Kursell, with whom Schickedanz had worked until then, was one of the first people Rosenberg visited after his move to Munich at the end of 1918. In 1919, he was a member of the Baltic Landwehr, which recaptured Riga, occupied by the Bolsheviks, in May 1919.

== Weimar Republic ==
=== Political writer ===
During the early twenties, Schickedanz was an employee in the Economic Reconstruction Association initiated by Max von Scheubner-Richter, where he, along with von Scheubner-Richter and Biskupski, handled the daily business affairs. Simultaneously, Schickedanz served as the deputy director and personal secretary of Biskupski, the organization's vice president. Together, Schickedanz and Biskupski arranged with the Russian claimant to the throne, Grand Duke Cyril Vladimirovich Romanov, for General Ludendorff to utilize funds totaling 500,000 gold marks to promote the joint national German-Russian cause.

Schickedanz supported von Scheubner-Richter in publishing the weekly magazine "Economic Policy Correspondence on Eastern Questions and Their Significance for Germany." From 1923 to 1933, Schickedanz was the head of the Berlin office of the antisemitic daily newspaper Völkischer Beobachter. Due to his participation in the Beer Hall Putsch, Schickedanz later counted among the "Old Fighters" and received the so-called "Blood Order."

In 1927, Schickedanz published the radically antisemitic text The Judaism – A Counter-Race, which appeared gnostic and apocalyptic. In 1928, he followed it with the content-related text Social Parasitism in the Life of Nations, in which he portrayed Jews as a "race" of parasites and pests. Rosenberg explicitly referred to this latter publication and adopted the concept and idea of a parasitic "counter-race" in his 1930 work The Myth of the 20th Century.

The resentment that Joseph Goebbels had developed against Rosenberg at that time also affected Rosenberg's representatives. On February 16, 1930, Goebbels noted about Schickedanz: "He asked if I had something against him. I gave him an honest answer. He is probably decent personally. But he has nothing to eat. And a Baltic!" Goebbels' attitude did not change the fact that Schickedanz was able to establish a fairly close relationship with Adolf Hitler during those years of the Weimar Republic.

=== Foreign policy orientation ===
On September 14, 1930, Rosenberg was elected to the Reichstag as an NSDAP representative for the electoral district of Hesse-Darmstadt, where he served on the Foreign Affairs Committee. In the spring of 1932, Rosenberg unsuccessfully pressured Schickedanz to move his residence to Berlin to secure a spot on the candidate list for the Reichstag elections. It is suspected that Schickedanz's lack of presence in Berlin at that time may have led to the rejection of this proposal. Schickedanz did not become a member of the Reichstag until 1936, three years after the National Socialist "seizure of power." However, during those days, Schickedanz was actively involved in supporting Rosenberg's foreign policy interests. In 1931, Schickedanz established the connection for Rosenberg with the Baltic-British journalist and Baron Wilhelm de Ropp and his former war acquaintance Major Frederick William Winterbotham. Wilhelm de Ropp, who had been dispossessed by the Soviets and was a correspondent for the newspaper The Times as well as a foreign representative of the Bristol Aeroplane Company, later became a significant confidant of Rosenberg in London.

== National Socialism ==
=== Chief of Staff in the Foreign Policy Office ===
After Rosenberg was appointed head of the NSDAP Foreign Policy Office (APA) on April 1, 1933, Schickedanz received the high position of Chief of Staff in this authority. Schickedanz held this position until the dissolution of the APA in the spring of 1943. During the APA's formative phase, Schickedanz was Rosenberg's most important man, even more so than Thilo von Trotha. Schickedanz managed two of the six main offices, namely the Personnel Office and Main Department V "Eastern Problem." Ernst Piper wrote in 2005: "This meant he was responsible for personnel policy, which gave him central influence over the course of events, and for the eastern area, which was initially of minor importance for the APA's work but, in the long term, of decisive perspective for racist expansionism." Until the fall of 1933, Schickedanz also headed the highly significant Eastern Europe Department for APA policy. Afterward, the leadership of this department, which formed its own main department, was taken over by Georg Leibbrandt.

On December 26, 1934, Rosenberg expressed his interest in a connection with King Carol II of Romania, intending to use Schickedanz to establish this connection. Rosenberg wrote in his diary that day: "Christmas is coming, I must send Lecca back to Bucharest with some comforting words after almost three weeks. Hopefully, in January, we can resume the broken threads. The bond of Romania to Germany is really worth all the effort. Schickedanz should speak to the King privately to prepare a friendship treaty; with 'our' embassy, anything is possible."

In addition to his duties at the APA, at the March 1936 parliamentary election, Schickedanz was elected as a deputy to the Reichstag from electoral constituency 17, Westphalia North. He was reelected in April 1938 from constituency 34, Hamburg and retained this seat until his death.

On June 15, 1939, Schickedanz, in his position as head of the Eastern Office in the APA, sent a report on Eastern European questions to the head of the Reich Chancellery, Hans Heinrich Lammers. Against the background of the APA's Germanization ideology, he opposed the Hitler-Stalin Pact because it would limit the "German living space" expansion opportunities. Here, as later in the Ministry for the Occupied Eastern Territories, the argument was always made on the same line. The report stated, particularly with regard to Ukrainians and Belarusians, that for the future organization of the eastern area, "the political-psychological handling of the population of these areas is necessary, on the one hand to relieve purely military actions, on the other hand for possible further use of individual nationalities in German interests." Schickedanz first formulated the idea here that Germany should ally with the non-Russian peoples inside and outside the Soviet Union against Russia. In the same year, Schickedanz applied for the foreign policy department of the Reich Chancellery, but his application was rejected. On August 25, 1939, Rosenberg noted in his diary: "I feel as if this Moscow Pact will eventually avenge itself on National Socialism... How can we still speak of saving and shaping Europe if we must ask the destroyer of Europe for help?"

By September 1939, the APA's connection to London had loosened. Rosenberg wrote on September 24, 1939: "Yesterday, the card of the British adviser in the English aviation ministry arrived from Montreux. He asks Schickedanz to come. He kept his word, a thin thread to London still holds. Tomorrow inform the Führer and Göring. I am curious what the gentlemen from London expect from us as a possible basis for peace."

In April 1940, Rosenberg succeeded in getting Schickedanz as the APA's liaison man in the Reich Chancellery. On April 13, 1940, he wrote in his diary: "Since the Reich Commissariat Norway is attached to the Reich Chancellery, Schickedanz had discussions with Lammers, who appointed him as the Reich Chancellery's representative. Now all correspondence with Norway (including the Foreign Office) goes through his hands."

=== Chief of Staff in Occupied Norway ===
From 1943 to 1944, Arno Schickedanz served as Chief of Staff to Josef Terboven, the Reich Commissioner for the Occupied Eastern Territories of Norway.

In late April 1945, Schickedanz took his own life to evade responsibility. According to Rosenberg, who described him as a "youth comrade" and "friend," Schickedanz shot his wife, his eight-year-old daughter, and himself in Berlin.
