= Vladimir Dmitrievich Nabokov =

Russian criminologist and politician (1877–1922)

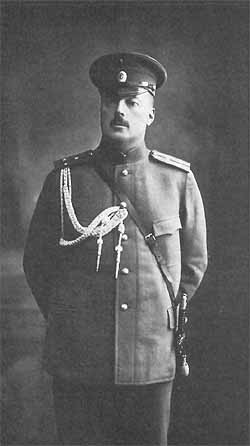
Nabokov in his World War I officer uniform, 1914

Vladimir Dmitrievich Nabokov (Russian: Влади́мир Дми́триевич Набо́ков; 21 July [O.S. 9 July] 1870 – 28 March 1922) was a Russian criminologist, journalist, and progressive statesman during the last years of the Russian Empire. He was the father of Russian-American author Vladimir Nabokov.

== Early life ==
Nabokov was born in Tsarskoe Selo, into a wealthy and aristocratic family. His father Dmitri Nikolaevich Nabokov (1827–1904) was a Justice Minister in the reign of Alexander II from 1878 to 1885, and his mother Maria von Korff (1842–1926) was a Baroness from a prominent Baltic German family in Courland.

He studied criminal law at the University of St. Petersburg and taught criminology at the Imperial School of Jurisprudence.

Nabokov married Elena Ivanovna Rukavishnikova in 1897 with whom he had five children. Their eldest son was the writer and lepidopterist Vladimir Vladimirovich Nabokov, who portrayed his father in his memoirs (Speak, Memory, 1967) and included in his novel Pale Fire a scene of misdirected assassination evoking the death of his father. Other children were Sergey (1900–1945), Kirill (1911–1964), Elena (1906–2000) and Olga (1903–1978), who was a childhood friend of Russian-American novelist Ayn Rand. His son Sergey was gay and was sent to Neuengamme labour camp, where he died on the 9 January 1945 due to a combination of dysentery, starvation and exhaustion.

== Career ==
From 1904 until 1917 he was the editor of the liberal newspaper Rech ("The Speech").

A prominent member of the Constitutional Democratic Party (CD, the "Kadets"), Nabokov was elected to Russia's parliament, the First Duma. He was regarded as the most outspoken defender of Jewish rights in the Russian Empire, continuing in a family tradition that had been led by his own father, Dmitry Nabokov, who as Justice Minister under Tsar Alexander II successfully opposed anti-semitic measures being passed in the government. He was also a passionate opponent of the death penalty. He was identified with the party's "center" and in favor of working with left-wing parties during the First State Duma and again during Russia's second revolutionary period.

In 1917, after the February Revolution, Nabokov helped draft the document for Grand Duke Michael's refusal of the throne. Nabokov was made secretary to the Provisional Government; however, he was forced to leave St. Petersburg in December 1917 after the Provisional Government was overthrown by the Bolshevik revolution. In 1918 he served as minister of justice in the Crimean Regional Government, where he and his family had taken refuge. In 1919 the Nabokovs fled to England and later settled in Berlin.

From 1920 until his death, Nabokov was the editor of the Russian émigré newspaper Rul‘ ("The Rudder"), which continued to advocate a pro-Western democratic government in Russia.

== Death ==
Nabokov attended a CD political conference in Berlin on 28 March 1922. During the proceedings, Pyotr Shabelsky-Bork and Sergey Taboritsky approached the stage singing the Tsarist national anthem and then opened fire on liberal politician and publisher Pavel Milyukov. In response, Nabokov jumped off the stage and wrestled Shabelsky-Bork down to the floor. Taboritsky then shot Nabokov three times at point-blank range, killing him instantly. The assailants failed even to wound their intended target Milyukov.

The assassins were subsequently convicted of the murder and sentenced to a 14-year prison term, but served only a fraction. Both of the assassins were affiliated with the far-right Aufbau-Vereinigung, and Shabelsky-Bork befriended Alfred Rosenberg after his release.

Nabokov is buried at the Berlin-Tegel Russian Orthodox Cemetery.

== Personal life ==
Nabokov was an active member of the irregular freemasonic lodge, the Grand Orient of Russia’s Peoples.

== Sources ==
- Brian Boyd: Vladimir Nabokov: The Russian Years
- Vladimir Nabokov: Speak, Memory - especially Chapter 9
